= FILAT =

Airborne targeting pod

The FILAT (Forward-Looking Infrared and Laser Attack Targeting) pod is an airborne targeting pod designed to provide aircraft with all weather/night attack capabilities. It was first revealed to the public at 1998 Zhuhai Air Show, and it is designed by the 613 Institute of AVIC.

== FILAT ==
FILAT pod is the Chinese equivalent of the AN/AAQ-14 targeting pod of the LANTIRN system, and several derivatives have already been developed since its public debut. The Chinese government has acknowledged that FILAT pod is based on the experience of the following three western targeting pods: LANTIRN, TIALD and LITENING targeting pods. Although the Chinese government has not mentioned how LANTIRN and TIALD systems had fallen into the Chinese hands, western sources have reported that China had obtained the systems from downed allied aircraft via Iraq during the Gulf War. The structure of FILAT pod is similar to most targeting pods, consisting of: laser designator, FLIR, and charge-coupled device. Just like the AN/AAQ-20 Sharpshooter targeting pod, a simplified AN/AAQ-14 developed as a cheaper alternative, a similar cheaper alternative for FILAT has also been developed, but the designation is unknown and despite active marketing efforts, no sales have been reported. Some domestic Chinese sources have claimed that it is possible that this simplified version was developed as a backup should the more ambitious and technically challenging FILAT had failed, but such claims have yet to be verified. Features of the 1st generation FILAT pod include:

- Built–in-test (BITE) function.
- Open architecture software programming.
- Modular design of the hardware.
- Compatibility with MIL-STD-1553B standard.
- Option to upgrade to MIL-STD-1773 standard compatibility.

On September 21, 2005, the 613 Institute of AVIC debuted the 2nd generation FILAT pod, that has already been in Chinese service, during the Beijing International Air Show. The 2nd generation FILAT utilizes a new staring array and increased its air-to-air capability. However, the developer admitted that both the mean time between failures rate and the operational lifespan is much lower than the 10,000 hours of the Sniper Advanced Targeting Pod, though the actual numbers were not given. At the 6th Zhuhai Airshow in 2006, the 3rd generation of FILAT was debuted. For security reasons, very little information was released except that newer microelectronics have been used to improve reliability and other performance parameters.

== K/PZS-01 ==
K/PZS-01 (K/PZS01) laser targeting pod is a simplified version of FILAT by only keeping the laser ranger/designator. Designed for light attack aircraft, K/PZS-01 is the standard equipment for Nanchang Q-5 in Chinese service.

== K/JDC-01 ==
K/JDC-01 (K/JDC-01) is the development of FILAT, and it's deployed on Xian JH-7. The primary improvement of K/JDC-01 over the original FILAT is reported to be in the laser guidance: the original FILAT is bang-bang control system like that of Paveway II, while the laser guidance of K/JDC-01 is the more sophisticated seeker with a wider field of view and proportional guidance like Paveway III. Such claim has yet to be verified by other sources, and it's not known if K/JDC-01 is the 2nd or 3rd generation FILAT since no such information has yet been released by the 613th Institute, the developer of both.

== WMD-7 ==
WMD-7 pod on display.

Due to Chinese technological/industrial capability bottlenecks in the 1990s, the infrared (IR) sensor of the first generation FILAT had relatively low performance such as the time of operation. As a backup, a starlight night vision system was incorporated in FILAT for night targeting in nights with starlight or moonlight. By the time of 9th Zhuhai Airshow held in November 2012, Chinese technology has advanced enough that the performance of IR sensor is approaching that of west, and the starlight night vision backup is no longer needed. As a result, WMD-7 targeting pod only has IR, TV and laser systems. The laser targeting system of WMD-7 works at wavelength of 1.064 micrometer, with targeting range in excess of 13 km, and ranging range of 0.5 to 18 km. The pod weighs 280 kg. WMD-7 can be deployed on many aircraft, including CAC/PAC JF-17 Thunder.

== Loong Eye I ==
Loong Eye is the English name given to a Chinese targeting pod derived from FILAT, developed mainly for Unmanned aerial vehicles (UAVs) and some light helicopters. The exact Chinese name is actually Long zhi Yan, (龙之眼), meaning Dragon's Eye, but the developer give its English name as Loong Eye instead. The height of the system is less a meter, and can be easily installed on both airborne and surface platforms such as vehicles and boats. Loong Eye is a family of targeting pods, and the first member, designated as Loong Eye I, made its public debut in the 9th Zhuhai Airshow held in November 2012.

== Loong Eye II ==
Loong Eye II is the second member of Loong Eye family to make its public debut at the 9th Zhuhai Airshow held in November 2012. The weight of the total system of Loong Eye II is less than 20 kilograms, and Loong Eye II is specifically developed for UAVs.
