= ATLIS II =

French targeting pod for military aircraft

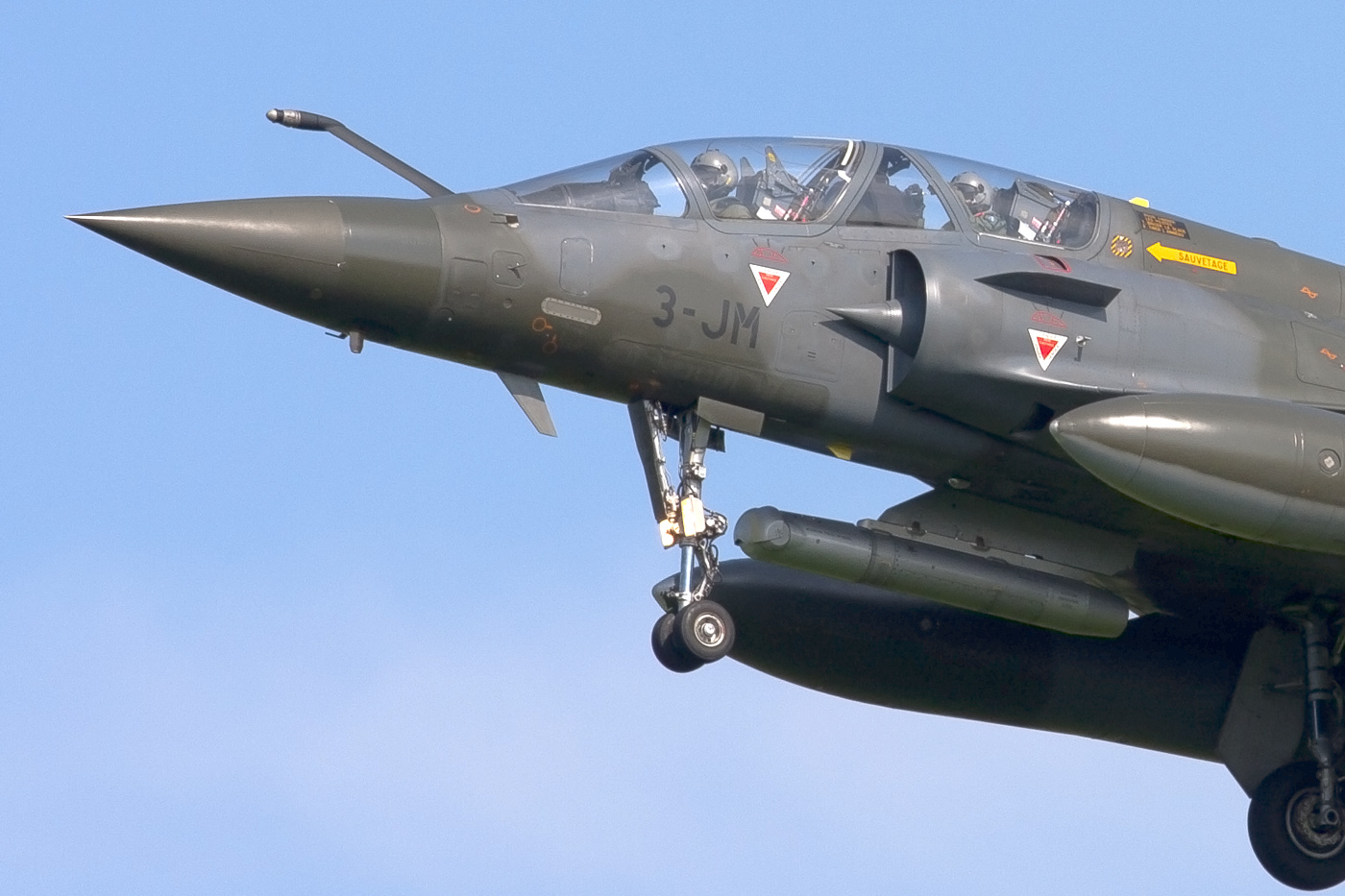
ATLIS II targeting pod

The Thomson-CSF ATLIS II (Automatic Tracking and Laser Integration System) is a French laser/electro-optical targeting pod for fighter bomber and attack aircraft.

ATLIS was developed starting in 1976, entering service in 1980. It was developed for the French Armée de l'Air, initially carried by SEPECAT Jaguar and Mirage 2000 aircraft.

ATLIS incorporates a laser designator boresighted with a television camera. The pilot or weapon systems officer uses the crosshairs to mark a target, which can then be attacked with laser-guided bombs or other guided weapons from the designating aircraft or other, friendly forces. Because it is designed for use by single-seat aircraft, it has a novel automatic lock-on feature, which keeps the laser focused on the target without further operator intervention (using an inertial guidance system, it can generally keep the laser on target even if the beam is temporarily interrupted by clouds).

ATLIS II is used by the SEPECAT Jaguar, Mirage F1, Mirage 2000, Mirage 2000N, and some Pakistani F-16s. It is compatible with various U.S. and French laser-guided bombs, with the French Aerospatiale AS-30L missile, and even with some Russian bombs and guided weapons.

In 1985, Pakistan Air Force selected ATLIS-II for its F-16 aircraft, making it the first non-European operator of this system. ATLIS-II pod is carried on the 5L intake station on the F-16. Over the years precision targeting using ATLIS has been a distinct phenomenon over-viewed regularly in PAF’ s operational exercises. In the recent PAF operations in Global War on Terrorism, ATLIS-II was extensively used for precision targeting.

The pod is limited in being primarily a daylight/clear-weather system. It was briefly replaced by the more capable Thomson-CSF PDLCT ("Pod de Designation Laser a Camera Thermique" / Laser Designation Pod with Infrared Camera") and then the Thales Damocles, which has a FLIR.

== See also ==
- Thomson-CSF
