= LANTIRN =

US Air Force navigation and targeting system

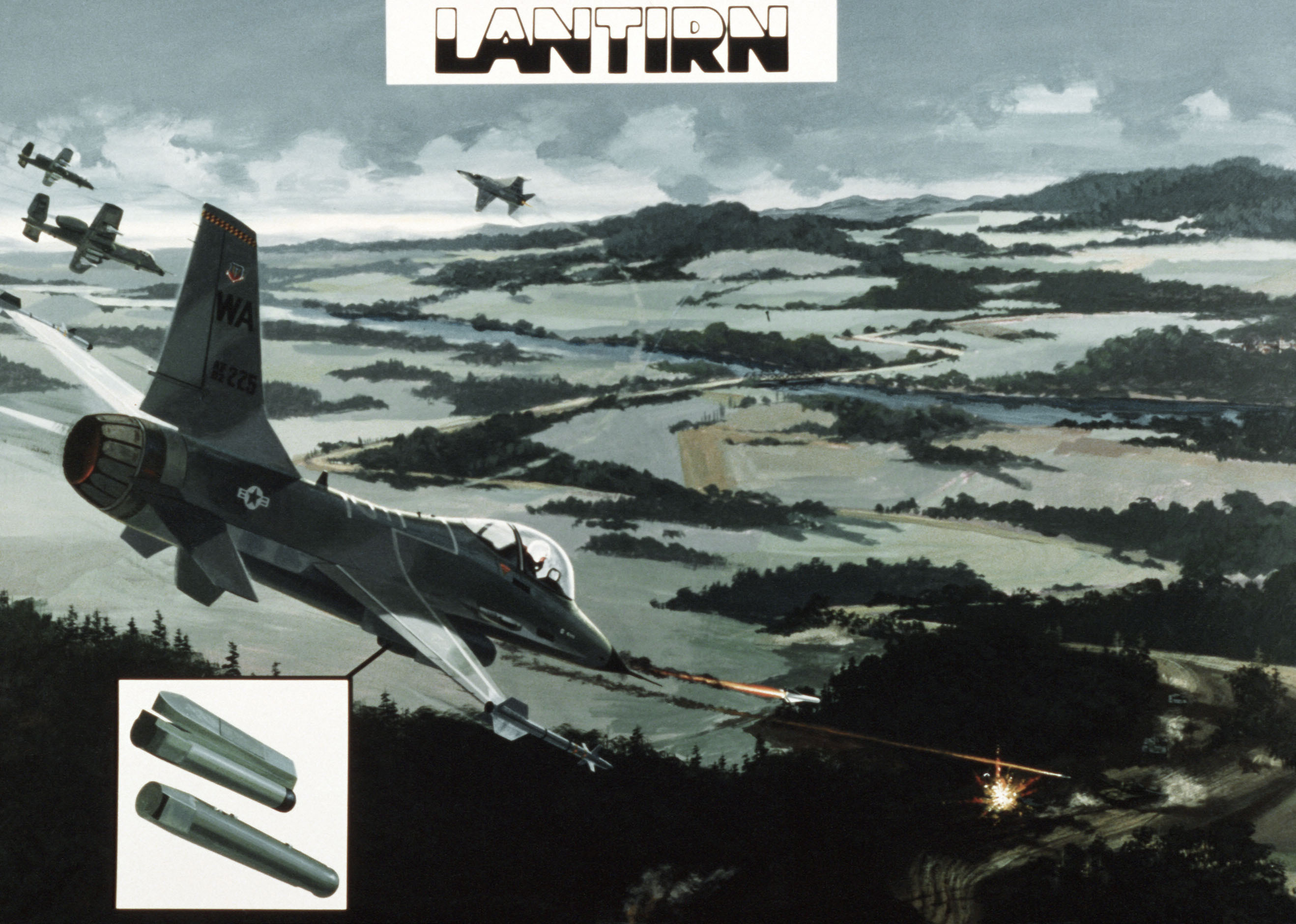
Artist's concept of a Low Altitude Navigation Targeting Infrared for Night (LANTIRN) scenario for attacking an armored column, 1982

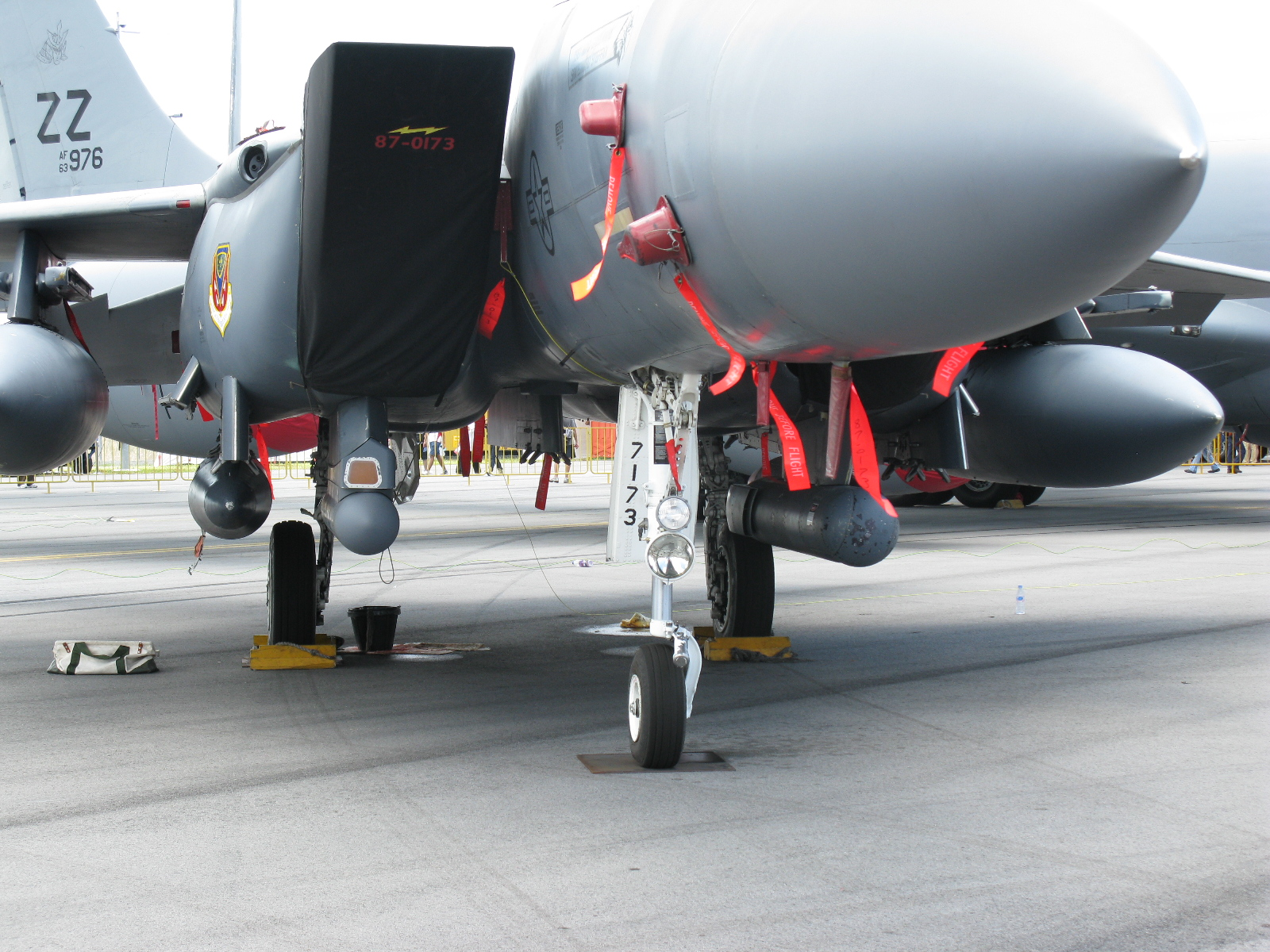
Mounted underneath an F-15E Strike Eagle, the AN/AAQ-13 navigation pod to the left with the AN/AAQ-14 targeting pod to the right. This particular F-15 was assigned to the 366th Fighter Wing (Note the emblem on the intake.)

LANTIRN (Low Altitude Navigation and Targeting Infrared for Night) is a combined navigation and targeting pod system for use on the United States Air Force fighter aircraft—the F-15E Strike Eagle and F-16 Fighting Falcon (Block 40/42 C & D models) manufactured by Martin Marietta (Lockheed Martin after the 1995 merger). LANTIRN significantly increases the combat effectiveness of these aircraft, allowing them to fly at low altitudes, at night and under-the-weather to attack ground targets with a variety of precision-guided weapons.

== Features ==
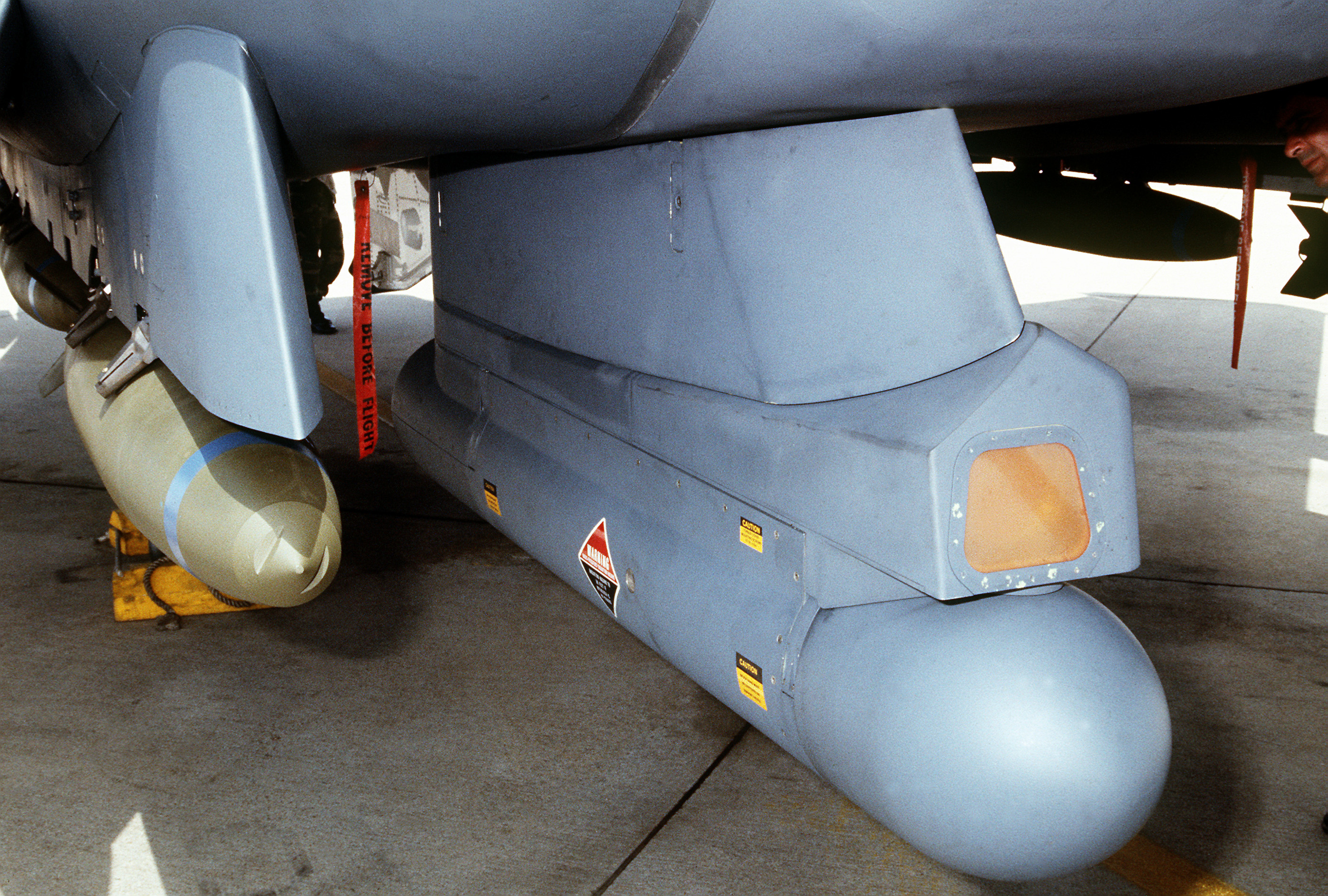
AN/AAQ-13 LANTIRN navigation pod aboard an F-15E

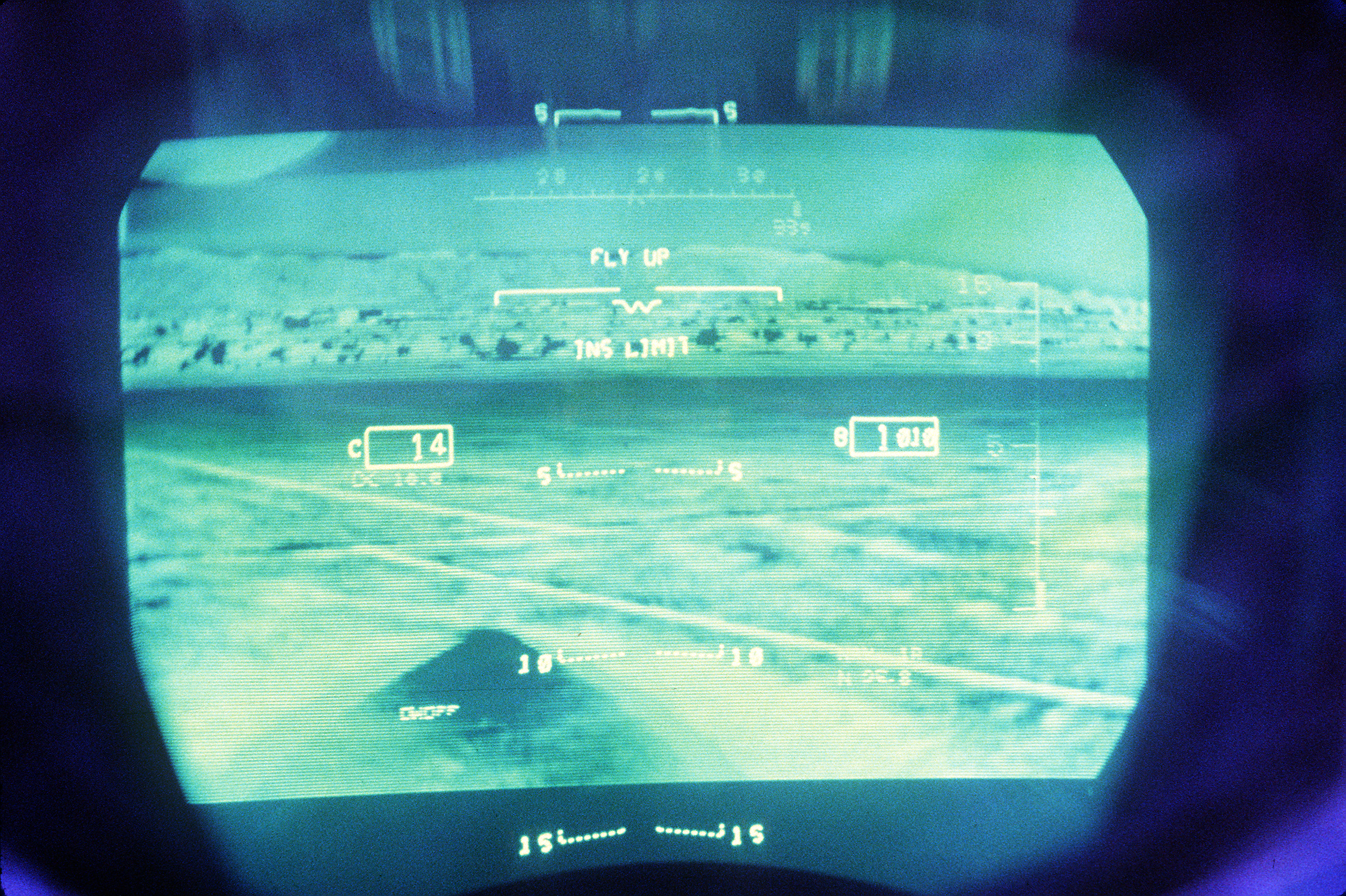
F-15E Head-up display of infrared image from the AN/AAQ-13 LANTIRN navigation pod

LANTIRN consists of a navigation pod and a targeting pod mounted externally beneath the aircraft.

=== AN/AAQ-13 navigation pod ===
The AN/AAQ-13 navigation pod provides high-speed penetration and precision attack on tactical targets at night and in adverse weather. The navigation pod contains a terrain-following radar and a fixed thermographic camera, which provides a visual cue and input to the aircraft's flight control system, enabling it to maintain a pre-selected altitude above the terrain and avoid obstacles. This sensor displays an infrared image of the terrain in front of the aircraft, to the pilot, on a Head-up display. The navigation pod enables the pilot to fly along the general contour of the terrain at high speed, using mountains, valleys and the cover of darkness to avoid detection. The pod was the USAF's first wide-field, forward looking infrared navigation system for air superiority fighters. A downgraded version for export with the terrain-following radar deleted is designated as the AN/AAQ-20 Pathfinder, which is only capable of providing a visual cue/picture of ground features in darkness and adverse weather generated by the infrared sensor, and pilots must rely on their own skill to avoid ground obstacles at low altitude flight.

=== AN/AAQ-14 targeting pod ===
The AN/AAQ-14 targeting pod contains a forward looking infrared sensor (which displays an infrared image of the target to the pilot), a laser designator/rangefinder for precise delivery of laser-guided munitions, a missile boresight correlator for automatic lock-on of the AGM-65 Maverick imaging infrared missiles, and software for automatic target tracking. These features simplify the functions of target detection, recognition and attack and permit pilots of single-seat fighters to attack targets with precision-guided weapons on a single pass. A downgraded version for export with the AGM-65 Maverick air-to-ground missile compatibility deleted is designated as AN/AAQ-19 Sharpshooter.

== Background ==
The research and development program began in September 1980 with Martin Marietta Corp. (now Lockheed Martin), Orlando, FL, as contractor. Initial operational test and evaluation of the LANTIRN navigation pod was successfully completed in December 1984. The Air Force approved low-rate initial production of the navigation pod in March 1985 and full-rate production in November 1986. The first production pod was delivered to the Air Force March 31, 1987. LANTIRN represented a major advance in the U.S. military's ability to carry out operations in darkness and adverse weather, and has been developed further into its successor, the AN/AAQ-33 Sniper pod.

== LANTIRN and the F-14 Tomcat ==
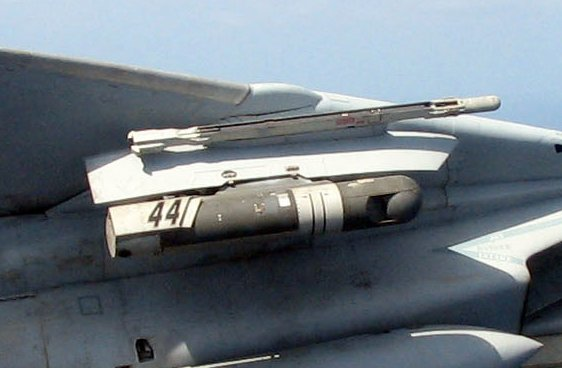
An F-14D carrying a LANTIRN pod, 2005

Until the early 1990s, the F-14 Tomcat did not have clearance to drop bombs even though all Tomcats were built with a Stores Management System (SMS) that included air-to-ground options as well as software in the AWG-9. Early flight clearance work to clear the aircraft for air-to-ground were suspended due to development delays with the F-14 and it being shifted away from the air to ground mission. With the end of the Cold War and de-emphasis on the Fleet Air Defense mission, NAVAIR had renewed flight clearance work before Desert Storm so the F-14 could carry gravity bombs as well as laser-guided bombs if the target was lased by another jet (first Tomcat LGB drop in combat was made by VF-41 in 1995 during operations over Bosnia with an F/A-18 Hornet providing the requisite target illumination). Meanwhile, the decision had been made by Chief of Naval Operations (OPNAV) to retire the A-6 Intruder altogether and allow the F-14 Block 1 Strike variant to take over as the precision strike platform for the air wing. However, the $1.6B Block 1 Strike program was canceled in budgetary cuts by 1994 with only enough funding to integrate the JDAM, which was years away. In late 1994, an unsolicited proposal from Martin Marietta was initiated to demonstrate how a USAF LANTIRN targeting pod could be rapidly integrated onto the Tomcat. This effort was done under the auspices of Commander, Naval Air Forces Atlantic Fleet (COMNAVAIRLANT) using a fleet aircraft to integrate the digital 1553-based pod on an analog F-14B. In March 1995 a VF-103 fleet aircraft successfully dropped the first laser-guided training rounds (LGTR) and quickly laser-guided bombs (LGB). Due to the early success and interest from Fleet Commanders, NAVAIR began to procure pods and control units for deployment, resulting in VF-103 receiving the first LANTIRN pod June 14, 1996 in time for its upcoming deployment.

The basic LANTIRN was modified into LANTIRN Targeting System (LTS), the navigation pod was removed from the two-pod system and the targeting pod was improved for Tomcat use. The LTS featured a Global Positioning System and inertial measurement unit that provided the pod line-of-sight cueing and weapon release ballistics and eliminated the need for external cumbersome and time-consuming boresight equipment.

Unlike the early versions, the LTS performed all weapon release calculations and presented release cues that it had generated to the aircrew. The LTS also had a masking avoidance curve display (preventing firing the laser at the jet) and eventually a north orientation curve and 12,200 m (40,000 ft) capable laser. The latter became very useful allowing F-14s to employ LGBs above potential threat systems and it came into its own in the higher terrain in Afghanistan during Operation Enduring Freedom.

The LTS could also generate coordinates for any target located on the FLIR, and a latter software modification, known as T3 (Tomcat Tactical Targeting) increased the accuracy of the coordinates produced by the LTS and allowed generated coordinates for GPS/INS guided weapons (JDAM, JSOW and WCMD). The first combat use of this was during Operation Enduring Freedom when an F-14 generated coordinates for a B-52 that dropped a CBU-103 WCMD from over 40,000 feet (12,000 m). These weapons scored hits on a vehicle convoy that had stopped after the first vehicle was destroyed by the Tomcat with LGBs.

The pod also featured an internal computer with ballistics data for the various precision munitions carried by the F-14. Data is fed to the pod by the Tomcat's AWG-9 (F-14A and F-14B) and AN/APG-71 (F-14D) radar, but the LTS in turn only sends video and guidance symbology to the crew's cockpit displays. This means that few wiring and software changes had to be made to the Tomcat in order for it to operate the LTS. All pod controls are in the RIO's cockpit, but the bomb release button is situated with the pilot. The LTS had a price tag of around 3 million US Dollars each and due to these high costs, only 75 were bought for fleet use. Typically, an F-14 squadron brought 6 to 8 pods with them on deployment, which would be permanently fitted to the non-TARPS jets.

The first combat use of the LTS was in December 1998 during Operation Desert Fox by VF-32.

== General characteristics ==
External image
- Hi-res cutaway diagram of AAQ-13 LANTIRN pod by Flight International, 2006
- AN/AAQ-13 LANTIRN navigation pod

- Primary function: Low altitude navigation and targeting infrared for night flying
- Manufacturer: Lockheed Martin
- Length: Navigation pod, 78.2 in (199 cm); targeting pod, 98.5 in (250 cm)
- Diameter: Navigation pod, 12 in (30 cm); targeting pod, 15 in (38 cm)
- Weight: Navigation pod, 451.1 lb (204.6 kg); targeting pod, 530 lb (240 kg)
- Aircraft: F-15E Strike Eagle, F-16A/B Fighting Falcon Block 20 (MLU), F-16C/D Fighting Falcon Block 40, F-14 B/D Tomcat, S-3 Viking
- Sensors: Infrared and terrain following radar sensors on the navigation pod. Infrared and laser designator and ranging sensors on the targeting pod
- Introduction date: March 1987
- Unit cost: Navigation pod, US$1.38 million; targeting pod, US$3.6 million

== Operators ==
- Belgian Air Component
- Egyptian Air Force
- Hellenic Air Force
- Israeli Air Force
- Republic of China Air Force
- Republic of Korea Air Force
- Republic of Singapore Air Force
- Royal Netherlands Air and Space Force
- Turkish Air Force
- United States Air Force
- United States Navy

== See also ==
- ATFLIR
- LITENING AN/AAQ-28(V)
- Lockheed Martin Sniper XR
- Thales Damocles
- PDLCT
- List of military electronics of the United States
