= Filat (disambiguation) =

Filat or FILAT may refer to

- Vlad Filat, Moldovan politician
- Filat, the Albanian name of the city and district of Filiates, Greece
- FILAT, Forward-looking Infrared and Laser Attack Targeting pod
