= Dassault Mirage 2000N/2000D =

French nuclear and conventional strike aircraft

Mirage 2000N/D
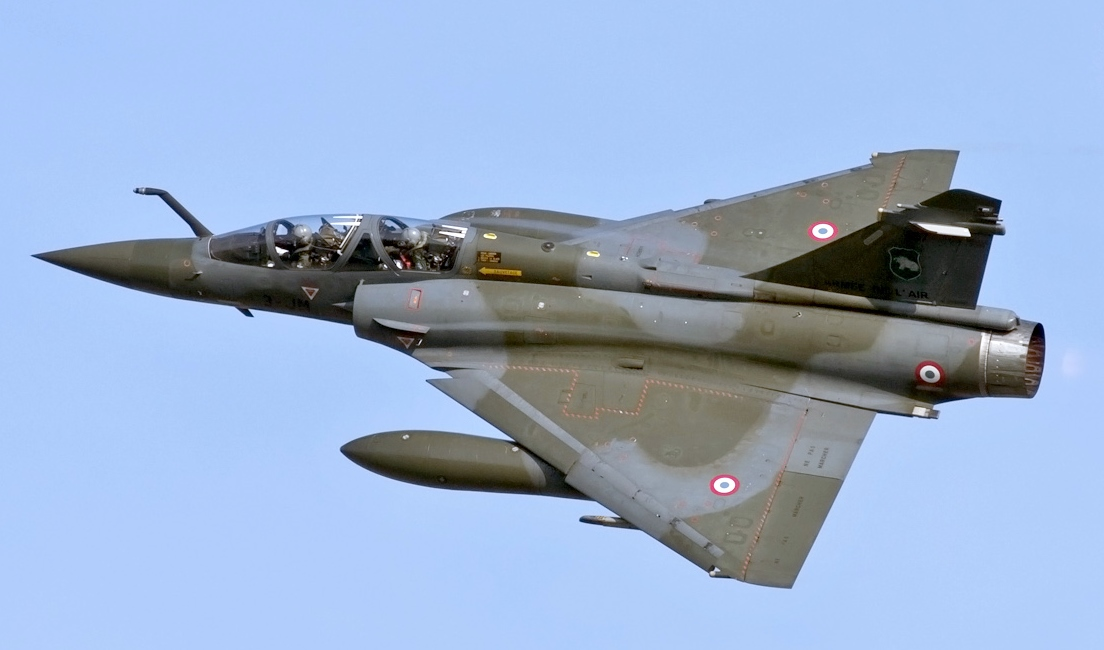
- A Mirage 2000D flying over RIAT in 2016

General information
- Type: Multirole combat aircraft
- National origin: France
- Manufacturer: Dassault Aviation
- Status: Active (2000D only)
- Primary user: French Air and Space Force
- Number built: 161 (75 Mirage 2000N and 86 Mirage 2000D)

History
- First flight: 3 February 1986
- Retired: 2018 (2000N)
- Developed from: Mirage 2000

The Dassault Mirage 2000N is a variant of the Mirage 2000 designed for nuclear strike. It formed the core of the French air-based strategic nuclear deterrent. The Mirage 2000D is its conventional attack counterpart.

== Development ==
The Mirage 2000N was designed to French requirements for an aircraft to replace the older Mirage IV which weren't modernized to the P standard. Dassault received a contract to build two prototypes. The aircraft first flew on 3 February 1986. Seventy four were built up to 1993.

The Mirage 2000N is based on the Mirage 2000B two-seat trainer, but features considerable changes. The airframe was strengthened for low-level flight and fitted with an Antilope 5 radar, which is used for terrain following, navigation and ground mapping, and which can follow terrain at 1,112 km/h (691 mph). Other avionic features are twin INS units and moving map displays for both the pilot and weapon systems officer. The Mirage 2000N can carry one ASMP medium-range nuclear missile, and can also carry two MATRA Magic AAMs for self-defence. Other protection features include the Sabre jamming system and the Spirale chaff system. Because the extra seat decreases range, a pair of drop tanks are carried. Since the Mirage 2000N's standard weapon was the ASMP, which was carried on the centerline pylon, this meant that it could not carry a centerline tank, but a distinctive big 2,000 litre (530 US gallon) underwing drop tank with a bulbous nose was developed to more than compensate.

The first batch of 30 aircraft for the French Air Force had a sole nuclear capability, and these were designated Mirage 2000N-K1. These did not have the Spirale chaff system, and carried a pair of AN.52 free-fall nuclear bombs before the ASMP was ready. The later batch of 44 aircraft were designated Mirage 2000N-K2. These had both a nuclear and conventional capability, and a full defensive fit. The K1 aircraft now have a limited conventional attack capability.

Dassault has also developed the Mirage 2000D, which is a development of the Mirage 2000N designed for long-range precision strikes with conventional weapons. This aircraft is exactly the same as the Mirage 2000N, but introduces support for conventional attack missiles such as the Apache and Scalp missiles, as well as the AASM weapons. The first aircraft, converted from the Mirage 2000N prototype, flew on 19 February 1991, and the French Air Force ordered a total of 86 aircraft.

Like the Mirage 2000N, the Mirage 2000D had variants. The Mirage 2000D-R1 does not have the full weapons capability of the Mirage 2000D-R2, which features the Apache and Scalp missiles, the ATLIS II laser designation system, and the Samir self-protection fit.

== Operational history ==
=== Operation Deny Flight and Deliberate Force ===
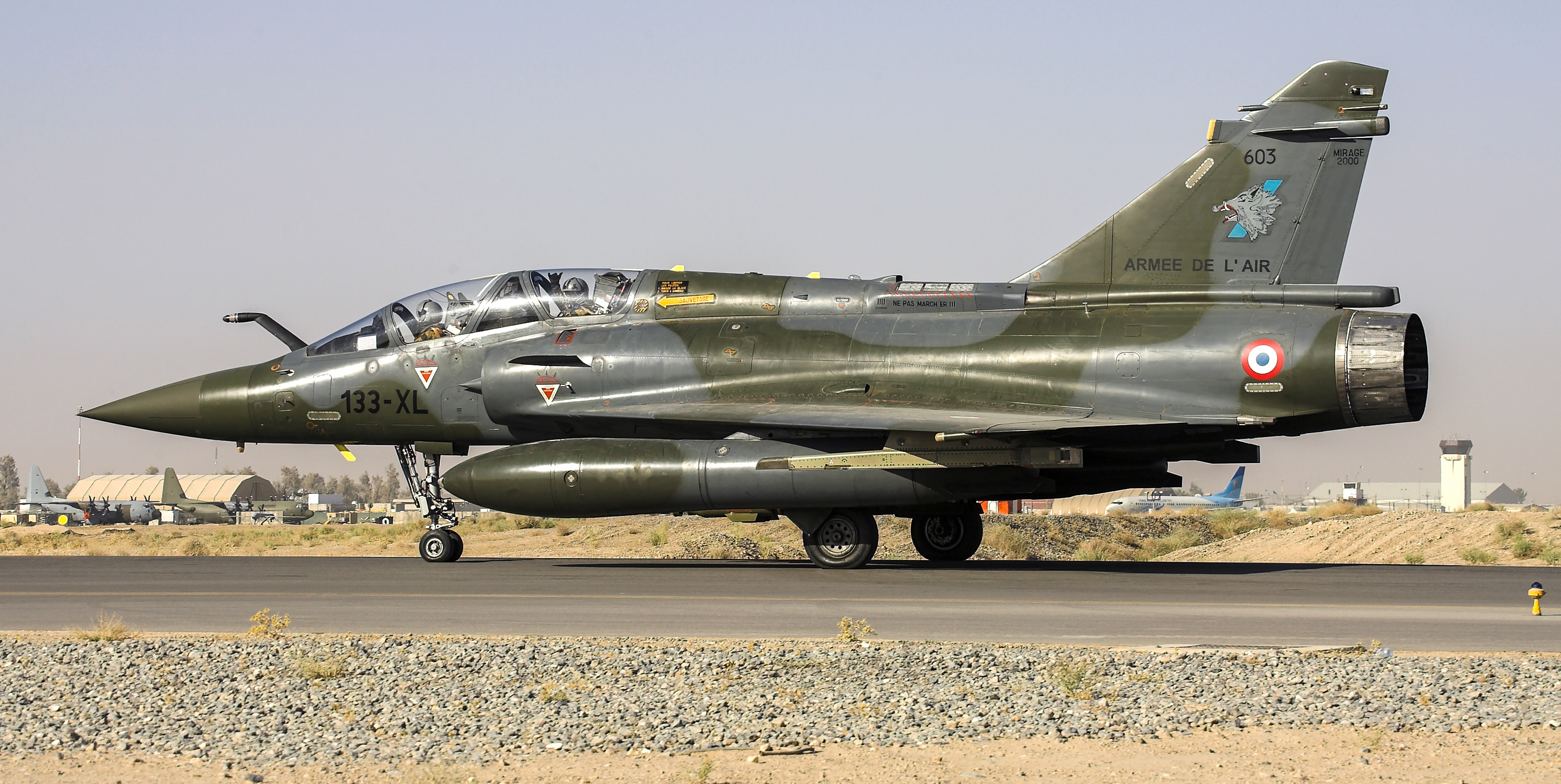
2000D 603 of 3/3 "Ardennes" at Kandahar, 2010

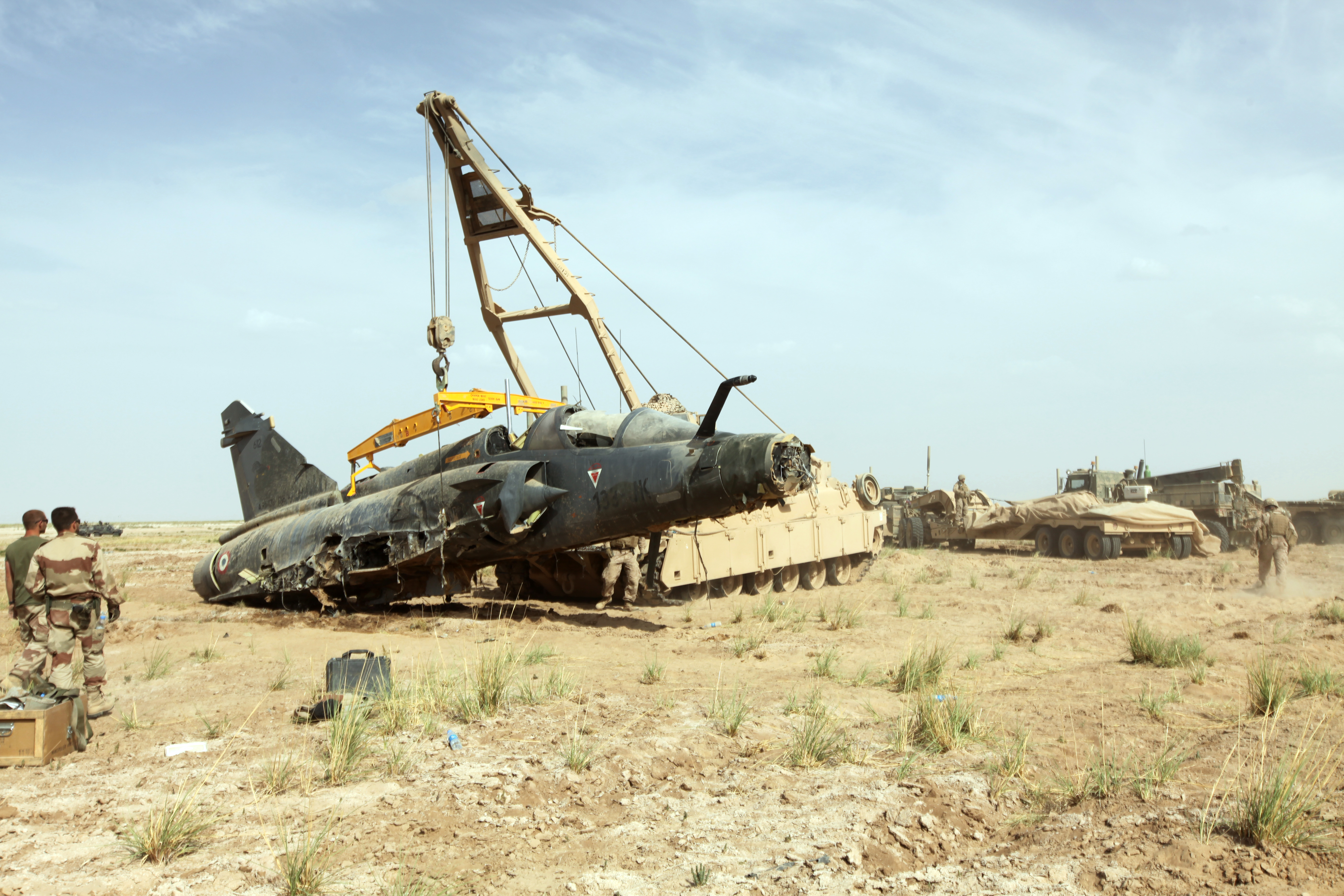
An M88 Recovery Vehicle hoists the body of a crashed French Mirage 2000D aircraft of Nancy – Ochey Air Base during a recovery mission on 27 May 2011. The crash occurred in the Bakwa district of Regional Command West in Afghanistan.

French Mirage 2000s were prominent participants in UN and NATO air operations over the former Yugoslavia. On 30 August 1995, one Mirage 2000N-K2 was shot down over Bosnia by a MANPADS heat-seeking 9K38 Igla missile fired by air defence units of the Army of Republika Srpska during Operation Deliberate Force, prompting efforts to obtain improved defensive systems.

=== Operation Enduring Freedom and ISAF ===
AdA Mirage 2000Ds served in the intervention in Afghanistan in 2001–2002, operating in close conjunction with international forces and performing precision attacks with LGBs. The French Air Force deployed the Mirage 2000D to Manas Air Base in Kyrgyzstan from 2002 to 2004 to support coalition forces in Afghanistan. Then from 2004 to 2007, they stayed at Dushanbe, Tajikistan. In summer 2007, after the Rafale fighters have been removed from the theater of operations, 3 French Mirage 2000s were deployed to Afghanistan in support of NATO troops. To shorten the response time to support NATO ISAF troops in southern Afghanistan, the aircraft moved to Kandahar International Airport. Three Rafale F2 and three Mirage 2000Ds operate from Kandahar in 2008. On 24 May 2011, a French Air Force Mirage 2000D crashed 100 kilometers west of Farah. Both crew members successfully ejected and were recovered.

=== Opération Harmattan and Unified Protector ===
French Air Force Mirage 2000D were committed since the beginning to the enforcement of the Libyan no-fly-zone that was approved by the UN in March 2011. The Mirage 2000Ds were among the first strikers: on 19 March 2011, a mixed French formation of Mirage 2000s and Rafales hit a Libyan army column that was heading for Benghazi with several vehicles destroyed. The Mirage 2000D remained one of the most used striker for the next months when Opération Harmattan was succeeded by the UN led Operation Unified Protector. On 20 October 2011, a Mirage 2000D dropped the last NATO munitions of the war, when a mixed formation of a French Air Force Mirage 2000D and a Mirage F1CR was vectored to strike an armed convoy which was trying to break through the rebels' lines at Sirte. The Mirage 2000D dropped its two laser guided GBU-12 bombs hitting and stopping Gaddafi's convoy, resulting in his capture and death.

=== Operation Serval and Operation Barkhane ===
French forces became actively involved in the Northern Mali conflict (2012–present) starting from 11 January 2013 with Operation Serval. The six Mirage 2000Ds based in N'Djamena, Chad for the long lasting French military presence in that country, alongside the two Mirage F.1CR based there, were among the first forces committed to the conflict, bombing the Islamic militants’ bases and forces in Northern Mali. The Mirages were flying with a similar configuration to the one used over Libya nearly two years before, with two 500 lbs GBU-12 (laser) or GBU-49 (GPS and laser) guided bombs on the centerline pylon, and two external fuel tanks on the inboard wing pylons.

Starting from 17 January 2013, three of the Mirages were relocated in Bamako, Mali, preceded by the two simpler Mirage F.1CR which started operating from Bamako few days before.

Locally deployed Mirage 2000D/N French Air and Space Force aircraft keep supporting the successor Operation Barkhane.

=== Opération Chammal ===
Starting on 19 September 2014, the French Air Force started striking the Islamic State of Iraq and the Levant as part of an international effort against the terrorist organization. The strike force was initially composed of Dassault Rafale jets based in the Emirates. Later, the Rafales were sided by six Mirage 2000D, based in Jordan, starting from November 2014. Initially the strikes were limited to targets located in Iraq. Starting from September 2015, the strikes were extended over Syria as well.

On 21 August 2016, a strike group composed of 4 Rafales and 4 Mirage 2000D launched a multiple SCALP-EG cruise missile attack against Islamic State weapon storage site, firing 12 missiles. The Rafales were armed with two cruise missiles each, while the Mirages were armed with one cruise missile each.

== Variants ==
=== Mirage 2000N ===
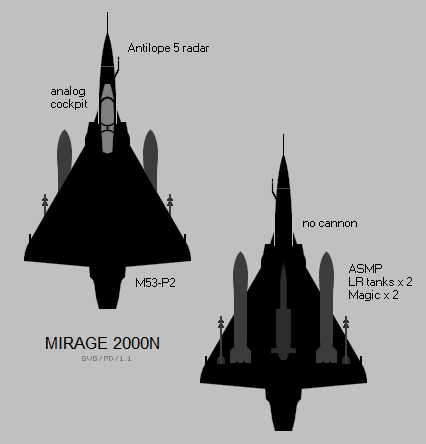

The Mirage 2000N was the nuclear strike variant which was intended to carry the Aerospatiale Air-Sol Moyenne Portée (ASMP) nuclear stand-off missile. Initial flight tests of two prototypes began on 3 February 1983, and the Mirage 2000N entered operational service in 1988. A total of 75 were built. The fighter had strengthened wings for low-altitude operations, as well as low-level precision navigation/attack systems, built around the Dassault/Thales Antilope 5 radar, which was designed for the strike role and featured a terrain-avoidance capability.

==== Upgrades ====
- The existing kit was enhanced to provide an electronic intelligence (ELINT) capability, allowing the aircraft to record data on adversary emitters for post-flight intelligence analysis.
- A SAT Samir "Detecteur de Depart Missile (DDM)" missile-warning system was also added, being attached to the back of the Magic AAM pylons.

Aircraft with the updated countermeasures system and capable of carrying both the ASMP-A missile and the Pod Reco NG will be redesignated "Mirage 2000N-K3".

As it is forbidden to export them (due to their nuclear strike role), they are being dismantled for parts with some being donated to French museums. 3 remain with the DGA for testing.

Currently, four aircraft are preserved: 305-116-CS, all of which are in good condition with no missing parts.

=== Mirage 2000D ===
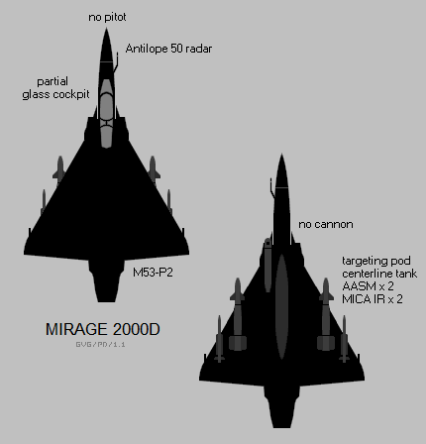

Delays in the Dassault Rafale fourth-generation fighter program led to a development program for an updated Mirage 2000N dedicated to conventional attack, originally designated Mirage 2000N cousin. It was to complement the SEPECAT Jaguar daylight strike fighters by providing a night/bad weather attack capability.

Formal development began in 1988. The designation was changed to Mirage 2000D in 1990, with the "D" standing for "Diversifie/Multirole". Initial flight of the Mirage 2000D prototype, a modified Mirage 2000N prototype, was on 19 February 1991. That led to first flight of a production aircraft 31 March 1993 and introduction to service in April 1995. 86 Mirage 2000Ds were built in all to last delivery in 2001.

The Mirage 2000D featured:

- An NVG-compatible cockpit, with improved "hands on throttle and stick (HOTAS)" controls and a partial "glass cockpit" arrangement. The pilot obtained a second display, and the back-seater received two more for a total of three in the rear.
- A modernized ULISS 52P navigation system with Global Positioning System (GPS) capability,
- An improved Antilope 50 terrain-following system.
- An updated "ICMS Mk2" countermeasures system, with SERVAL RWR, Chameleon jammer, and Spirale dispensers.

Full-specification Mirage 2000D-R1 aircraft could carry stores such as:

- All major dumb munitions, such as iron bombs, Belouga cluster bombs, Durandal runway breaker bombs, BAP 100 and BAP 120 clusters, Matra 68 millimeter rocket pods, and cannon pods.
- Laser-guided weapons such as the AS-30L ASM or French and US LGBs, with the munitions directed by an ATLIS II or improved optical-infrared PDLCT and high-resolution PDLCTS targeting pods, attached to a pylon under the right air intake. The navigator/WSO in the back seat handled laser targeting while the pilot in the front flew the aircraft. The Mirage 2000D has been cleared for operational use of the next generation Damocles Targeting Pod.
- The ARMAT antiradar missile, though this is rarely carried.

==== Upgrades ====
The Mirage 2000D remains in service, with various improvements such as the MICA IR. A general upgrade designated Mirage 2000D-R2 machine was delivered from 2001. A second upgrade program was begun in 2009, with better support for the strike role and improvement of air-to-air capabilities. This provided a multirole capability that compensated for the eventual retirement of the Mirage 2000Cs.

55 aircraft are undergoing a mid-life upgrade known as Mirage 2000D RMV (Rénovation Mi-Vie) until 2024 with the objective of keeping them in service until well after 2030. This involves updating the avionics, providing a CC422 gun pod, replacing the Magic missiles with the MICA, and integrating the GBU-48 and GBU-50, at a total cost of 532.5 million euro. The first of these modernised aircraft was accepted in a ceremony held in April 2025; at the time, it was reported that the Mirage 2000D is expected to be in French service until at least 2035.

A pair of Mirage 2000D RMV was deployed in early September 2021 to Djibouti to evaluate their performance in hot-weather climatic conditions. The two Mirage 2000D RMV stayed for 20 days at the Base Aérienne (Air Base) 188 Djibouti with the Escadron de Chasse et d’Expérimentation (Fighter and Experimental Squadron) 1/30 “Côte d’Argent”.

== Operators ==
France

- French Air and Space Force (Armée de l'air et de l'espace)

== Notable accidents and incidents ==
On 1 March 2011 one Mirage 2000N crashed in Creuse region of central France near the village of Saint-Oradoux-pres-Crocq during a night flight. Both pilots were killed.

On 24 May 2011 one Mirage 2000D crashed 100 kilometers west of Farah, Afghanistan. Both crew members successfully ejected and were recovered.

On 14 January 2012 during joint training exercise "Green Shield" simulating an air combat over Saudi Arabia, a French Mirage 2000D collided with a Saudi F-15S. Both aircraft were destroyed, while the three pilots ejected safely.

On 9 June 2014, in the evening, a French Air Force Mirage 2000D crashed halfway between Gao in northern Mali and the Niger capital Niamey due to a technical issue while part of Operation Serval. Both pilots ejected safely and were recovered.

In the morning of 28 September 2017, a French Air Force Mirage 2000N caught fire and crashed just after take-off from the airport of the Chadian capital of Ndjamena while part of Operation Barkhane. The plane crashed into the airport wall at 7:55, before catching fire while preparing to take off from the runway on its way to France. The two pilots ejected from the aircraft in time; one was slightly injured.

On 18 April 2018 the warhead of an inert bomb was accidentally dropped onto the roof of a car factory in Loiretaine, Nogent-sur-Vernisson, France as a pair of French Air Force Mirage 2000D fighters flew over the factory on their way to a training exercise at the Suippes training ground. Two people were injured, and the factory was evacuated until it was determined the warhead was not dangerous.

On 9 January 2019, shortly before noon, a French Air Force Mirage 2000D crashed as it flew over the Jura mountains in the east of France. Another jet which was on the same patrol had safely returned to Nancy-Ochey air base. Both pilots were killed in the crash.

== Specifications (Mirage 2000D/N) ==
Data from

General characteristics

- Crew: 2
- Length: 14.55 m (47 ft 9 in)
- Wingspan: 9.13 m (29 ft 11 in)
- Height: 5.15 m (16 ft 11 in)
- Wing area: 41 m^{2} (440 sq ft)
- Empty weight: 7,600 kg (16,755 lb)
- Gross weight: 10,680 kg (23,545 lb)
- Max takeoff weight: 17,000 kg (37,479 lb)
- Powerplant: 1 × SNECMA M53-P2 afterburning turbofan engine, 64 kN (14,000 lbf) thrust dry, 95.1 kN (21,400 lbf) with afterburner

Performance

- Maximum speed: 1,728 km/h (1,074 mph, 933 kn)
- Maximum speed: Mach 1,4
- Combat range: 1,480 km (920 mi, 800 nmi)
- Ferry range: 3,340 km (2,080 mi, 1,800 nmi)
- Service ceiling: 18,000 m (59,000 ft)
- Rate of climb: 285 m/s (56,100 ft/min)
- Wing loading: 410 kg/m^{2} (84 lb/sq ft)
- Thrust/weight: *Propulsive efficiency: 0.91 (non dimensional)

Armament

- Hardpoints: 4× under-wing, 4× under fuselage, 1× centerline , with provisions to carry combinations of:
  - Rockets:
    - Up to 4× Matra SNEB 68-mm 18-round rocket pods on the four underwing hardpoints
  - Missiles:
    - Air-to-air missiles:
      - Up to 4× R550 Magic air-to-air missiles for self-defence, normally 2 on the outboard underwing pylons
      - Up to 6× MICA air-to-air missiles for self-defence, normally 2 on the outboard underwing pylons
    - Air-to-surface missiles: – Mirage 2000N
      - 1× ASMP medium-range nuclear missile on the centerline pylon
    - Air-to-surface missiles: – Mirage 2000D
      - 1× Apache anti-runway cruise missile on the centerline pylon
      - 1× SCALP EG air-launched cruise missile on the centerline pylon
      - 2× AS-30L laser-guided missiles on the inboard underwing pylons
  - Bombs:
    - AASM 125, 250, 1000 Kg laser, ISN/GPS, IIR guided bombs. The lighter versions are carried in pairs on the centerline and inboard wing hardpoints and one under each of the four fuselage hardpoints
    - up to 10× GBU-12 227 Kg laser-guided bombs or GBU-49 227 Kg INS/GPS and laser guided bombs, in pairs on the centerline and inboard wing hardpoints and one under each of the four fuselage hardpoints
    - up to 3× GBU-16 454 Kg laser-guided bombs on the centerline and inboard wing hardpoints
    - up to 3× GBU-10 907 Kg laser-guided bombs on the centerline and inboard wing hardpoints
    - up to 3× GBU-24 907 Kg laser-guided bombs on the centerline and inboard wing hardpoints
    - up to 3× BGL-400 400 Kg laser-guided bombs on the centerline and inboard wing hardpoints
    - up to 3× BGL-1000 1000 Kg laser-guided bombs on the centerline and inboard wing hardpoints
  - Other:
    - ATLIS II laser/electro-optical targeting pod on the front-right fuselage hardpoint
    - PDLCT laser/electro-optical targeting pod on the front-right fuselage hardpoint
    - Damoclès laser targeting pod on the front-right fuselage hardpoint
    - 1× centerline mounted 345-gallon drop tank 2x either 375, 440 or 530 gallon tanks for ferry flight/extended range/loitering time
    - up to 2× 30 mm CC630 gun pods with 600 rounds per pod, one on each inboard wing hardpoint

Avionics

- Twin inertial navigation system
- Antilope 5 terrain-following radar

== See also ==
Related development

- Dassault Mirage 2000
- Dassault Mirage 4000

=== Aircraft of comparable role, configuration and era ===
- McDonnell Douglas F-15E Strike Eagle
- General Dynamics F-16 Fighting Falcon

== Bibliography ==
- Carbonel, Jean-Christophe (2016). French Secret Projects. Vol. 1: Post War Fighters. Manchester, UK: Crecy Publishing. ISBN 978-1-91080-900-6.
