= Blue Sky (navigation pod) =

Blue Sky is a combined airborne navigation and targeting pod system for Chinese military aircraft. It is designed to provide aircraft with all-weather/night-attack capabilities. It is the Chinese equivalent of the United States Air Force LANTIRN system. Several derivatives have already been developed since its public debut.

== History ==
It was first revealed to the public at the 1998 Zhuhai Air Show, and it is designed by CLETRI, more commonly known as the 607th Institute.

=== 1st generation ===
Most detailed information released by the developer is that for the first-generation Blue Sky navigational pod, which consists of five parts: terrain following radar, wide-field forward looking infrared, environmental control unit (ECU), computer system (NPCC) and power system (NPPW).

- size: 0.295 cubic metre
- weight: 200 kg
- maximum aircraft speed: 900 km/hour
- minimum altitude: 60 metre
- maximum continuous operation in terrain following mode at minimum altitude: > 50 minutes
- g force: -1 g to + 12 g
- FLIR range: > 10 km
- Radar range: > 15 km

In comparison to the first-generation LANTIRN, the radar range of the Blue Sky navigational pod is 25% longer than the 12 km range of TFR in AN/AAQ-13, but still less than the 24 km range of the second-generation LANTIRN. Built–in test (BITE) function is also incorporated.

=== 2nd generation ===
The second-generation Blue Sky navigational pod was also first publicized at the Zhuhai Air Show, several years later. The main improvement included the increased MTBF, longer continuous operational times in terrain following mode, incorporating SAR mode up to 3 meter resolution.

The terrain following radar is also upgraded to incorporated fire control capability, though this practice is not recommended by the developer because doing so would reveal the aircraft thus providing the enemy with longer reaction times. However, the fire control capability could be an asset when the second-generation pod is carried by attack aircraft without radars such as those converted from trainers. Open architecture of software programming and modular design are also incorporated.

=== 3rd generation ===
At 6th Zhuhai Air Show in 2006, the developer of Blue Sky navigational pod revealed that the third-generation Blue Sky navigational/attack pod has already entered Chinese service, though due to security reasons, the actual pod was not shown at the air show, and very little information is released except the following:

- The minimum altitude of terrain following mode is further reduced to 30 meter from the original 60 meter.
- The maximum radar range is increased to over 30 km from the original 15 km
- SAR mode up to 1 meter resolution from the original 3 meter
- Increased continuous operational times in terrain following mode
- Further increased MTBF.
- Open architecture software programming
- Modular design of the hardware.
- Option to upgrade to MIL-STD-1773 STD compatibility

== Future development ==
Staff of CLETRI, the developer of the Blue Sky navigational/attack pod also revealed at the 6th Zhuhai Air Show in 2006 that the next-generation pod is under development, utilizing phased-array antenna for the new terrain-following radar. Just like the AN/AAQ-19 Pathfinder navigational pod, a simplified AN/AAQ-13 developed as a cheaper alternative, a similar cheaper alternative for Blue Sky navigational/attack pod has also been developed by simplifying the pod via the deletion of the terrain following radar; however, the name and designation of this derivative is unknown and there is no known success of sales either.
