= TIALD =

Targeting pod

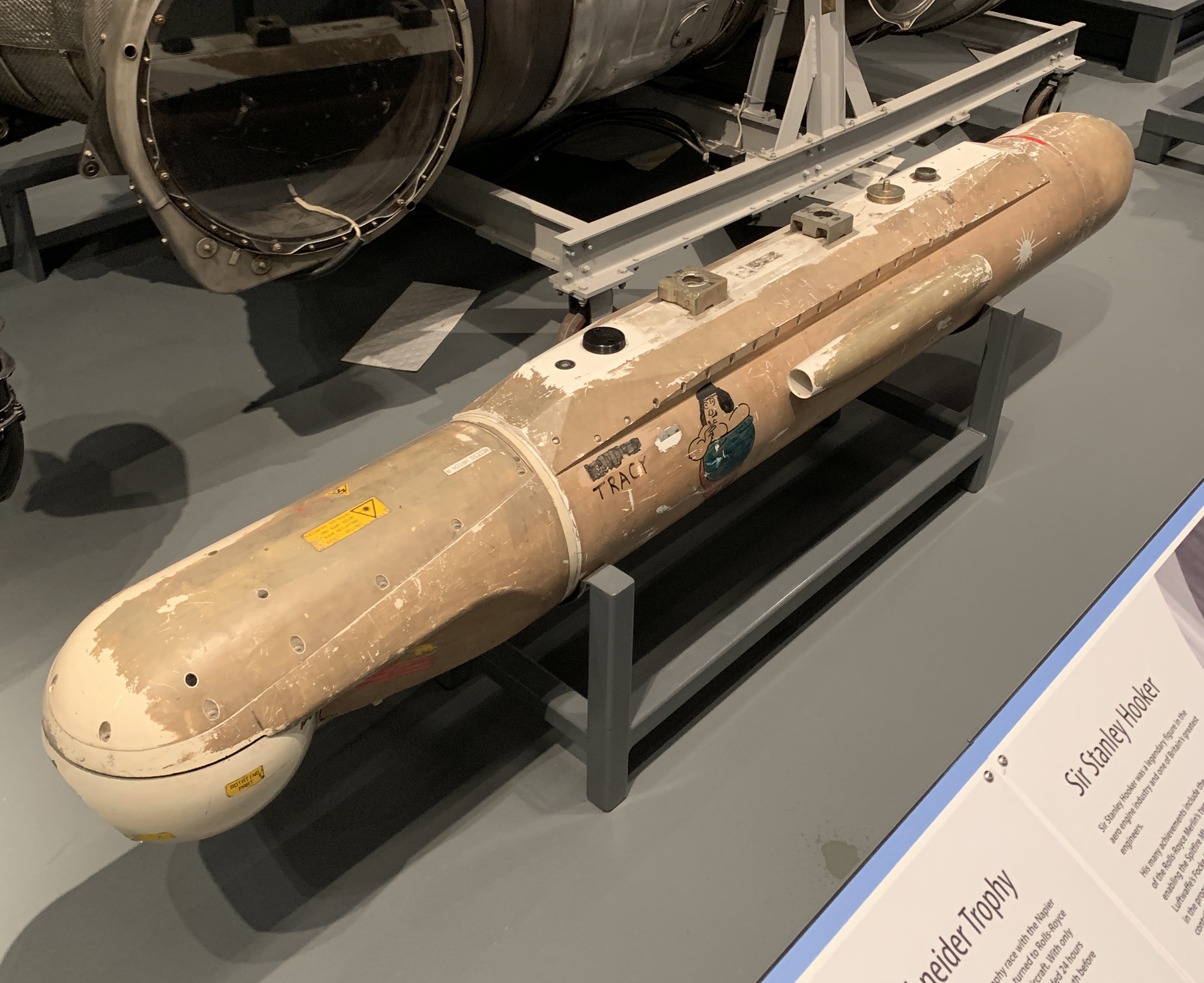
TIALD pod at The Royal Air Force Museum London

The Thermal Imaging Airborne Laser Designator (TIALD) was a targeting pod manufactured by Ferranti/GEC Marconi in the late 1980s and 1990s, and was the UK's primary laser designator for its Paveway series of laser-guided bombs (LGBs).

== History ==
The RAF's first laser designators were Westinghouse Electric Corporation Pave Spike pods fitted to Blackburn Buccaneers which entered service in 1979. As these were limited to daylight use, the Ministry of Defence initiated studies for a new laser designator. The first operational use of LGBs by the UK's armed forces were the RAF Harrier attacks on Argentine forces during the Falklands War. Laser designation for these attacks was carried out by a forward air controller using a ground designator.

In 1988 a Ferranti-led consortium was awarded a contract for development of its TIALD laser designator pod for use on the Panavia Tornado. The Ferranti pod incorporated thermal imagers from GEC-Marconi and automatic video tracking equipment from British Aerospace. The first use of the TIALD pod occurred during trials in May 1990 where a Buccaneer guided Paveway II bombs dropped from a Tornado.

The 1990 Iraqi invasion of Kuwait saw the TIALD pod rushed into service on Tornado GR1s in just 46 days. In the resultant Gulf War, two pre-production TIALD pods were used to guide 229 LGBs to their targets.

The TIALD pod was used extensively following the Gulf War including during the Iraqi no-fly zone patrols (1991–2003), the related Operation Desert Fox (1998), Operation Deliberate Force, Bosnia (1995), the Kosovo War (1999) and the 2003 Iraq Conflict.

In March 1995 the RAF received the first upgraded SEPECAT Jaguar aircraft capable of operating the TIALD pod. The upgrade required both hardware and software updates of the type. Integration on the Harrier GR7 commenced in 1996.

=== Manufacturer ===
Due to the corporate history of its parent companies, the manufacturer of the TIALD pod has been known as Ferranti, Ferranti International, GEC-Ferranti/GEC-Marconi, BAE Systems Avionics, and Selex ES.

=== Replacement ===
Experience in Afghanistan lead to the realisation that TIALD was outdated, as described by an RAF Wing Commander:

"[It] was designed in the 1980s, to allow pilots to drop laser guided bombs on targets like bridges, big buildings and aircraft hangars... TIALD as an air interdiction targeting pod is very good and has done this reasonably well over the last decade, as was proved in Deliberate Force (1995), Allied Force (1999), and Operation Telic (2003). Now, however, we need a sensor that is geared more towards urban [close air support], where we need to defend particular targets that are very similar to others, like compounds within small towns or villages."

The TIALD pod was replaced by the LITENING targeting pod on Tornados. The Sniper pod replaced TIALD on Harriers following an urgent operational requirement in 2007.
