= Targeting pod =

Device used to detect enemy munitions and airplanes

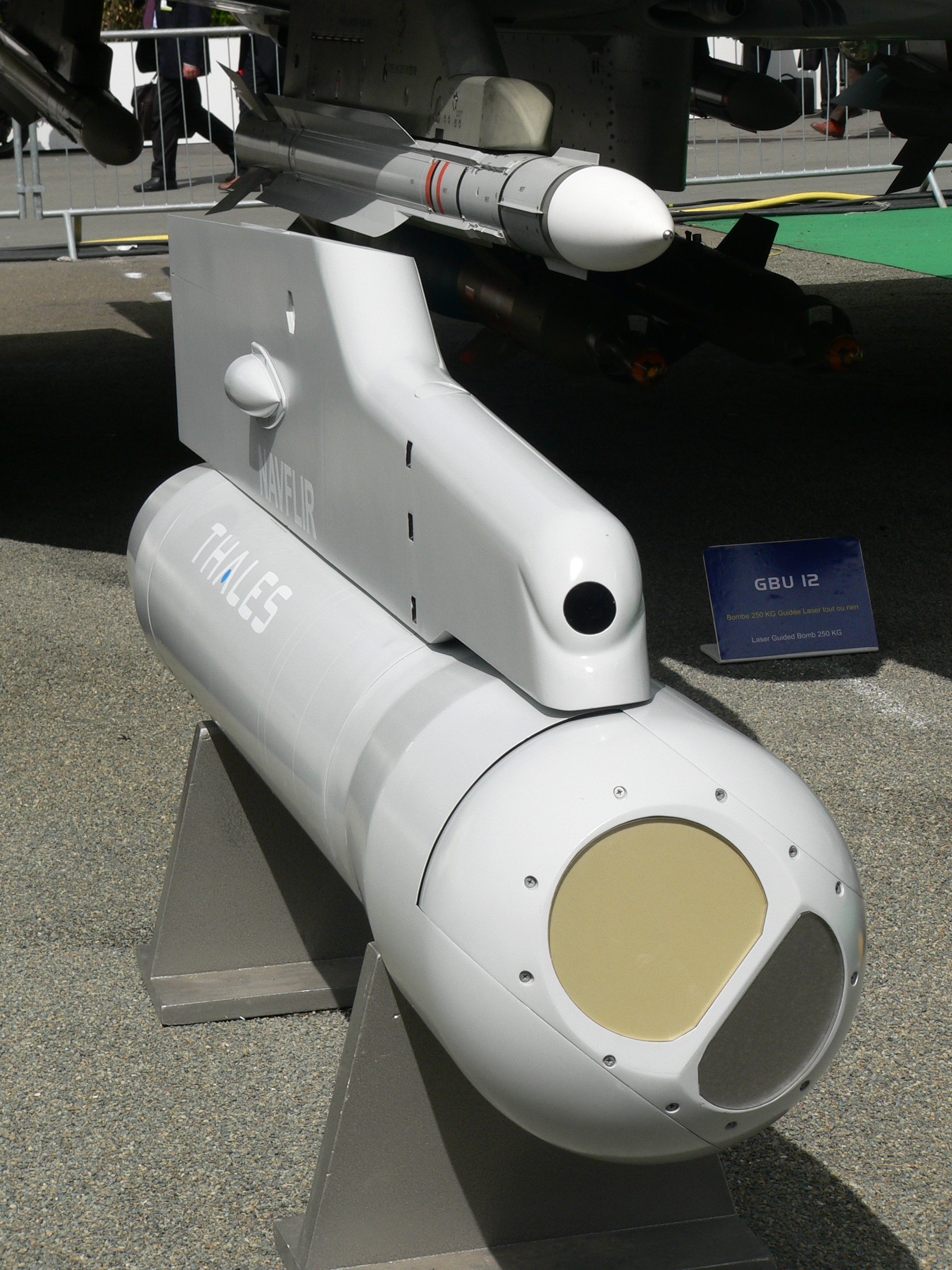
A Thales Damocles target designation pod combined with a NAVFLIR imager

Targeting pods (TGP) are target designation tools used by attack aircraft for identifying targets and guiding precision-guided munition (PGM) such as laser-guided bombs to those targets. The first targeting pods were developed in conjunction with the earliest generation of PGMs in the mid-1960s.

== Categories ==
=== Laser designators ===
The design of laser-guided bombs requires a "laser spot tracker" that locates reflected pulsed laser light from a designated target. This enables an aircraft's targeting system to home in on that specific target. The simplest spot trackers, such as the Pave Penny pod, have no laser at all, just a laser sensor.

Some targeting systems incorporate a laser rangefinder, a laser beam that can calculate the precise range to a target and communicate that information to the nav/attack system. Many targeting pods or installations use the same sensor as the laser spot tracker to receive the reflected rangefinder signal, so they can perform both ranging and tracking. These are called laser ranger and marked target seeker (LRMTS).

Some targeting systems have a laser that can designate a target for laser-guided munitions, enabling the aircraft to designate its own targets or designate for other friendly units. LRMTS installations (particularly fixed internal units) of the 1970s often did not have a laser of sufficient power and slant range to designate targets, although they could provide rangefinding. Such units required targets to be designated by a ground designator or forward air controller in another aircraft.

=== Electro-optics ===
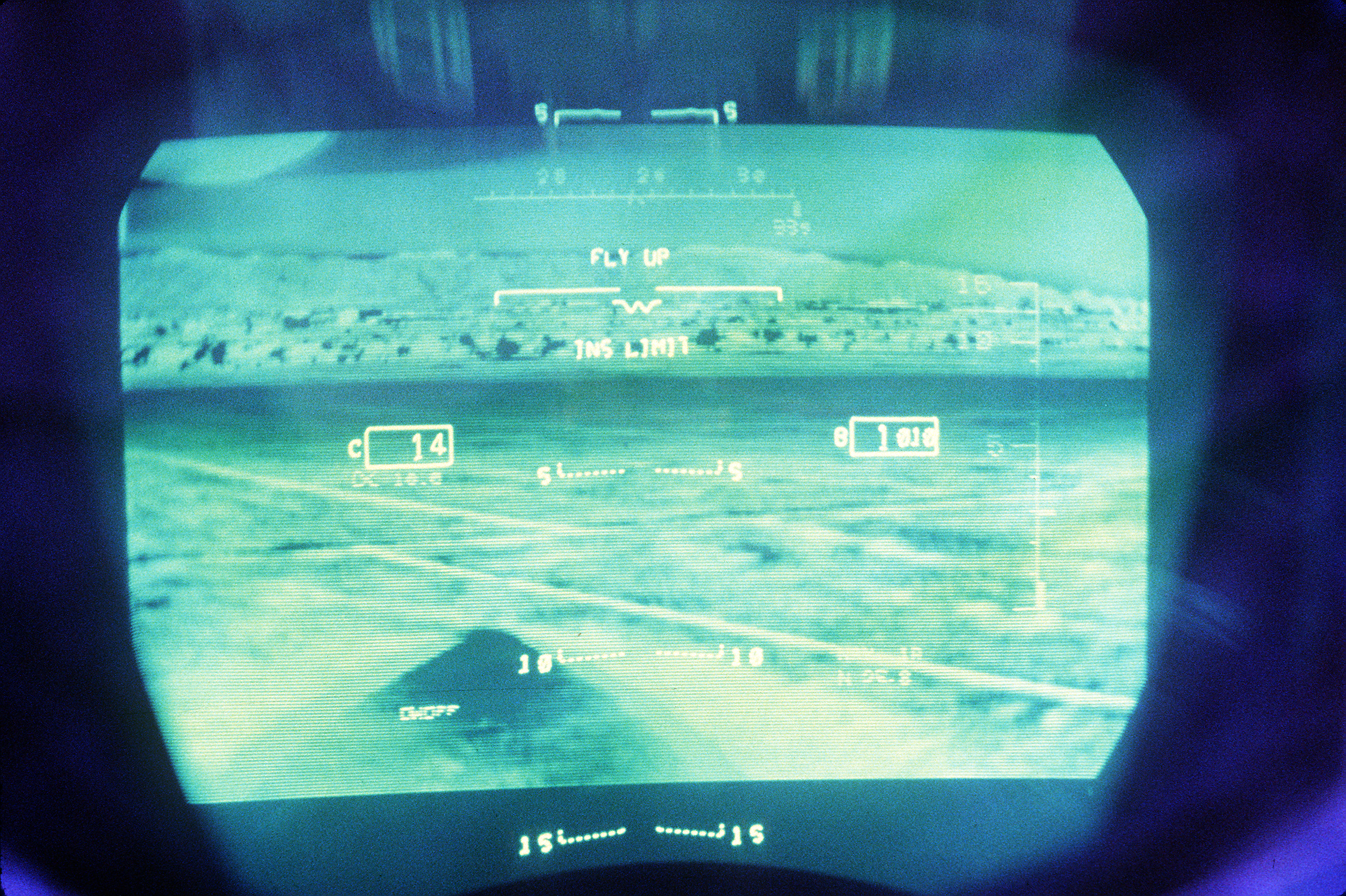
F-15E heads-up display of infrared image from LANTIRN.

The basic electro-optical (EO) sensor is essentially a video camera, usually with a magnification lens, helping the aircrew to locate and identify targets. For night and adverse weather use, many EO sensors incorporate low-light light-amplification systems. Some pods supplement the basic visual EO with forward-looking infrared (FLIR) to aid in locating and identifying targets in darkness. Such systems are sometimes called infrared search and track sensors.

=== Radar ===
Some pods may contain a small radar set for targeting and navigation, particularly for aircraft that have no search radar. Such a system, for example, was developed for the unsuccessful N/AW (Night/Adverse Weather) version of the USAF A-10 Thunderbolt II. Currently, laser and infrared systems are more common than radar because they are less easily detected by adversaries, providing less warning to the target. Lasers can also provide more accurate ranging data for aerial gunnery.

== List of targeting pods ==
=== Laser spot tracker pods ===
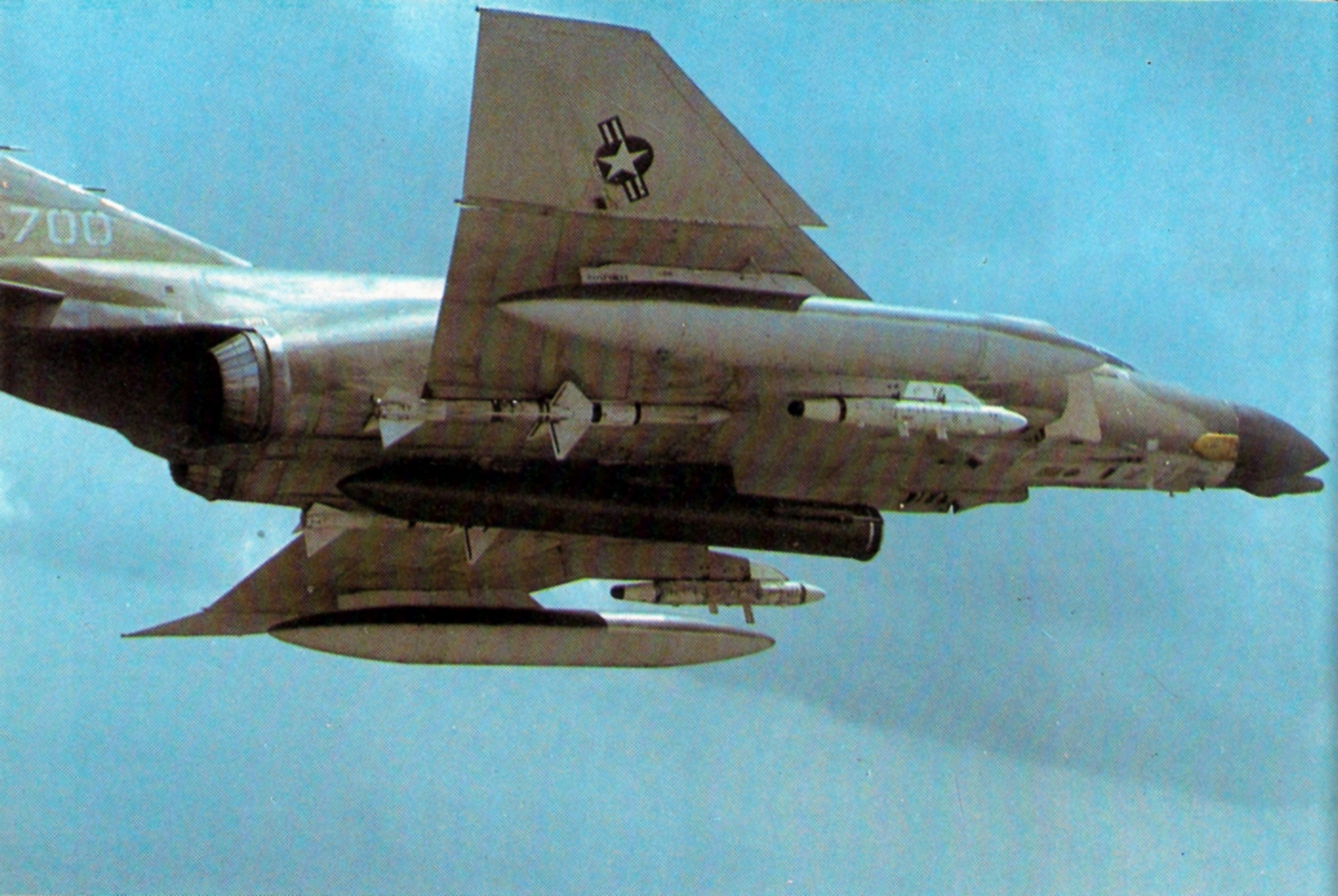
An early Pave Sword laser pod on a F-4D during the Vietnam War, 1971.

- AN/AVQ-11 Pave Sword
- AN/AVQ-14 Pave Arrow
- AN/AAS-35(V) Pave Penny

=== Laser designator pods ===
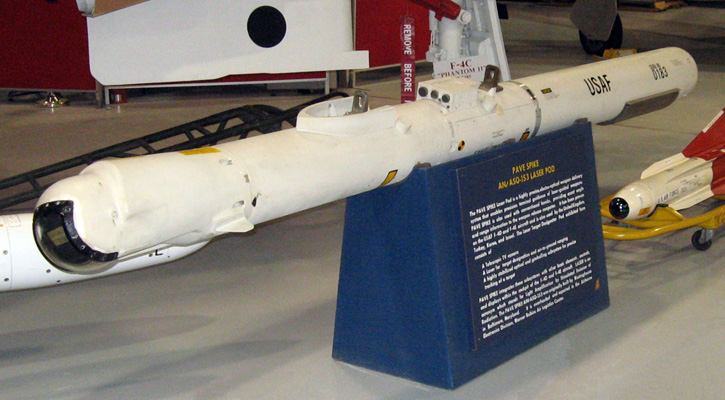
AN/ASQ-153 Pave Spike

- ATLIS
- ATLIS II
- K/PZS-01
- Loong Eye I
- Loong Eye II
- OC2
- OC5
- AN/AVQ-10 Pave Knife
- AN/AVQ-26 Pave Tack
- AN/AVQ-23 Pave Spike
- AN/ASQ-153 Pave Spike

=== FLIR pods ===
- Blue Sky navigation pod

=== FLIR and laser designator pods ===
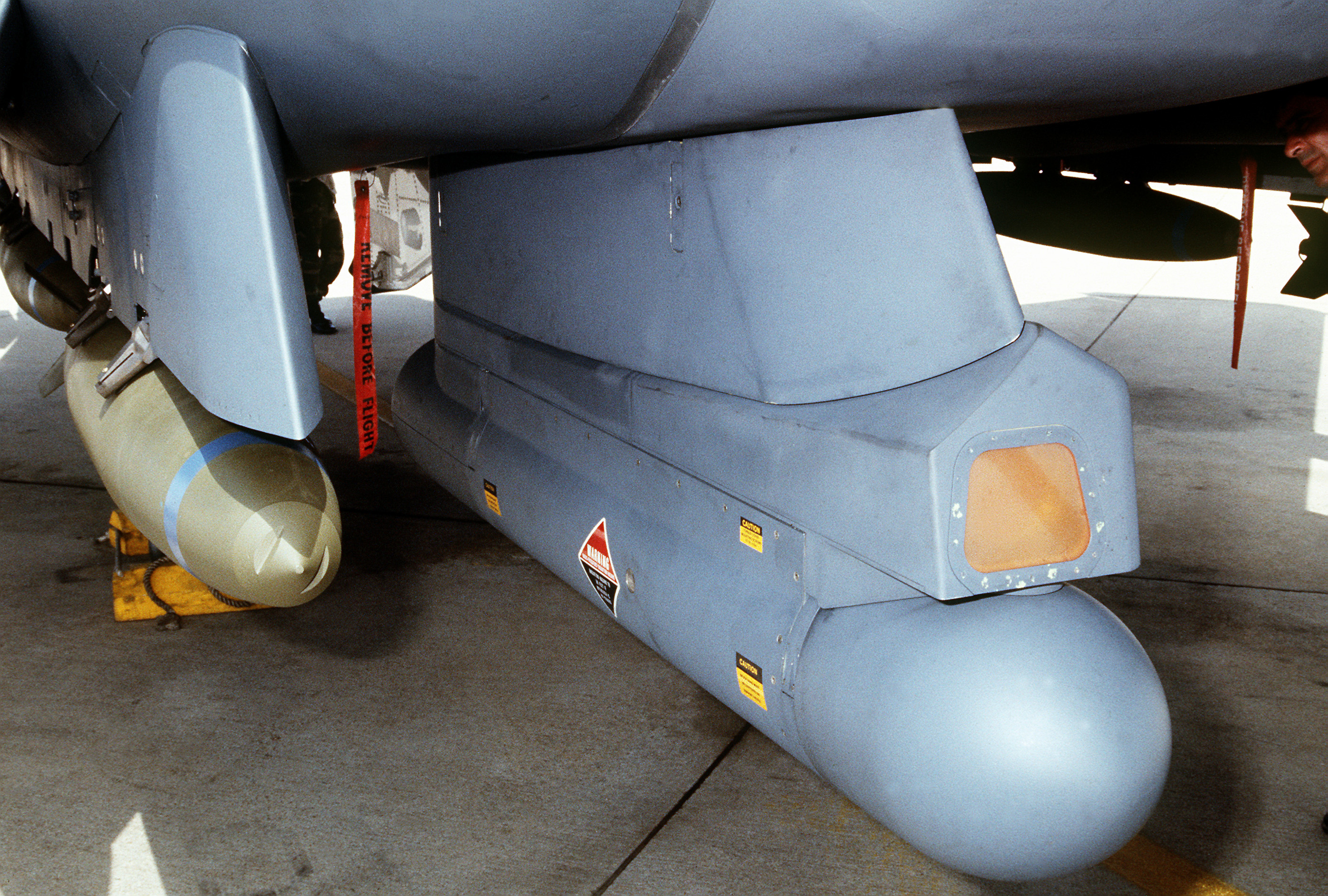
A LANTIRN pod aboard an F-15E.

- AN/ASQ-173
- AN/ASQ-228 ATFLIR
- ASELPOD
- AUEODS
- FILAT
- K/JDC-01
- AN/AAQ-14 LANTIRN
- AN/AAQ-28(V) LITENING
- AN/AAS-38 Nite Hawk
- AN/AAQ-33 Sniper XR
- AN/AVQ-26 Pave Tack
- PDLCT
- STS-55
- STS-56
- Thales Damoclès
- Thales TALIOS
- TIALD
- TX-S55
- TX-S56
- WMD-7
- UOMZ Sapsan-E
- T220/E
- YINGS-III
- T220

=== Radar homing pods ===
- AN/ASQ-213

== See also ==
- Guidance system
- Laser sight (firearms)
- List of laser articles
- List of military electronics of the United States
- AN/PEQ-1 SOFLAM
