= Laser designator =

Invisible light source to identify a target

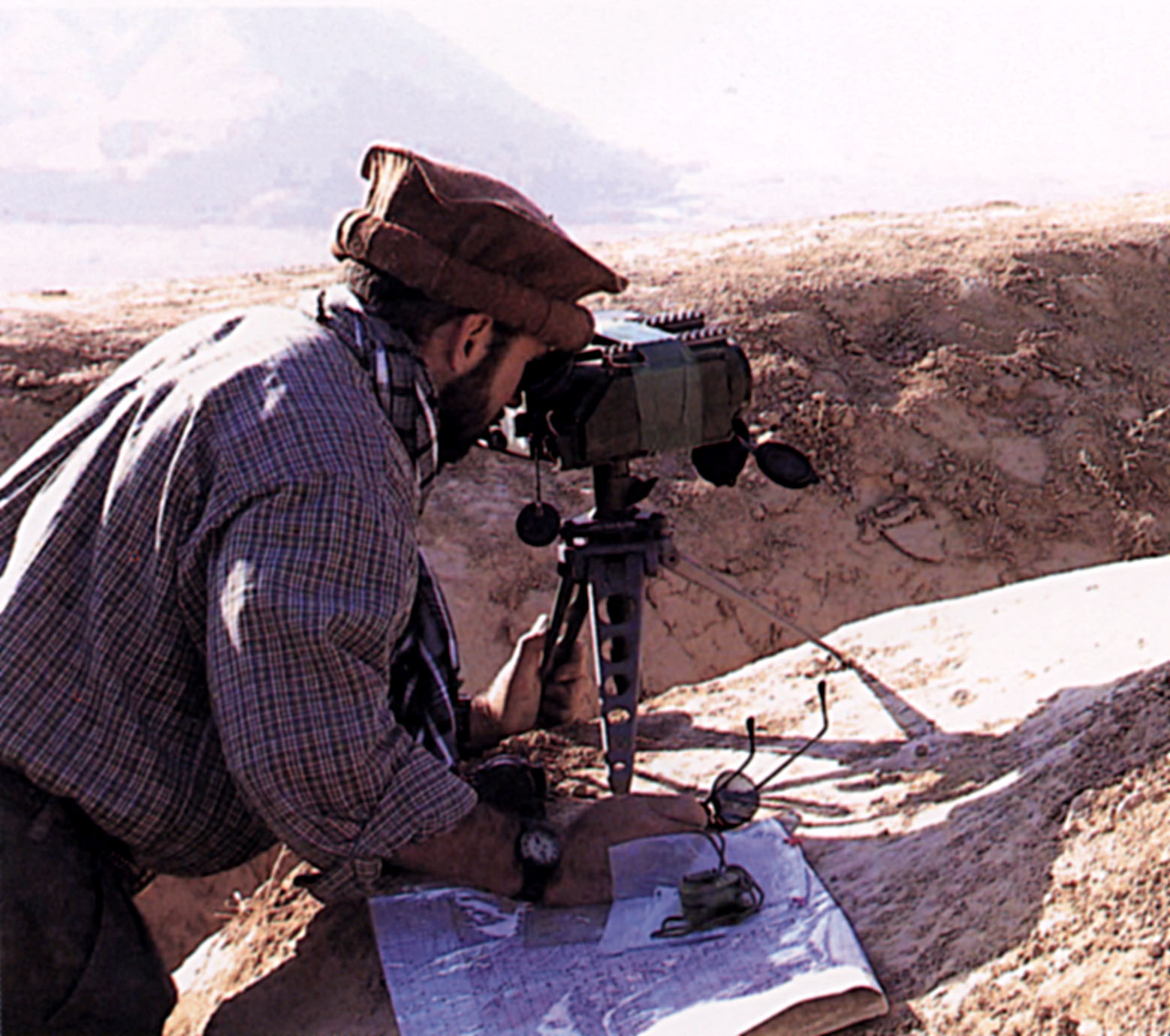
Portable unit directing bombing in Afghanistan, 2001

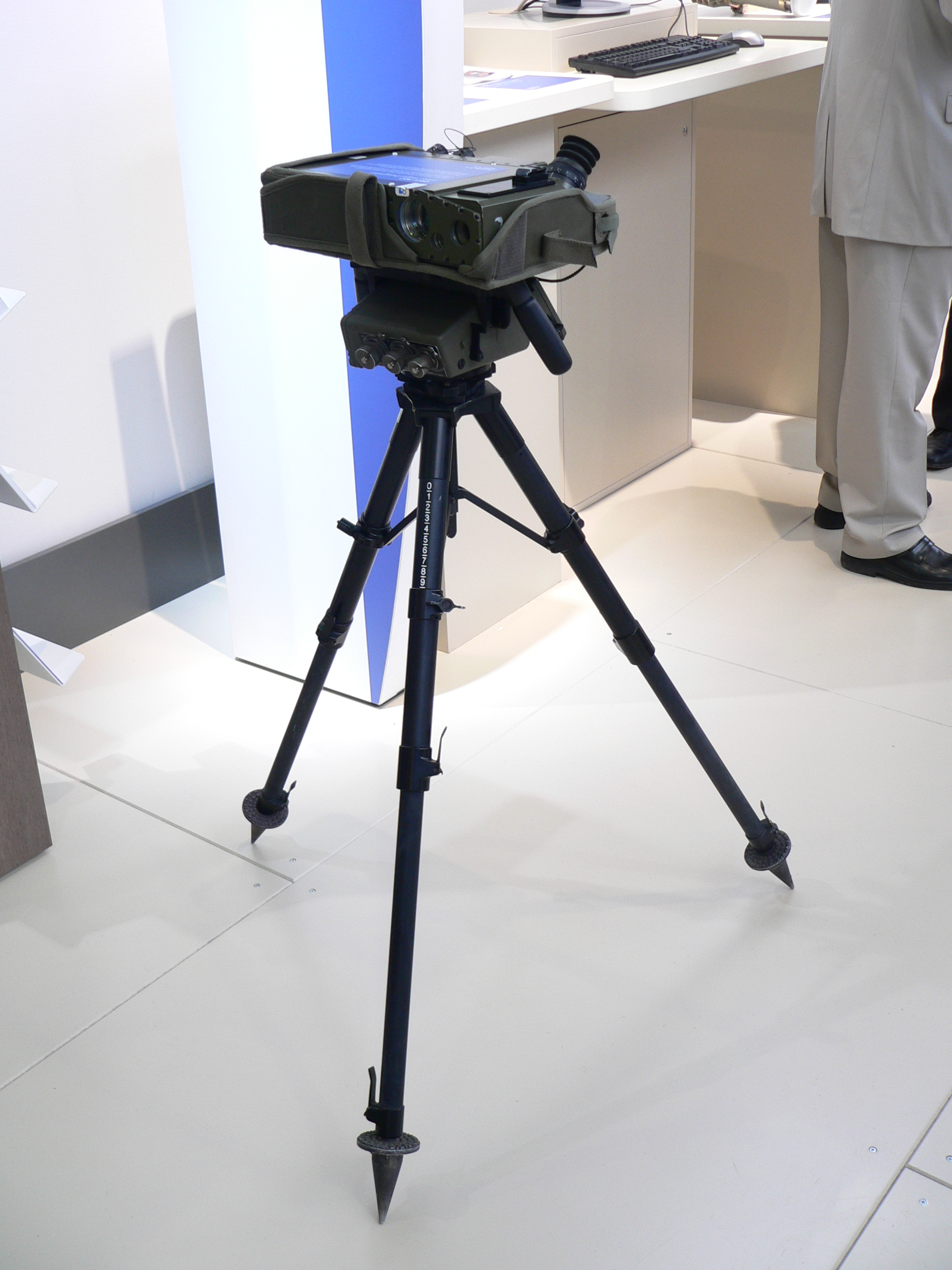
CILAS DHY 307

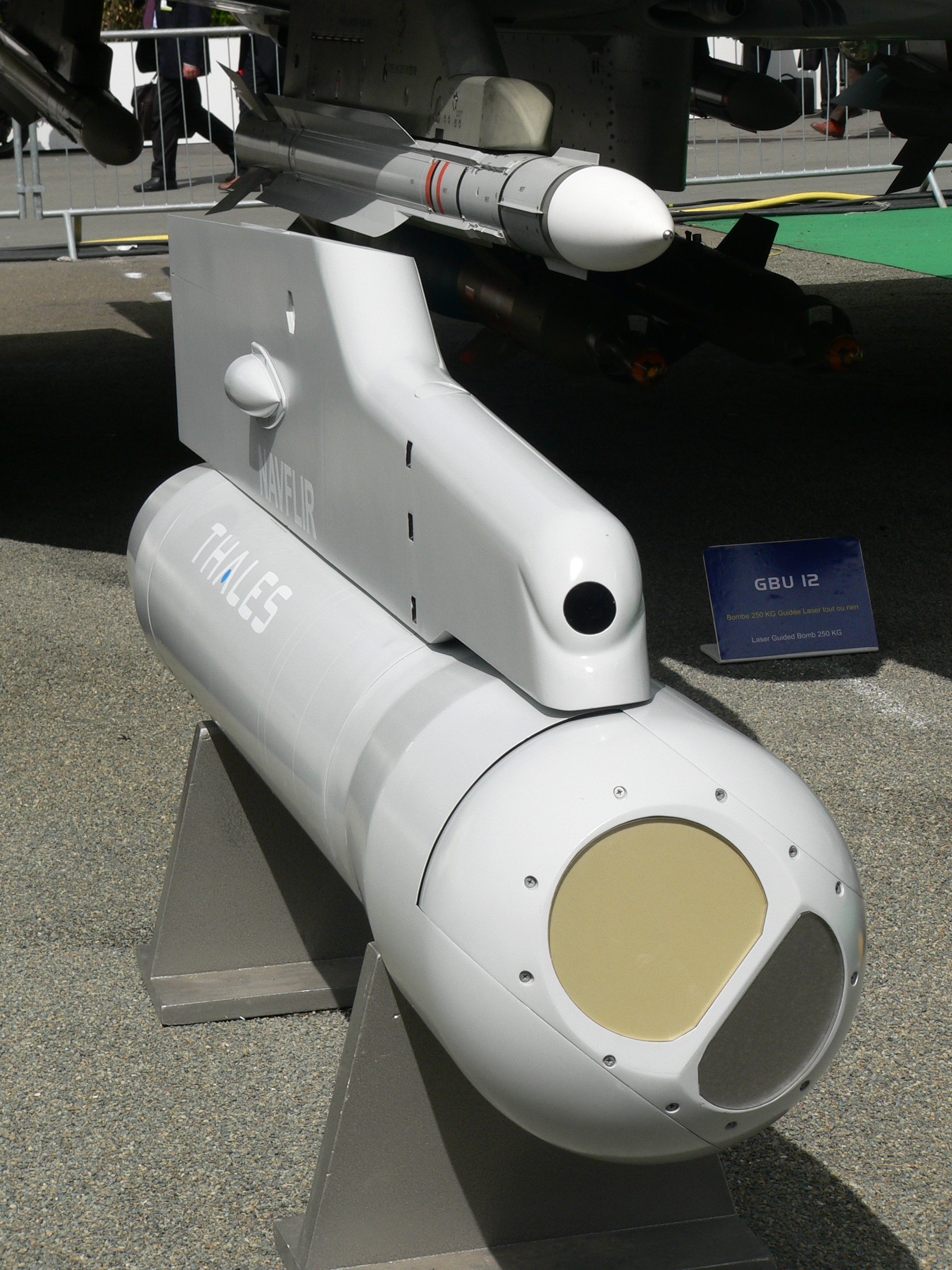
A Thales Damocles target designation pod combined with a NAVFLIR imager

A laser designator is a laser light source which is used to designate a target. Laser designators provide targeting for laser-guided bombs, missiles, or precision artillery munitions, such as the Paveway series of bombs, AGM-114 Hellfire, or the M712 Copperhead round, respectively.

When a target is marked by a designator, the beam is invisible, typically in the infrared range, and does not shine continuously. Instead, a series of coded laser pulses, also called PRF codes (pulse repetition frequency), are fired at the target. These signals are reflected off the target, and they are detected by the seeker on the laser-guided munition, which steers itself towards the centre of the reflected signal. Unless the target possesses laser detection equipment, it is extremely difficult for them to determine whether they are being marked. Laser designators work best in clear atmospheric conditions. Cloud cover, rain or smoke can make reliable designation of targets difficult or impossible unless a simulation is accessible through available ground data.

== Deployment ==
Laser designators may be mounted on aircraft, ground vehicles, naval vessels, or handheld. Depending on the wavelength of light used by the designator, the designation laser may or may not be visible to the personnel deploying it. This is the case with 1064 nm laser designators used by JTACs as that wavelength of light is difficult to see under standard Gen III/III+ night vision devices. Other imaging devices with "see-spot" capabilities to "see" the laser spot are often utilized to make sure the target is being correctly designated. These may include FLIR (forward looking infrared) thermal imagers which normally operate in the MWIR or LWIR spectrum but have a 1064 nm window in which they can see-spot the laser.

=== Airborne ===
The U.S. Air Force selected the Lockheed Martin's Sniper Advanced Targeting Pod (ATP) in 2004. It equipped multiple USAF platforms such as the F-16, F-15E, B-1, B-52, and A-10C. It also operates on multiple international fighter platforms. The U.S. Navy currently employ LITENING and ATFLIR targeting pods on a variety of strike aircraft. The Litening II is widely used by many other of the world's air forces. The United Kingdom's Royal Air Force uses the Litening III system and the French use the TALIOS (Targeting Long-range Identification Optronic System), Damocles and ATLIS II.

=== Ground-based ===
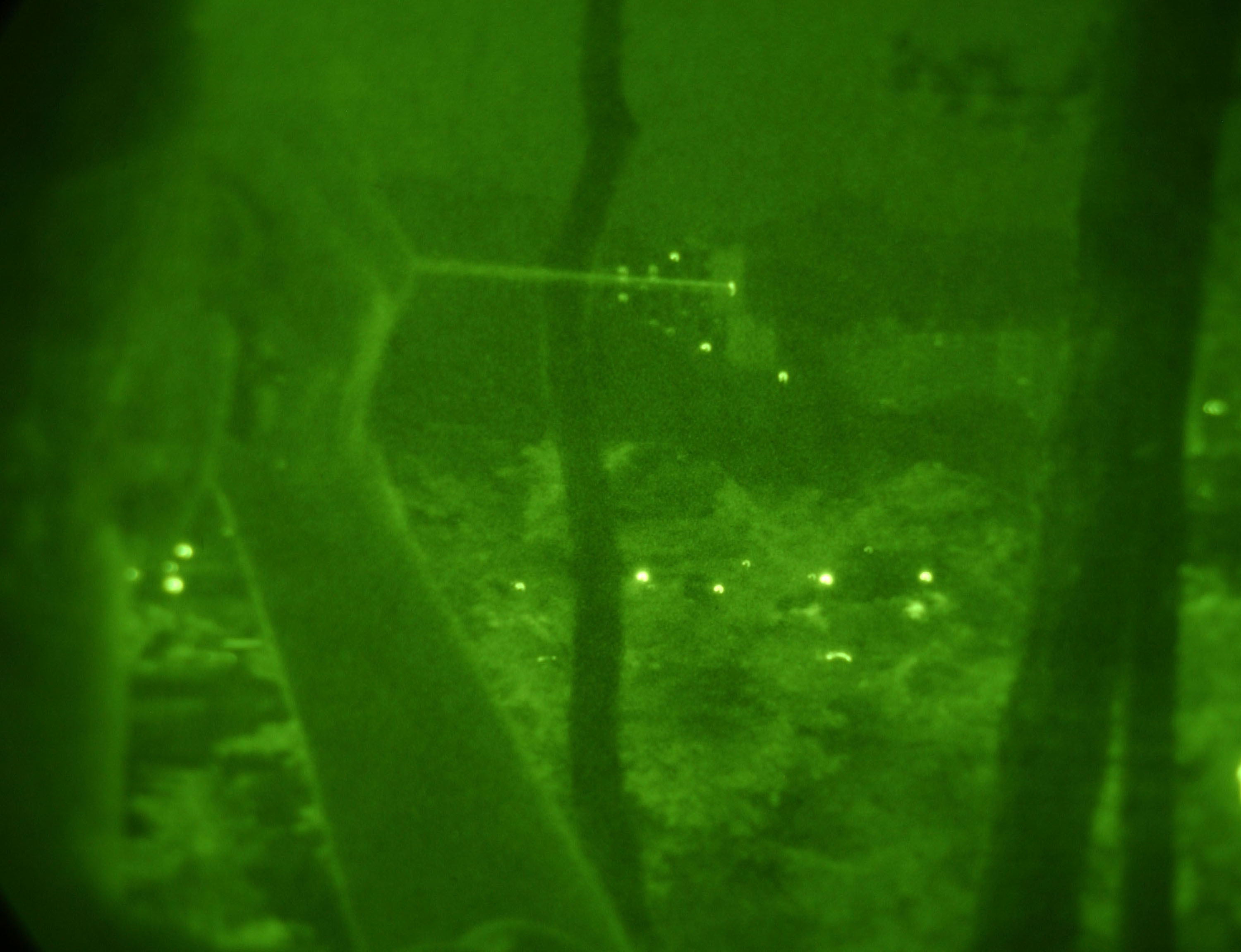
USAF handheld laser designator as seen under night vision, 2007

Many modern armed forces employ handheld laser designation systems. Examples include the AN/PEQ-1 SOFLAM of the United States, the Russian LPR series of handheld devices.

U.S. Air Force Joint Terminal Air Controllers and Marine Corps Forward Air Controllers typically employ a lightweight device, such as the AN/PED-1 Lightweight Laser Designator Rangefinder (LLDR), permitting them to designate targets for Close Air Support aircraft flying overhead and in close proximity to friendly forces. While many designators are binocular-based and may utilize tripods, smaller handheld laser designators, like the B.E. Meyers & Co. IZLID 1000P, also exist. Northrop Grumman's LLDR, using an eye-safe laser wavelength, recognizes targets, finds the range to a target, and fixes target locations for laser-guided, GPS-guided, and conventional munitions. This lightweight, interoperable system uniquely provides range finding and targeting information to other digital battlefield systems allowing the system to provide targeting information for non-guided munitions, or when laser designation is unreliable due to battlefield conditions.

== Gallery ==
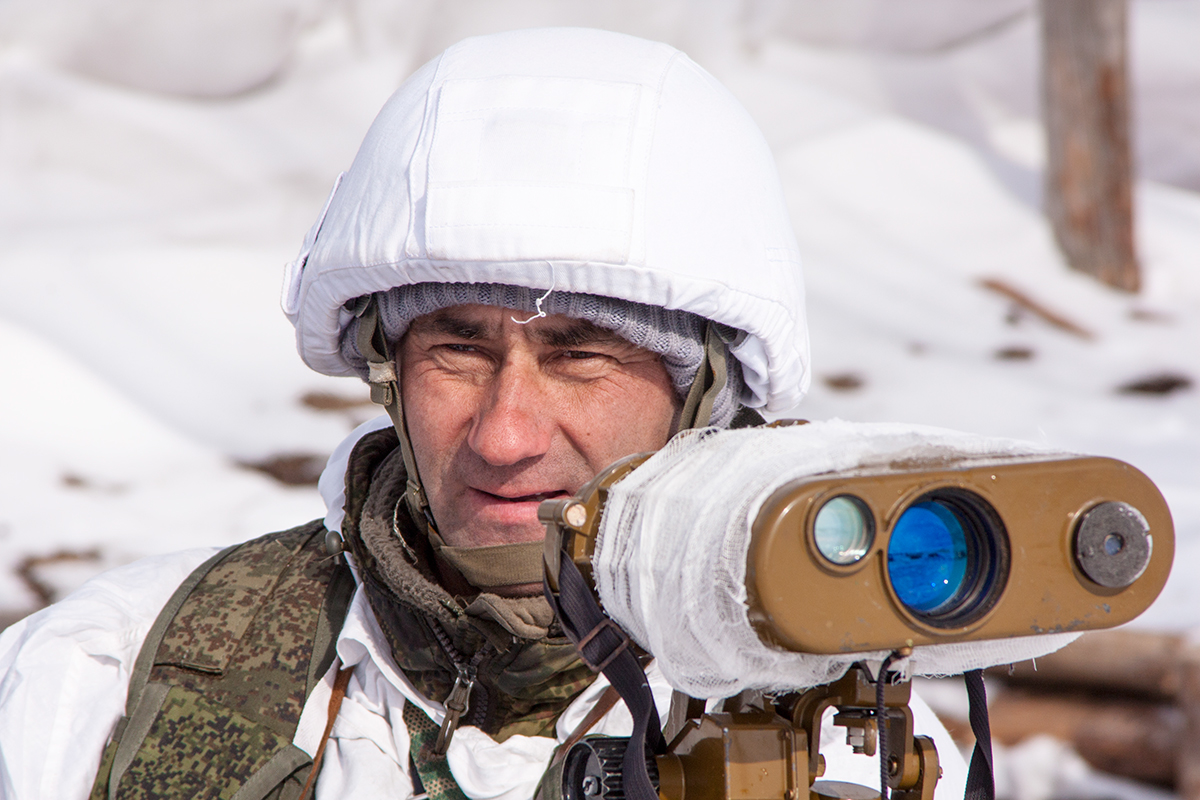
The Soviet-era LPR-1 laser designator.

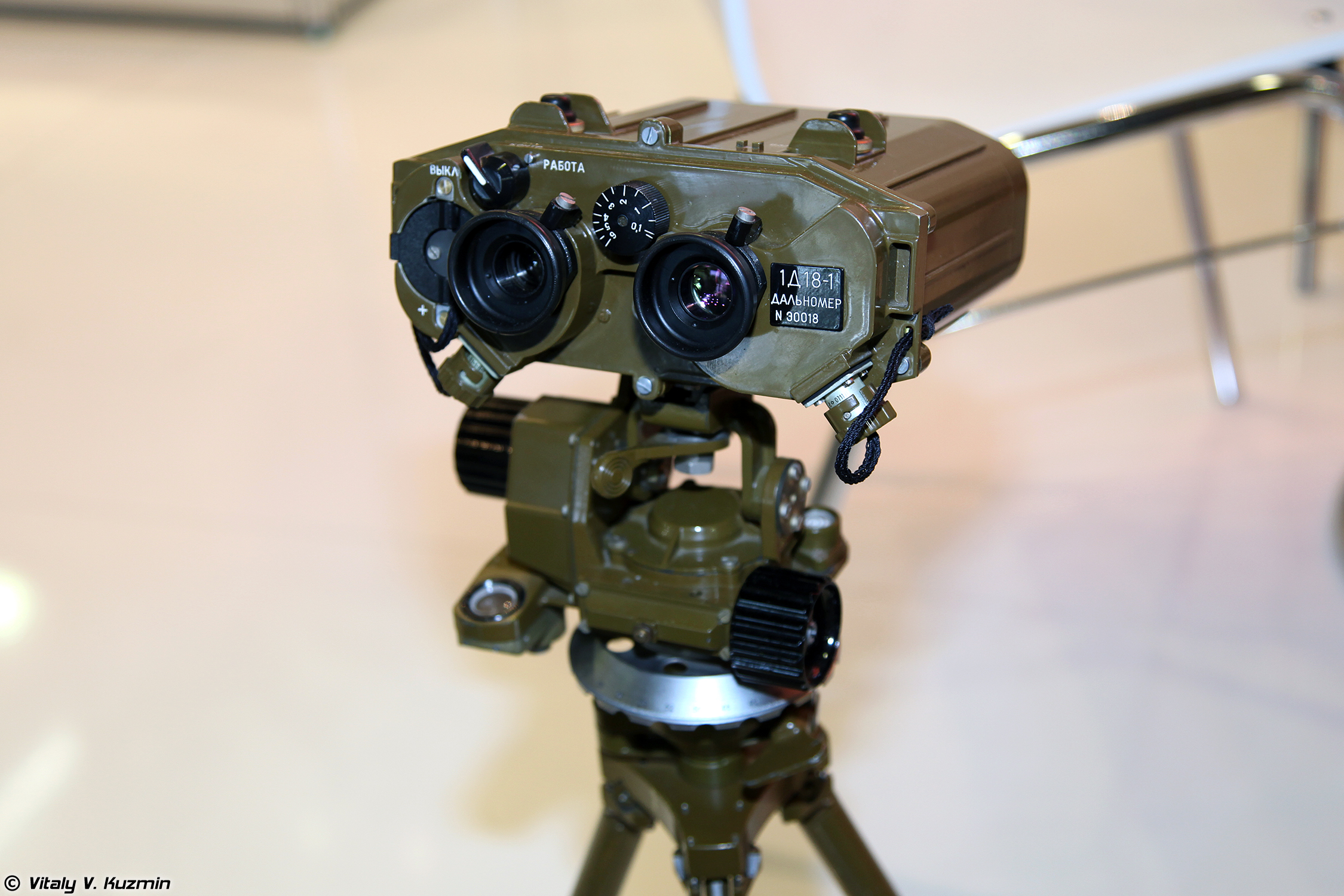
The LPR-2 laser designator.

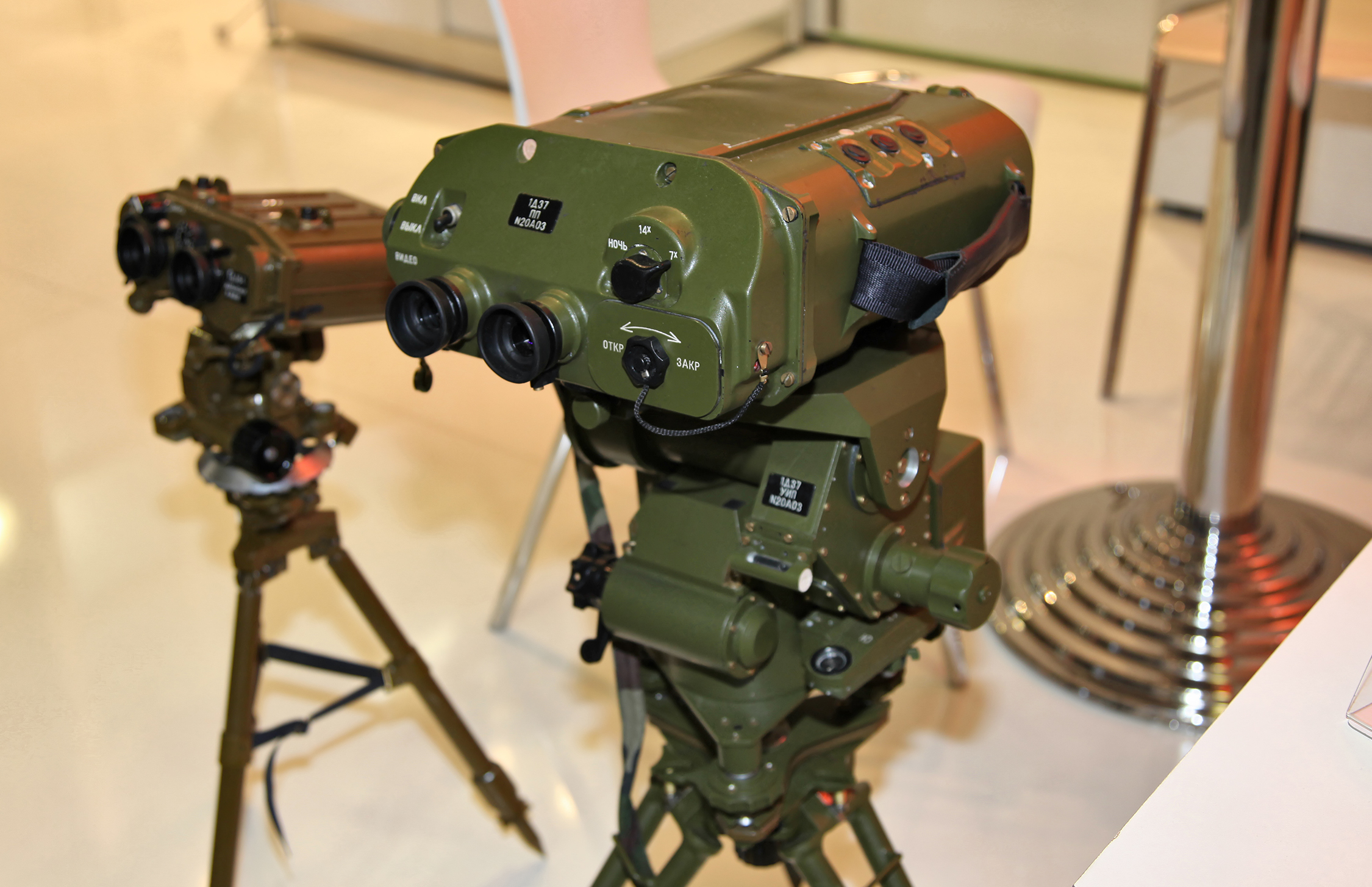
The LPR-4 laser designator.

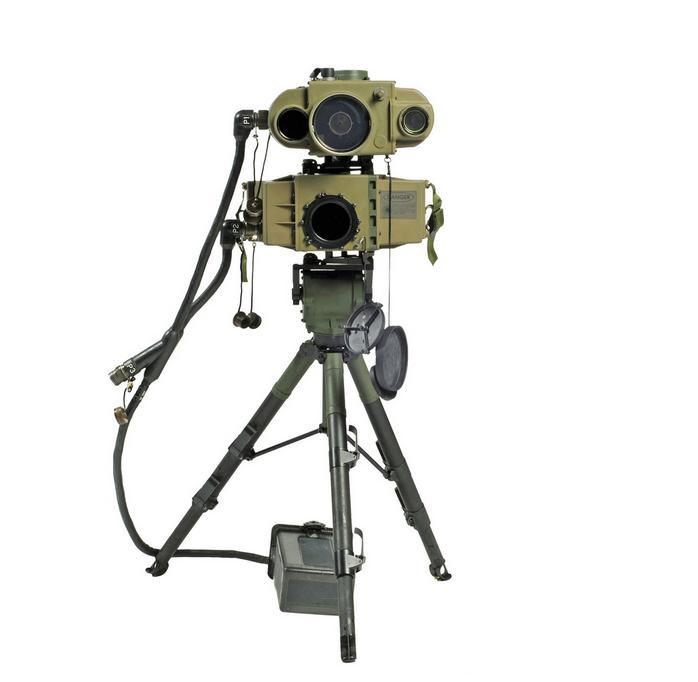
The Lightweight Laser Designator Rangefinder.

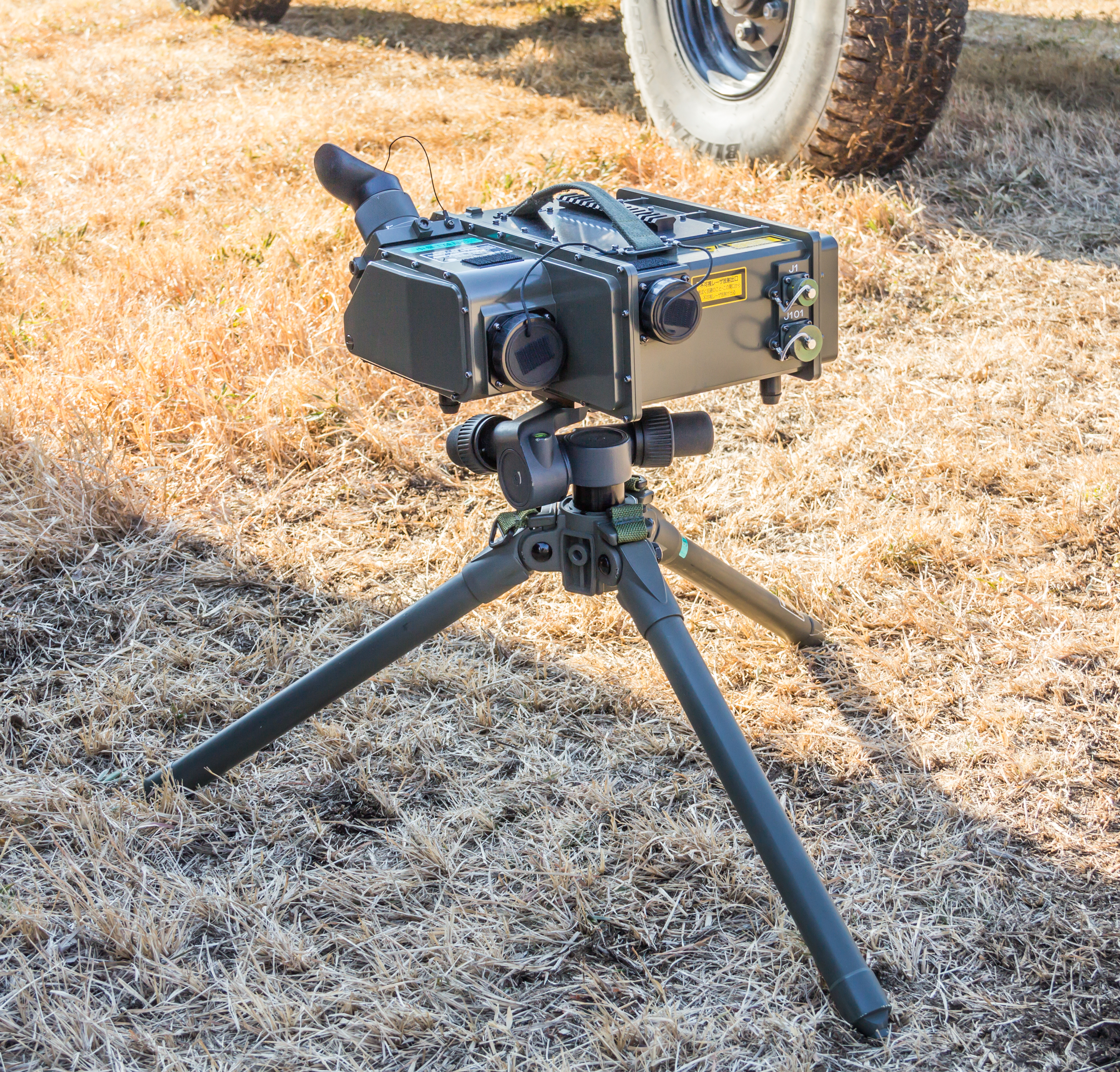
JGSDF Middle range Multi-Purpose missile laser designator.

== See also ==
- Guidance system
- Laser sight
- List of laser articles
- List of military electronics of the United States
- Targeting pods
- AN/PEQ-1 SOFLAM
