= PDLCT =

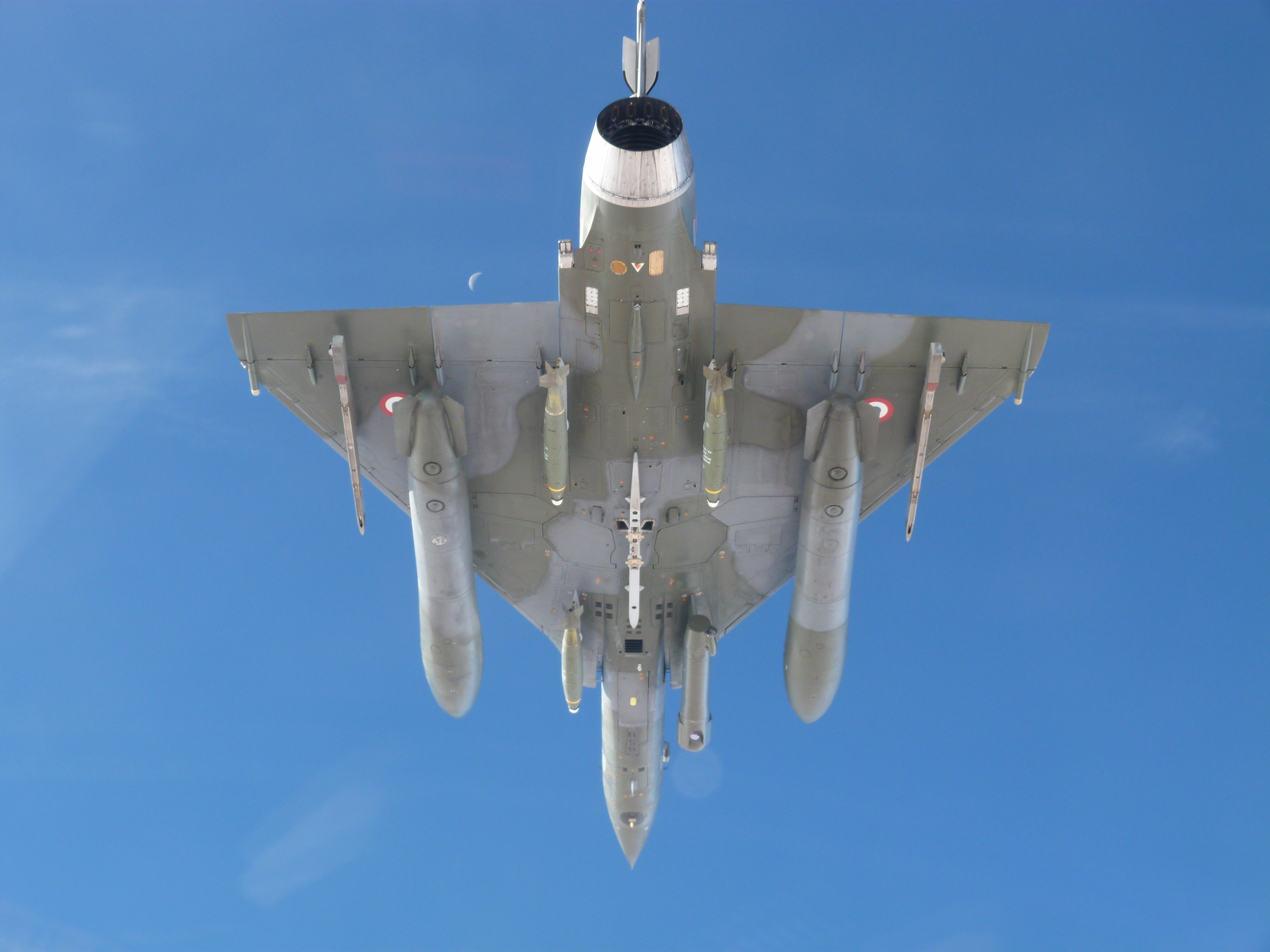
One French Mirage 2000D with 3 bombs Mk 82 Airburst, one PDLCT, two fuel tanks.

The PDLCT (for Pod de désignation laser caméra thermique, "thermic camera-mounted laser designation pod") is a French targeting pod build for Thomson-CSF used on Mirage 2000D, notably. They are being superseded by the Damocles (targeting pod).
