= Damocles (targeting pod) =

French military equipment

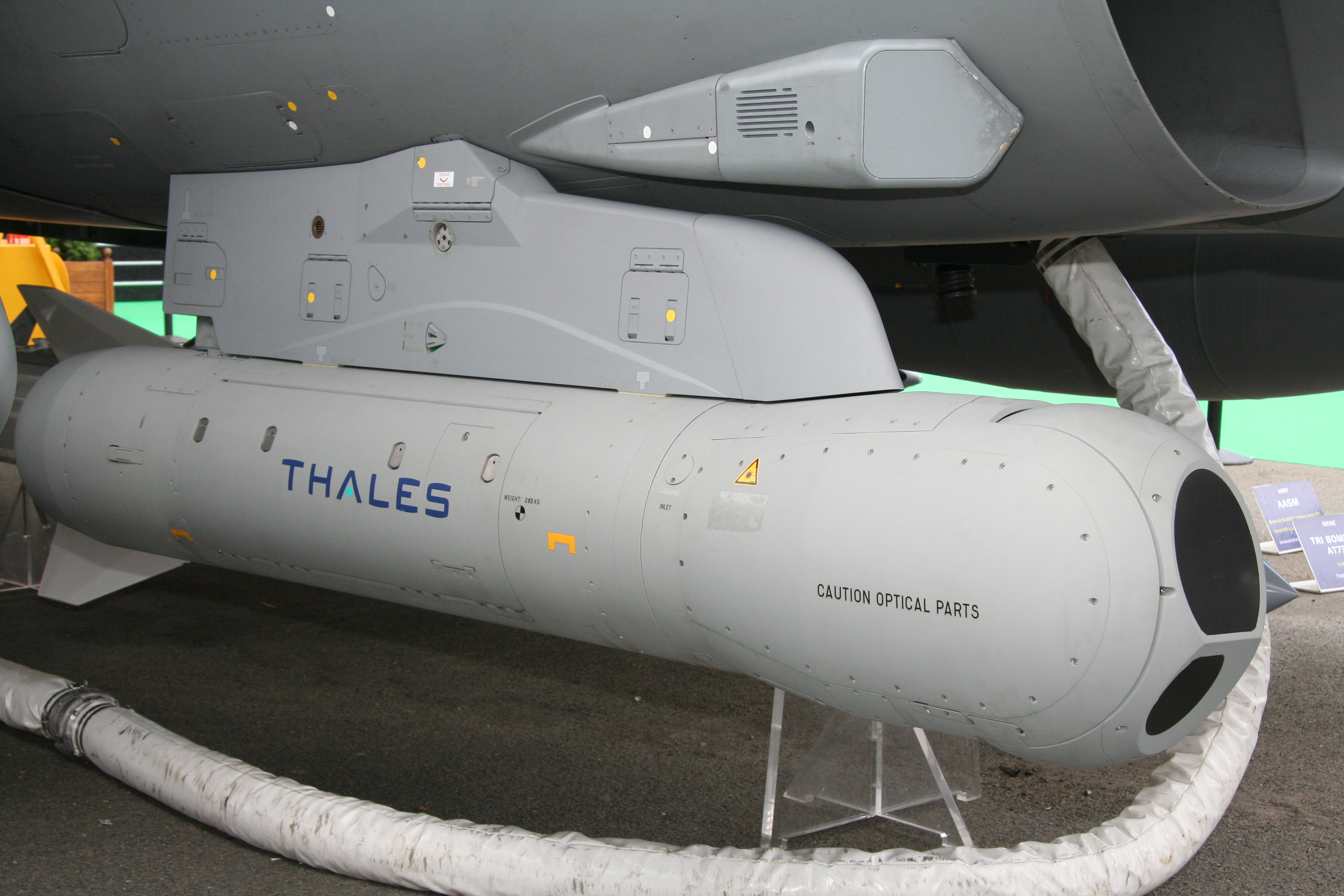
A Damocles pod on a Dassault Rafale at the Paris Air Show 2009

The Damocles is a 3rd generation targeting pod, modular, eye-safe laser, high performance pod selected by the French Air Force for its attack fighter aircraft fleet. It first entered service in 2009.

Damocles is made by Thales Group produced in Élancourt, France.

== Features ==
Damocles features a long-range laser designator, an integrated navigation FLIR and high-resolution imagery, and is fully compatible with Paveway and BGL laser-guided bombs, imagery-guided weapons, and AASM GPS/INS/LASER-guided weapons.

It also features a reconnaissance capability with instant transmission of imagery to ground stations. Overall robustness and ease of maintenance have been improved.

It is capable of guiding laser weapons to their extreme range (16 km) and identifying armoured vehicle targets at 27 km also conducting post-strike analysis at the same range.

== Exports ==
Export sales of the Damocles targeting pod include:

- Malaysia, which operates Sukhoi Su-30MKM fighters
- the United Arab Emirates, which flies the Mirage 2000-9 from Dassault Aviation
- Saudi Arabia, which has a mixed fleet of British and American planes. The Royal Saudi Air Force is flying the Damocles on its Tornado and Typhoon aircraft.

In 2008 it was suggested that Russia would license-produce the Thales Damocles reconnaissance and target designation pod for its air force strike aircraft, following successful tests of the system with Malaysia's Sukhoi Su-30MKM multirole fighter. Comparative trials involving Damocles and the Ural Optical and Mechanical Plant (UOMZ)-produced Sapsan and Solux targeting pods went in favour of the French design.

=== Current operators ===
- France - Rafale & Mirage 2000D
- Malaysia - Sukhoi Su-30MKM
- Morocco - Mirage F1CM VI/EM VI
- Saudi Arabia - Tornado GR4 & Eurofighter Typhoon
- United Arab Emirates - Mirage 2000-9
