= GBU-12 Paveway II =

- GBU-12 Paveway II
- Type: Unpowered laser guided bomb
- Place of origin: United States

Service history
- In service: 1976 - Present
- Wars: Persian Gulf War; War in Afghanistan (2001–2021); Iraq War

Production history
- Manufacturer: Lockheed Martin
- Unit cost: US $21,896

Specifications
- Mass: 230 kg (510 lb)
- Length: 3.27 m (10.7 ft)
- Diameter: 273 mm (10.7 in)
- Effective firing range: 14.8 km (9.2 mi)

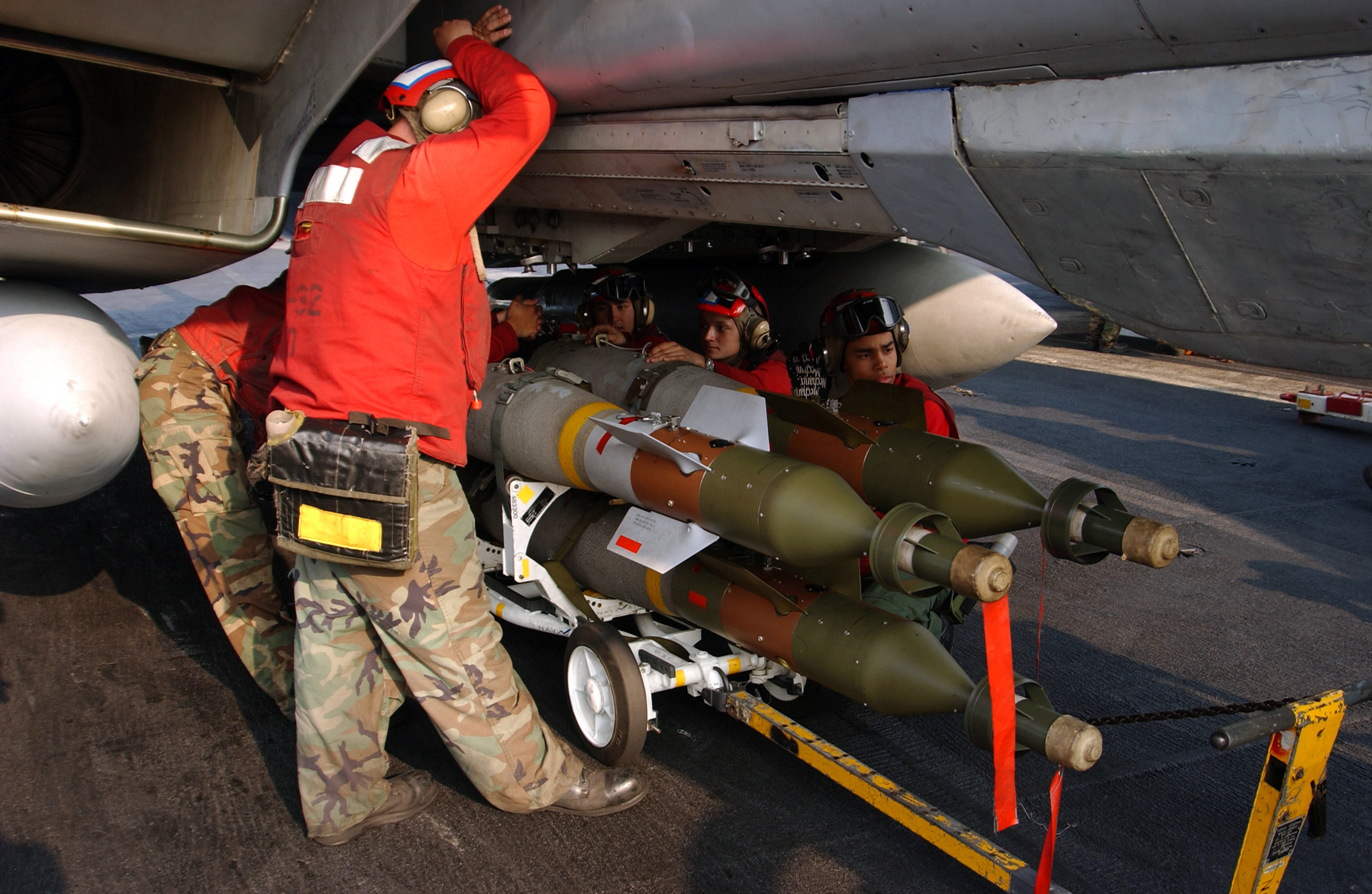
U.S. Navy crewmen loading GBU-12s onto an F-14

The GBU-12 Paveway II is an American aerial laser-guided bomb, based on the Mk 82 500 lb (230 kg) general-purpose bomb, but with the addition of a nose-mounted laser seeker and fins for guidance. As a member of the Paveway series of weapons, the Paveway II entered into service c. 1976. It is currently in service with the U.S. Air Force, U.S. Navy, U.S. Marine Corps, and various other air forces.

== Development and deployment ==
The development of the GBU-12 traces back to the Vietnam War. The U.S. Air Force wanted a greater variety of laser-guided bombs, especially a lighter and more maneuverable one to be able to hit moving targets on the Ho Chi Minh trail. Earlier designs of guided bombs such as the BOLT-117 were quickly superseded by the Paveway series of add-on kits for conventional bombs.

GBU-12 bombs entered service in 1976 and are produced (along with the balance of the Paveway series) by defense contractors Lockheed Martin and Raytheon. Raytheon began production after purchasing the product line from Texas Instruments. Lockheed Martin was awarded a contract to compete with Raytheon when there was a break in production caused by transferring manufacturing out of Texas. "Paveway II" refers specifically to the guidance kit, rather than to the weapon itself.

In 2017, Lockheed Martin secured a $22m contract from the US Air Force to deliver tail kits and laser guidance kits for the GBU-12 configured LGBs, in December 2017. Deliveries are expected to commence in the final quarter of 2019.

The GBU-12 has been used in numerous conflicts such as the Gulf War; F-111s destroyed 920 Iraqi tanks and APCs with GBU-12s. It is among the most commonly used guided munitions, and as such is able to be dropped from a very wide variety of aircraft, such as the F-111, B-52, A-10, F-15E, F/A-18, B-1B, F-16C/D, and F-35 (GBU-49).

=== Guidance ===
The US Department of Defense has upgraded GBU-12 production versions to include GPS guidance modes. Lockheed Martin is the sole source for US Navy purchases of this version. Raytheon sells upgraded GBU-12s to the US Government and 23 other nations. Laser-guided bombs are often labeled "smart bombs" because they are able to follow a non-ballistic trajectory when laser designation of the intended target is undertaken. According to Raytheon's fact sheet for the Paveway II, 99 deliveries of guided munitions will yield a circular error probable (CEP) of only 3.6 feet (1.1 m), versus a CEP of 310 feet (94 m) for 99 unguided bombs dropped under similar conditions.

Paveway II laser-guided bombs use what is known as "bang bang" guidance. This means the bomb's fins deflect fully, rather than proportionally when attempting to guide to the laser spot. For example, if the laser spotting determines that change need to be made, the fins deflect until over-correction and then deflect back in the opposite direction, creating a sinusoidal type of flight path. This type of guidance may be less efficient at times, however is more cost-effective and allows the use of simpler electronics in the guidance system.

== Operators ==
- Australia
- Canada
- Croatia
- France
- Greece
- Malaysia
- Pakistan
- Philippines
- Romania
- Slovakia
- South Korea
- Taiwan
- Thailand
- Turkey
- United States
