= Bombe Guidée Laser =

French Laser guided bomb

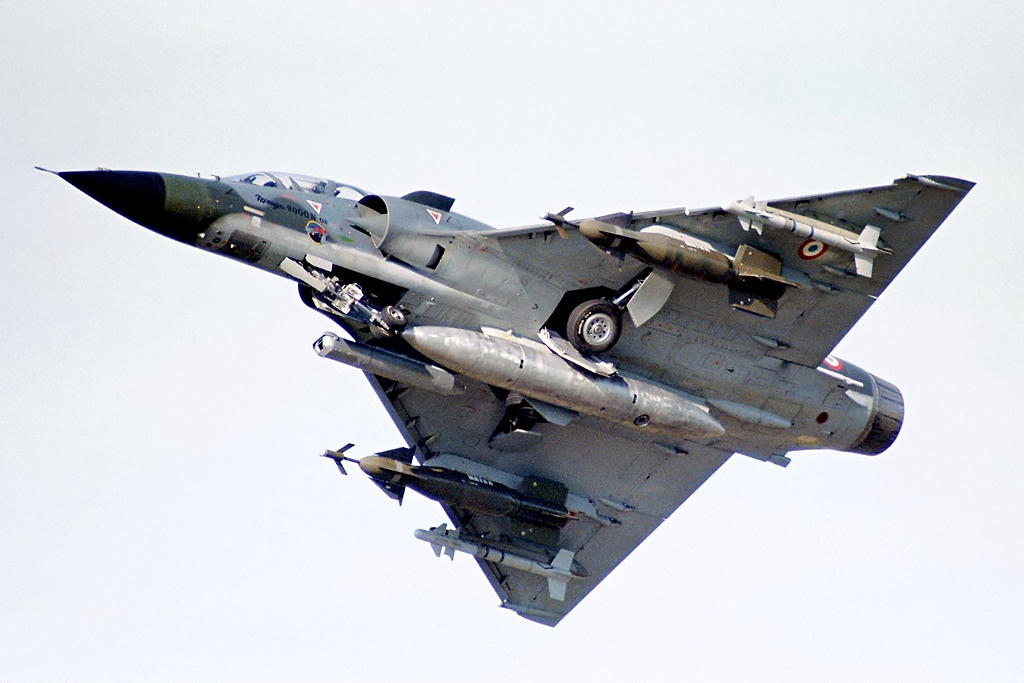
A French Dassault Mirage 2000N with two BGL LGB

Bombe Guidée Laser (BGL) laser-guided bombs were developed by the French industrial conglomerate Matra (now MBDA) starting in 1978.

== Description ==
The guidance system had to work using the same principles as the US Paveway guided bombs. The guidance kits were intended as modifications to existing free fall bombs that were in service with the French Air and Space Force. The semi active laser homing (SALH) guidance system was developed starting from the AS-30 laser-guided missile sensor. The guidance system allowed for in-flight target illumination by the aircraft-mounted ATLIS II (Automatic Tracking Laser Illumination System) or with ground-based laser designator targeting pod.

The BGL targeting system are attached to 250, 400 and 1,000 kg free-fall general-purpose bombs. The French Air and Space Force discontinued the purchases due to the higher cost compared to the US Paveway family bombs that were adopted as an interim solution while waiting for the French-made AASM family of guided bombs to enter service.

== Operational use ==
The BGLs were combat-proven over Bosnia in 1994–1995 and in the Kosovo conflict in Spring 1999. Several BGL Arcole 1000kg were also exported to India for use on their Mirage 2000Hs and saw combat in the Kargil War.

== Variants ==
The BGL series of bombs includes:

- BGL-250 – 250 kg bomb
- BGL-400 – 400 kg bomb
- BGL-1000 – 1,000 kg bomb

== Operators ==
- France
- India

== See also ==
- Paveway Family
- Sudarshan LGB
- Laser Guided Bombs
