= M117 bomb =

Free-fall demolition bomb

M117
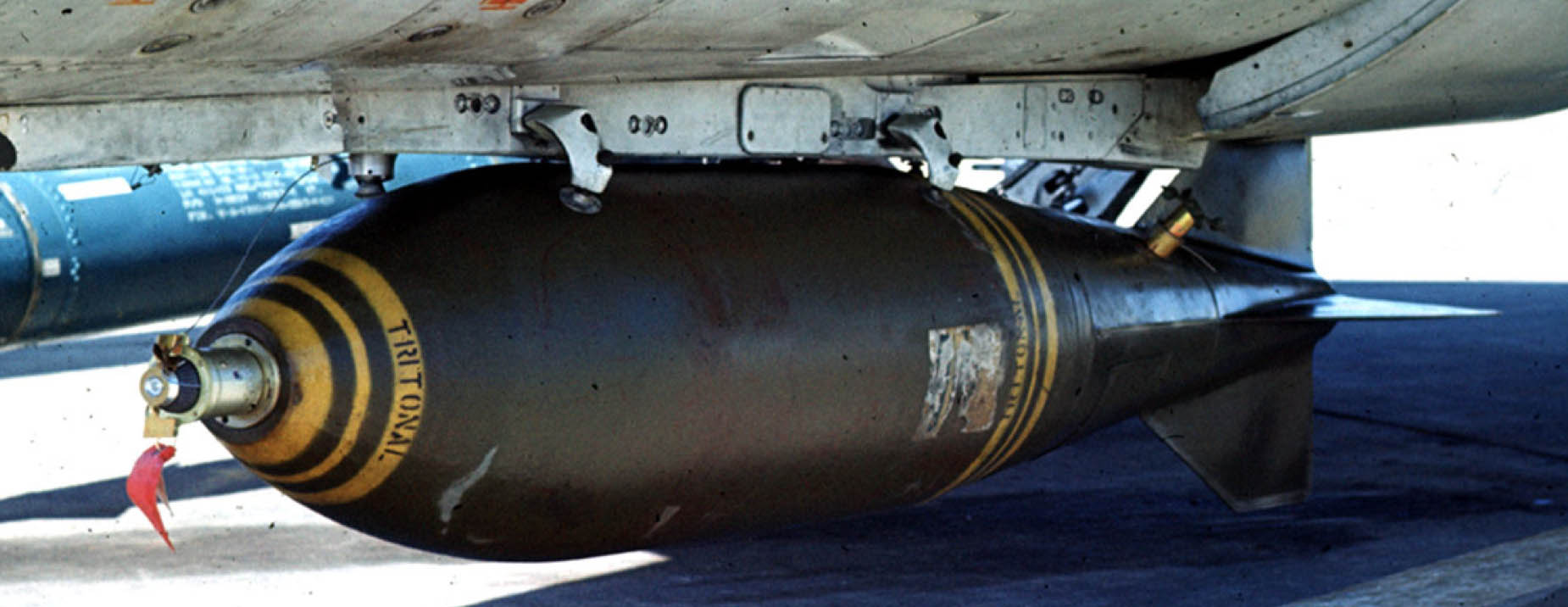
- Type: Free-fall demolition bomb
- Place of origin: United States

Service history
- In service: 1950s–2015
- Used by: United States; Indonesia; Israel
- Wars: Korean War; Vietnam War; Operation Desert Storm; Gaza war

Production history
- Variants: M117A1, M117A1E2, M117D, M117R

Specifications
- Mass: 340 kg
- Length: 2.06 m-2.16 m
- Diameter: 408 mm
- Wingspan: 520 mm
- Maximum firing range: Air Dropped
- Warhead: Tritonal or Minol
- Warhead weight: 171 - 183 Kg
- Guidance system: none, free-fall

The M117 is an air-dropped demolition bomb used by United States military forces. The weapon dates back to the Korean War of the early 1950s. Although it has a nominal weight of 750 pounds (340 kg), its actual weight can be around 820 pounds (372 kg), depending on fuze and retardation options. The bomb's explosive content is typically 386 pounds (175 kg) of Tritonal or 377 pounds (171 kg) of Minol in the case of the M117A1E2, due to their higher density and detonation velocity compared to TNT.

Demolition bombs rely on time delayed fuzes which allow the bomb to burrow into a building or other structure before detonating. The M117 can be configured with a conical low-drag tail for medium and high altitude deliveries or a high-drag tail fin for low-altitude drops, delaying the bombs hitting their targets ensuring bombers are out of the blast zone before detonation. The M117 was the basis for the BOLT-117, the world's first laser-guided bomb.

== History and use ==
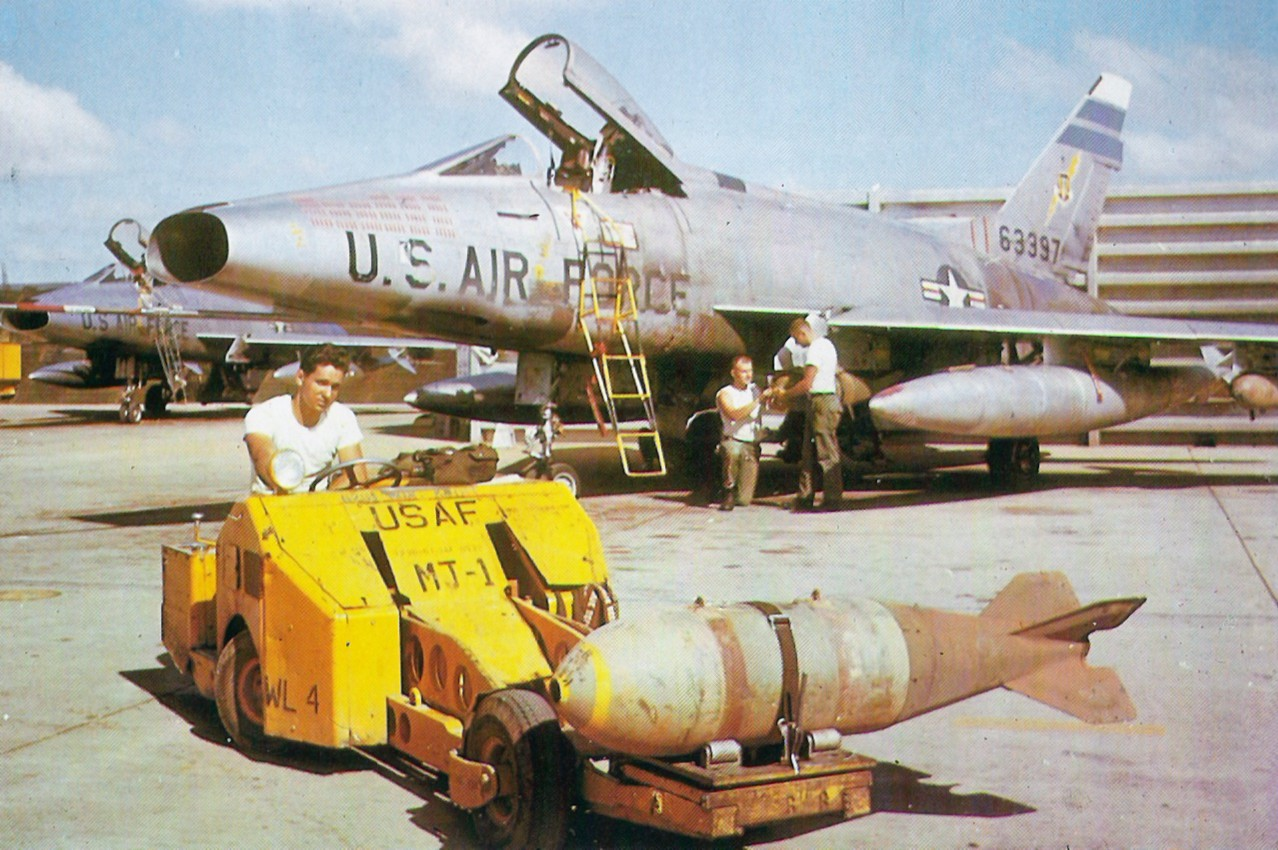
An F-100D of the 308th TFS, being loaded with Mk 117 750 lb bombs at Tuy Hoa, South Vietnam, in early 1966

From the 1950s through the early 1970s the M117 was a standard aircraft weapon, carried by the F-100 Super Sabre, F-104 Starfighter, F-105 Thunderchief, B-57 Canberra, F-111, F-5, A-1 Skyraider, A-4 Skyhawk, and F-4 Phantom. The M117 series was used extensively during the Vietnam War, and B-52G Stratofortress aircraft dropped 44,600 M117 and M117R bombs during Operation Desert Storm.

The B-52 Stratofortress was the last American aircraft to use the bomb; tactical aircraft had mostly switched to using the Mark 80-series bombs, particularly the Mark 82 (500 pounds (227 kg)) or Mark 84 (2,000 pounds (907 kg)) bombs and their guided equivalents. On 26 June 2015, the last Mk 117 in PACAF inventory was dropped by a B-52H crew on an island near Andersen AFB, Guam.

During the Iran-Iraq War, the Iranian Air Force modified the MIM-23 Hawk missiles with M117 bombs for its warheads due to a shortage of AGM-65 Maverick missiles.

In October 2023, during the Gaza war, the Israeli Air Force released images and footage showing F-16Is armed with M117 bombs, with a description suggesting that M117 bombs were used in airstrikes in the Gaza Strip. The bombs appear to be unguided, as there are no visible GPS-guided JDAM kits or laser-guidance kits installed.

== Variants ==
M117A1

- The M117A1 is essentially the same bomb as the M117 with the exception of the following components which have been removed: center lug, two spring washers utilized to hold the electrical fuzes in the nose and base and a ring receptacle lock utilized in the electrical fuze cable assembly.

M117A1E1

M117A1E2

- The M117A1E2 is identical to the M117A1 with the exception that the explosive filler Minol II (377 pounds (171 kg)) is used instead of Tritonal. Minol II was used in an effort to offset the shortages of TNT in the late 1960s, however, problems developed during the storage of M117 bombs filled with Minol II, especially in hot, tropical areas which caused the explosive filler to expand and ooze or extrude through the joints of the bomb. While determined safe to handle, the extruded material required maintainers to clean the bombs before transportation or usage. The U.S. Navy refused to use M117 bombs with the Minol II filler citing, "Because of the proximity of crew quarters to the ships’ magazines where explosives are stored and the necessity of handling ordnance on rolling and pitching vessels, the Navy has regarded Minol II as being a potential hazard to the safety of its ships ’ crews and thus has not approved its use aboard ship."

M117A1E3

M117A2

M117A3

M117D

- "The M117D (D – Destructor) looks similar to the M117R but uses a magnetic influence fuze, which enables the bomb to function as a mine. The M117D is released in a high-drag configuration for a ground implant or shallow water mining. It detonates when an object passing near the bomb triggers the fuze."

M117R

- The M117R (R – Retarded) uses a special fin assembly providing either high-drag or low-drag release options. For low altitude deliveries, the tail assembly opens four large drag plates which rapidly slow the bomb and allow the aircraft to escape its blast.

MC-1

- The M117 was the basis of the MC-1 chemical warfare bomb, which had the body cavity filled with sarin nerve gas. The MC-1 was never used by the U.S. in combat and was eliminated from the U.S. stockpile in June 2006.

== Tail Assemblies ==
BSU-85/B

- Air-inflatable retarder

BSU-93/B

- Air-inflatable retarder

M131/M131A1

- Early low-drag conical tail assembly utilized for high-altitude bomb drops.

MAU-91A/B

- High-drag tail assembly utilized to drastically reduce the free-fall speed of the M117 and when utilized in low-level bombing, allowed bomber aircraft sufficient time to exit the blast area before bomb detonation. M117 bombs utilizing this style tail assembly were designated M117R.

MAU-103A/B

- Low-drag conical tail assembly which began service with the M117 in the 1970s.

== Gallery ==
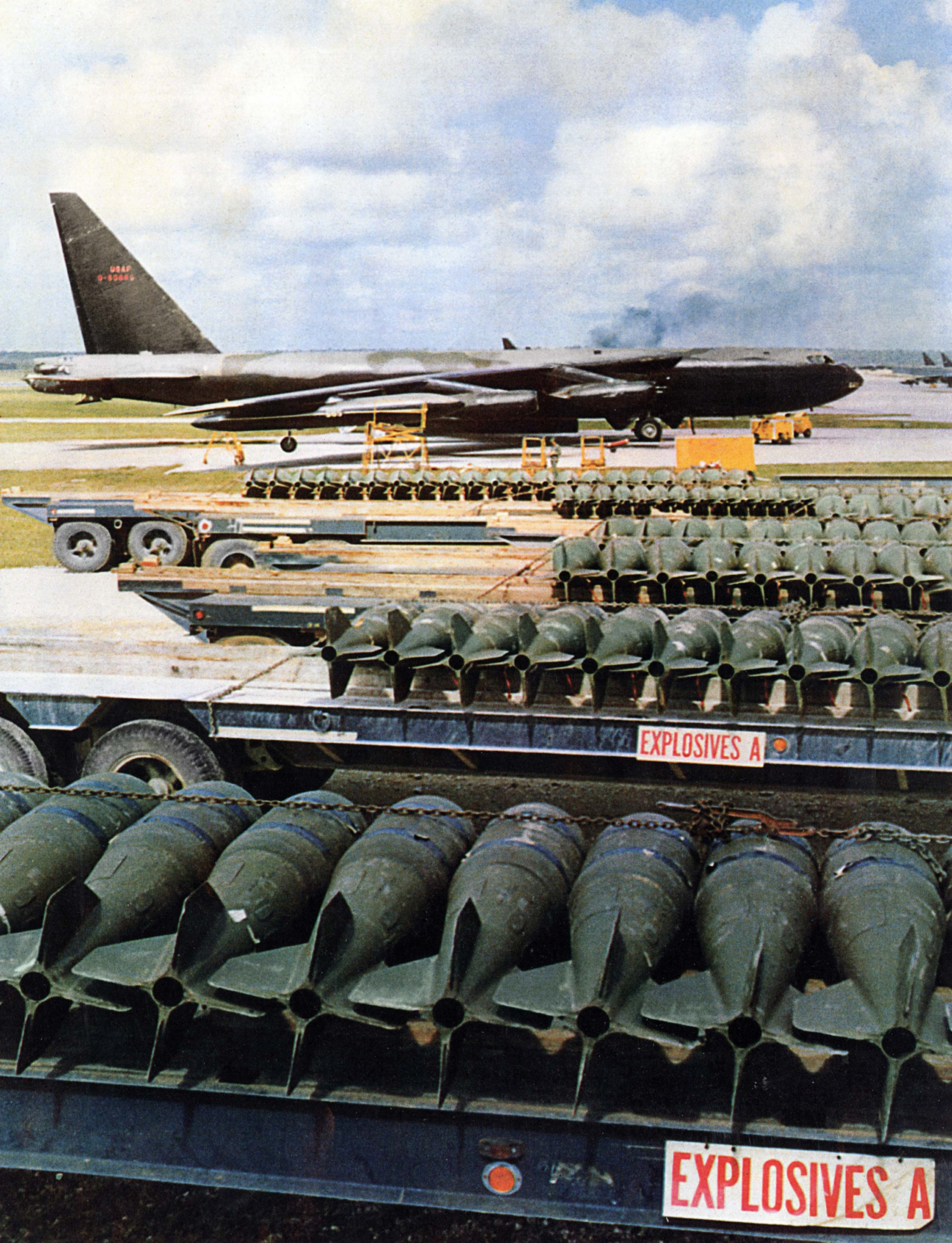
M-117 bomb-rack, with Boeing B-52 in the background.

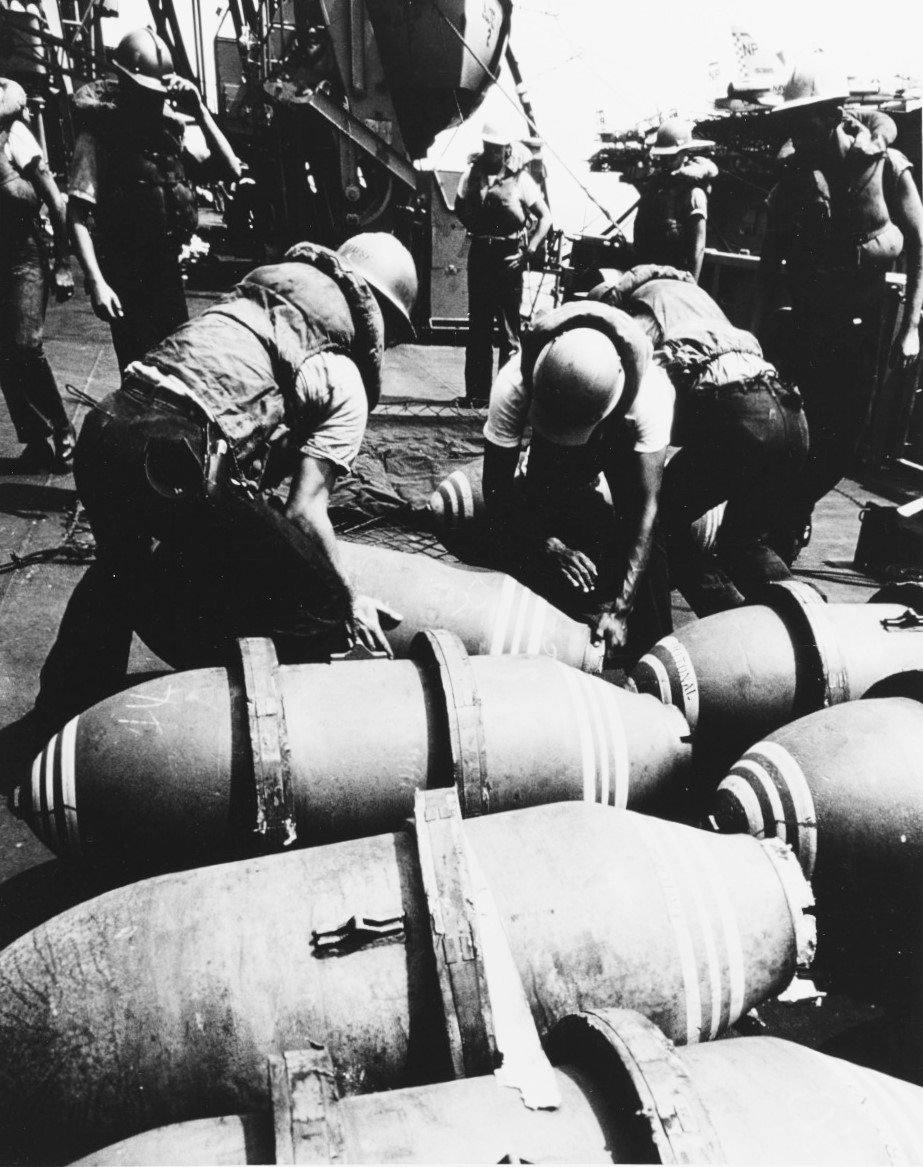
USS Sacramento crewmen transferring M-117 bombs to the USS Hancock during replenishment operations.

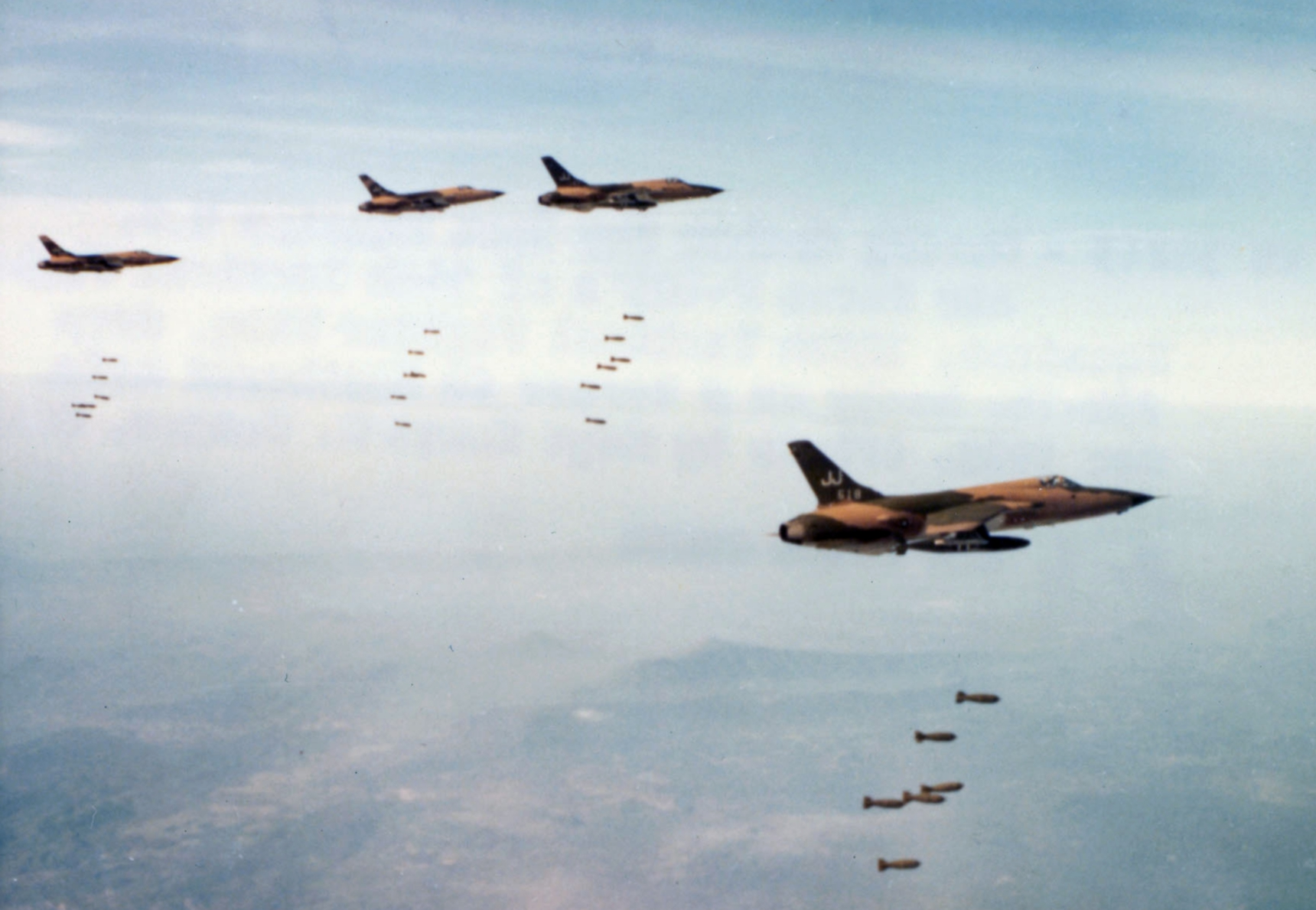
F-105 Thunderchiefs deploying M-117 bombs over Vietnam.

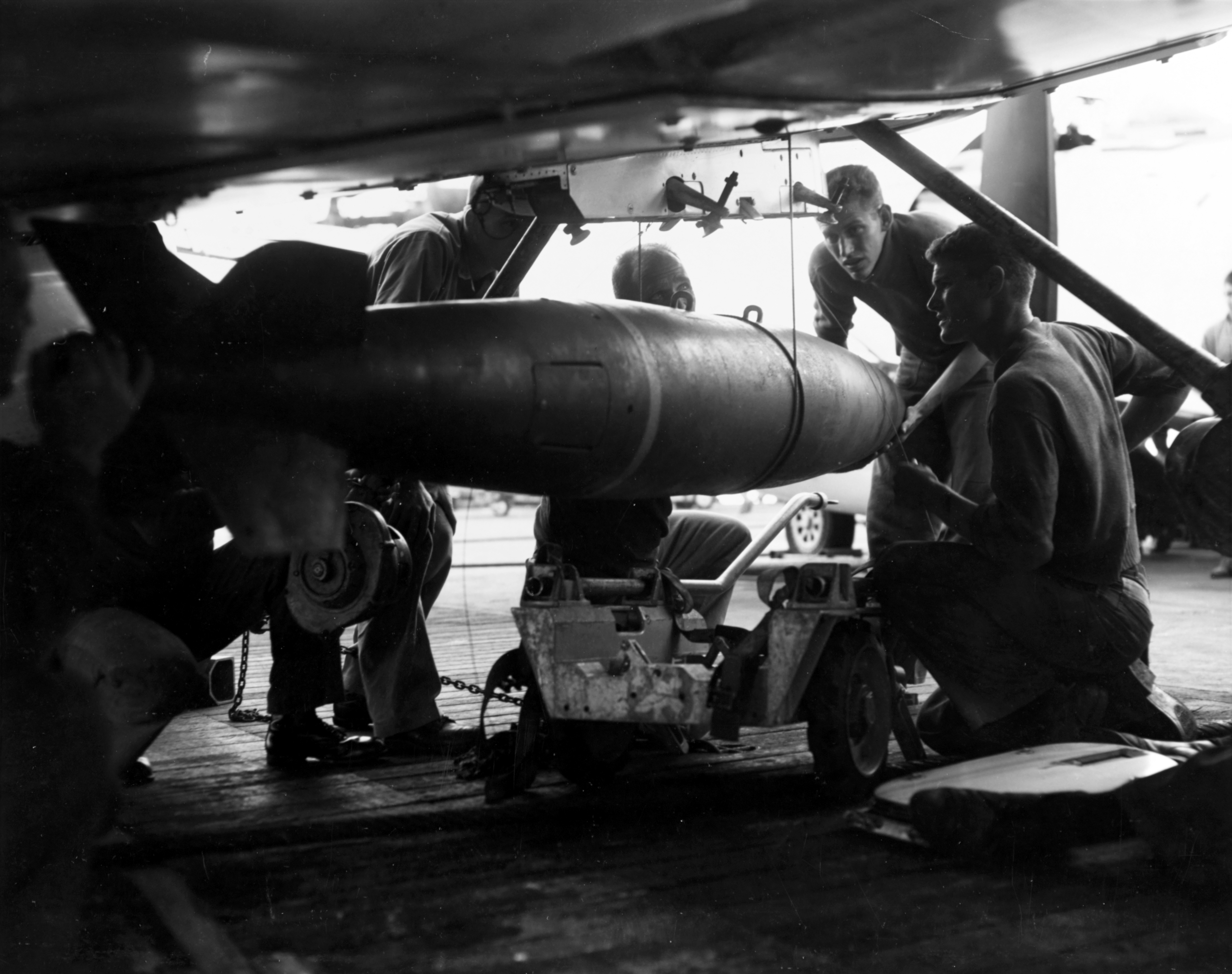
Crewmen aboard USS Ranger (CVA-61) load M-117 bombs aboard a Douglas A-1H Skyraider of VA-95, 24 March 1965.

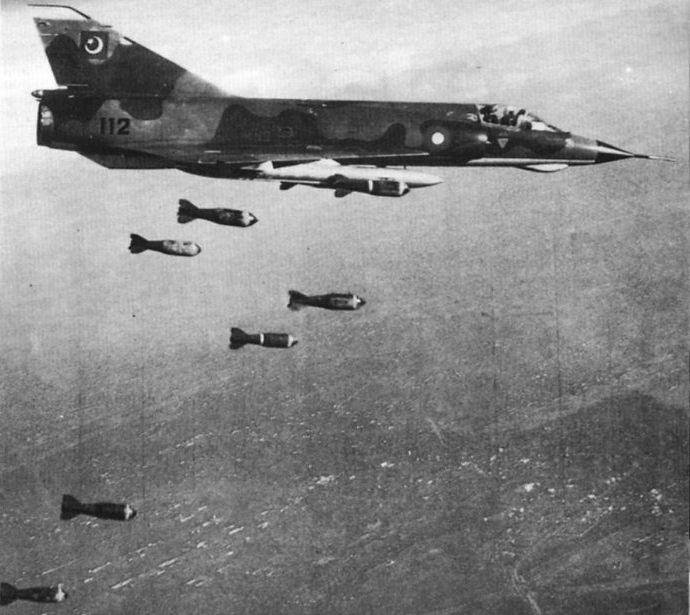
Pakistani Dassault Mirage-IIIEP deploying M117 dumb bombs over Thal ranges during ISAC-1974.

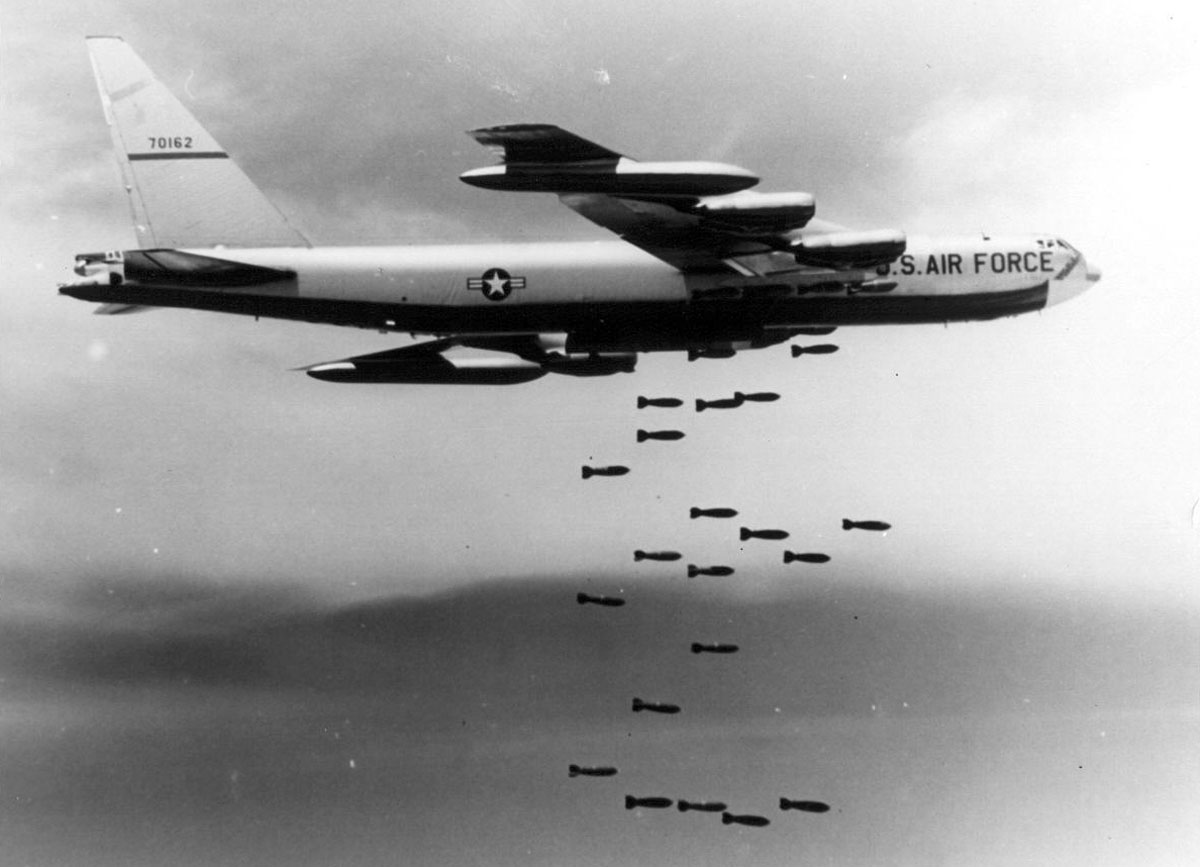
Boeing B-52 deploying M-117 bombs, Vietnam.

== See also ==
- Korean War
- Strategic bombing
