= Paveway IV =

British precision-guided bomb

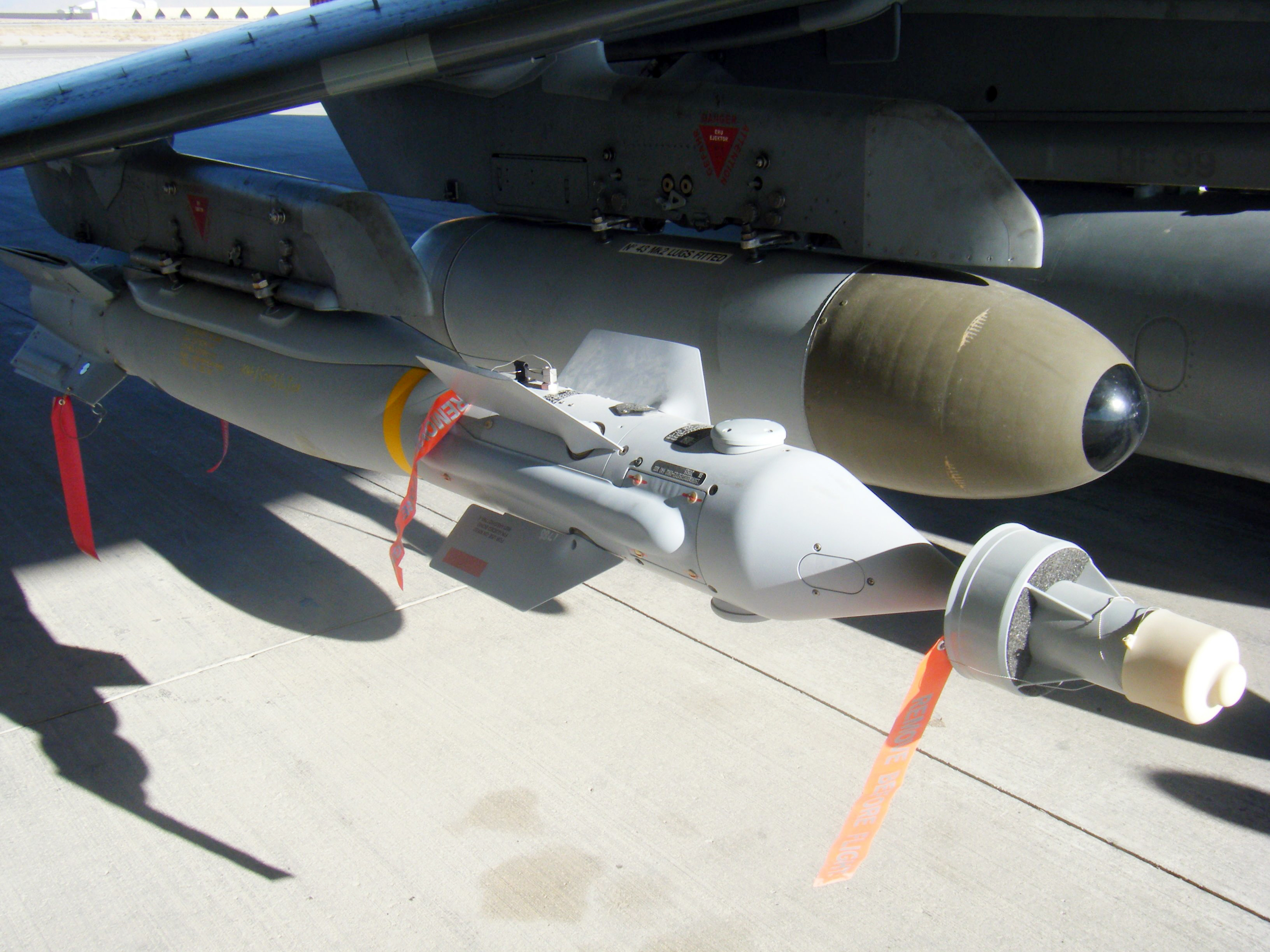
- A Paveway IV laser-guided bomb fitted to a Harrier GR9.
- Type: Precision-guided munition
- Place of origin: United Kingdom

Service history
- In service: 2008
- Used by: Royal Air Force; Royal Saudi Air Force
- Wars: Operation Herrick; Operation Ellamy; Operation Shader; Operation Prosperity Guardian

Production history
- Manufacturer: Raytheon UK

Specifications
- Mass: 500 lb (230 kg)
- Guidance system: Inertial, GPS Aided Inertial and/or Semi-Active Laser
- Launch platform: British Aerospace Harrier II; Panavia Tornado; Eurofighter Typhoon; Lockheed Martin F-35 Lightning II

Paveway IV is a dual mode GPS/INS and laser-guided bomb manufactured by Raytheon UK (formerly Raytheon Systems Limited). It is the latest iteration of the Paveway series.

The weapon is a guidance kit based on the existing Enhanced Paveway II Enhanced Computer Control Group (ECCG) added to a modified Mk 82 general-purpose bomb with increased penetration performance. The new ECCG contains a Height of Burst (HOB) sensor enabling air burst fusing options, and a SAASM (Selective Availability Anti Spoofing Module) compliant GPS receiver. It can be launched either IMU (Inertial Measurement Unit) only, given sufficiently good Transfer Alignment, or using GPS guidance. Terminal laser guidance is available in either navigation mode.

== History ==
The Paveway IV entered service with the Royal Navy in 2008.

The Paveway IV's first export sale was to the Royal Saudi Air Force in a deal worth approximately £150 million (US $247 million). The deal had been delayed for several years by the U.S. State Department which had to authorise the bomb's sale due to its use of American components. A contract was signed in December 2013 with Congressional approval given two months later, with deliveries to begin within 18 months.

The Paveway IV was first used operationally by the Royal Navy during Operation Herrick in Afghanistan. It was later used operationally during Operation Ellamy in Libya, and Operation Shader in Iraq and Syria. In December 2015, the Royal Air Force began strike operations in Syria as part of Operation Shader, and deployed Paveway IV operationally from its Eurofighter Typhoons for the first time.

In January 2015, Eurofighter Typhoons of the Royal Saudi Air Force dropped Paveway IVs on ISIL targets in Syria. This was the first operational deployment of Paveway IV from Typhoon.

Paveway IVs were also used in the Saudi Arabian-led intervention in Yemen. In 2015 for a period export licences were withheld over concern about how they might be used in Yemen, but after some assurances were made exports were resumed. The sales were investigated by the Committees on Arms Export Controls. In December 2016, the Obama administration blocked a transfer of Paveway IV bombs to Saudi Arabia because of concerns about civilian casualties which officials put down to poor targeting.

Raytheon UK is conducting preparatory work to equip the Paveway IV with a bunker-busting warhead as part of the Selective Precision Effects At Range (Spear) Capability 1 program. The compact penetrator has the same outer mold line and mass of the regular Paveway IV and uses a discarding shroud design. A penetrating 500 lb (230 kg) Paveway IV would replace the RAF's previous 2,000 lb (910 kg) Paveway III bunker buster. The penetrating version of the Paveway IV will enter service on the Typhoon in early 2019. Raytheon claims the new warhead has the performance of the BLU-109 penetrating bomb, despite being one-quarter of its weight.

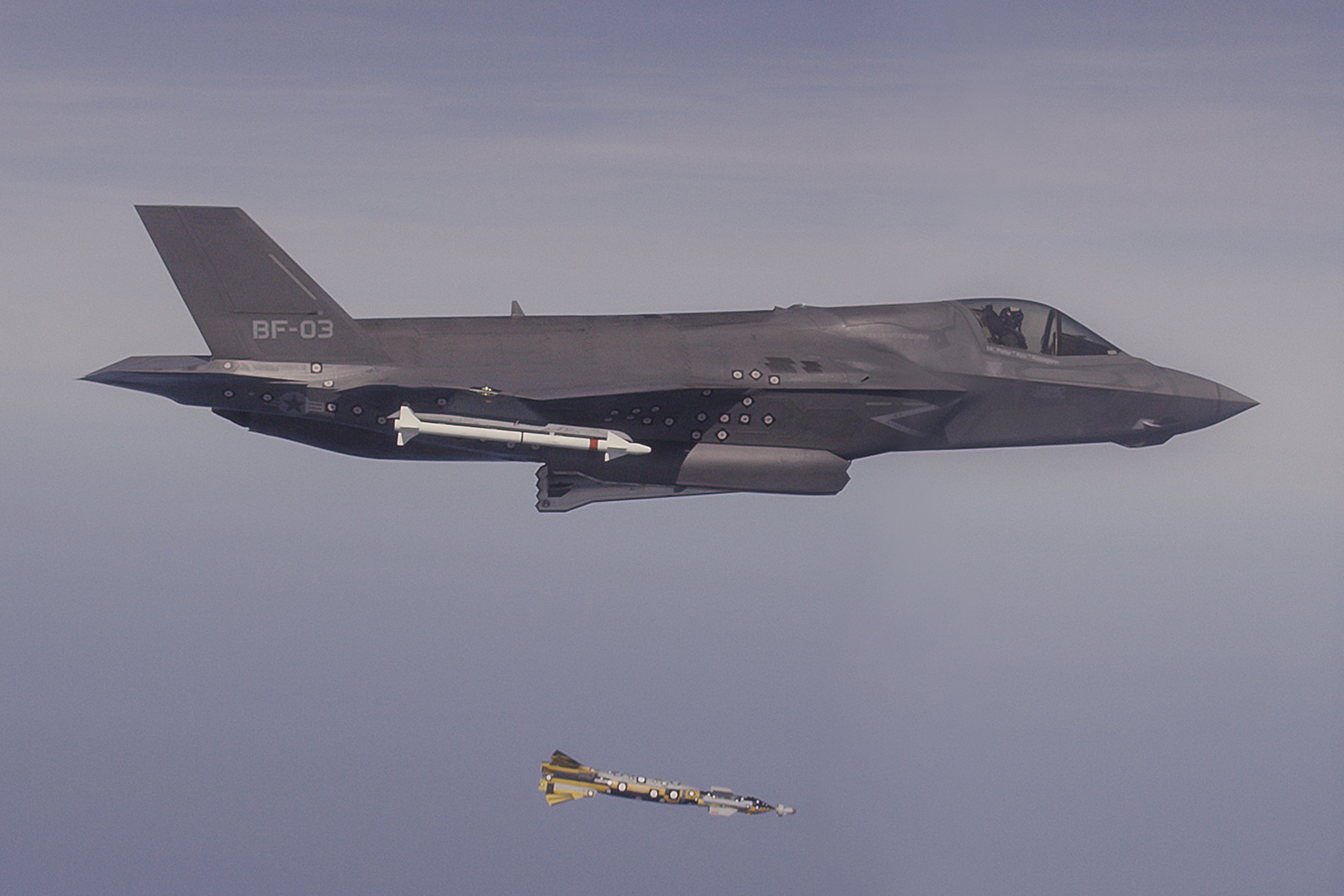
A Paveway IV laser-guided bomb is released from an F-35 Lightning II during trials in the United States.

On 19 June 2015, a Royal Air Force test pilot released two inert Paveway IV laser-guided bombs from a Lockheed Martin F-35 Lightning II during trials in the United States. This marked the first successful firing of a non-US munition during the F-35's development programme. Paveway IV is a future candidate for integration on the aircraft, and will be used operationally by both the Royal Air Force and the Royal Navy when the F-35 enters service with both arms.

During the 2024 missile strikes in Yemen by a US and UK coalition, Royal Air Force Eurofighter Typhoons used Paveway IV bombs to strike Houthi rebels.

== Operators ==
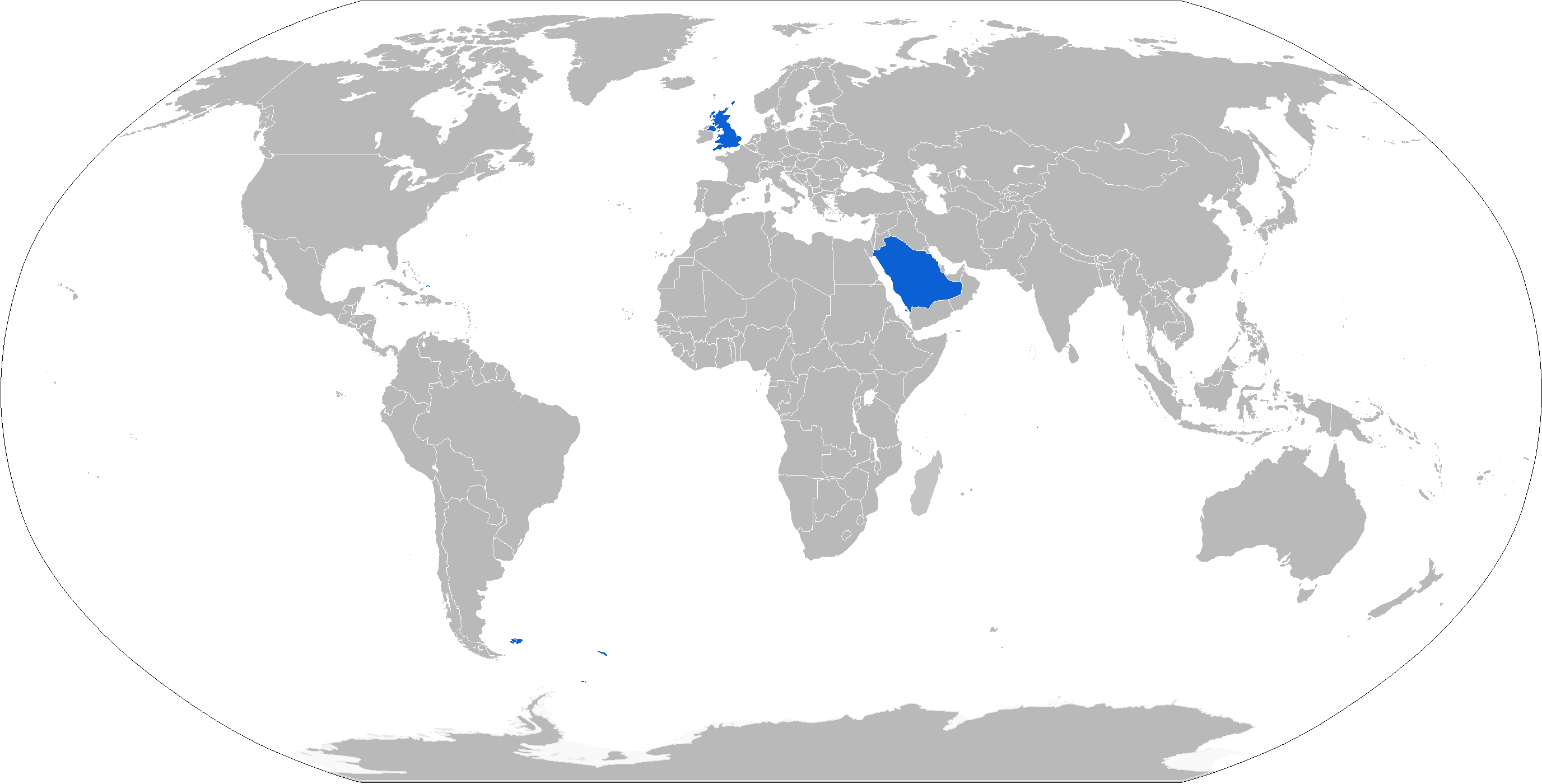
Map with Paveway IV operators in blue

=== Current ===
Saudi Arabia
- Royal Saudi Air Force
United Kingdom
- Royal Air Force

=== Former ===
United Kingdom
- Naval Strike Wing

=== Future ===
United Kingdom
- Fleet Air Arm

Qatar
- Qatar Air Force

Ukraine
- Ukrainian Air Force
