= Paveway =

Laser-guided aerial bomb family

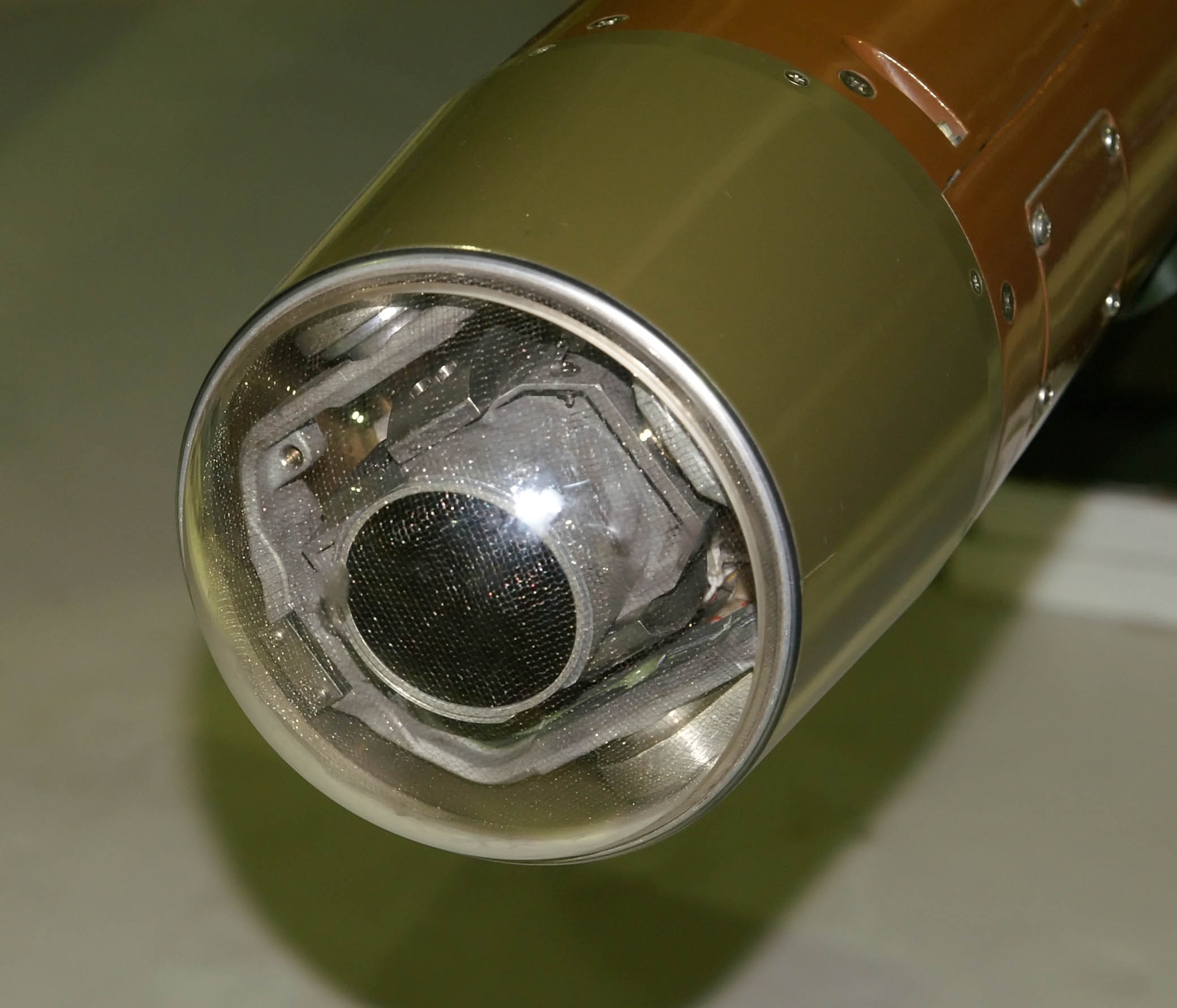
A Paveway III seeker head, at the Royal Air Force Museum London in Hendon, London.

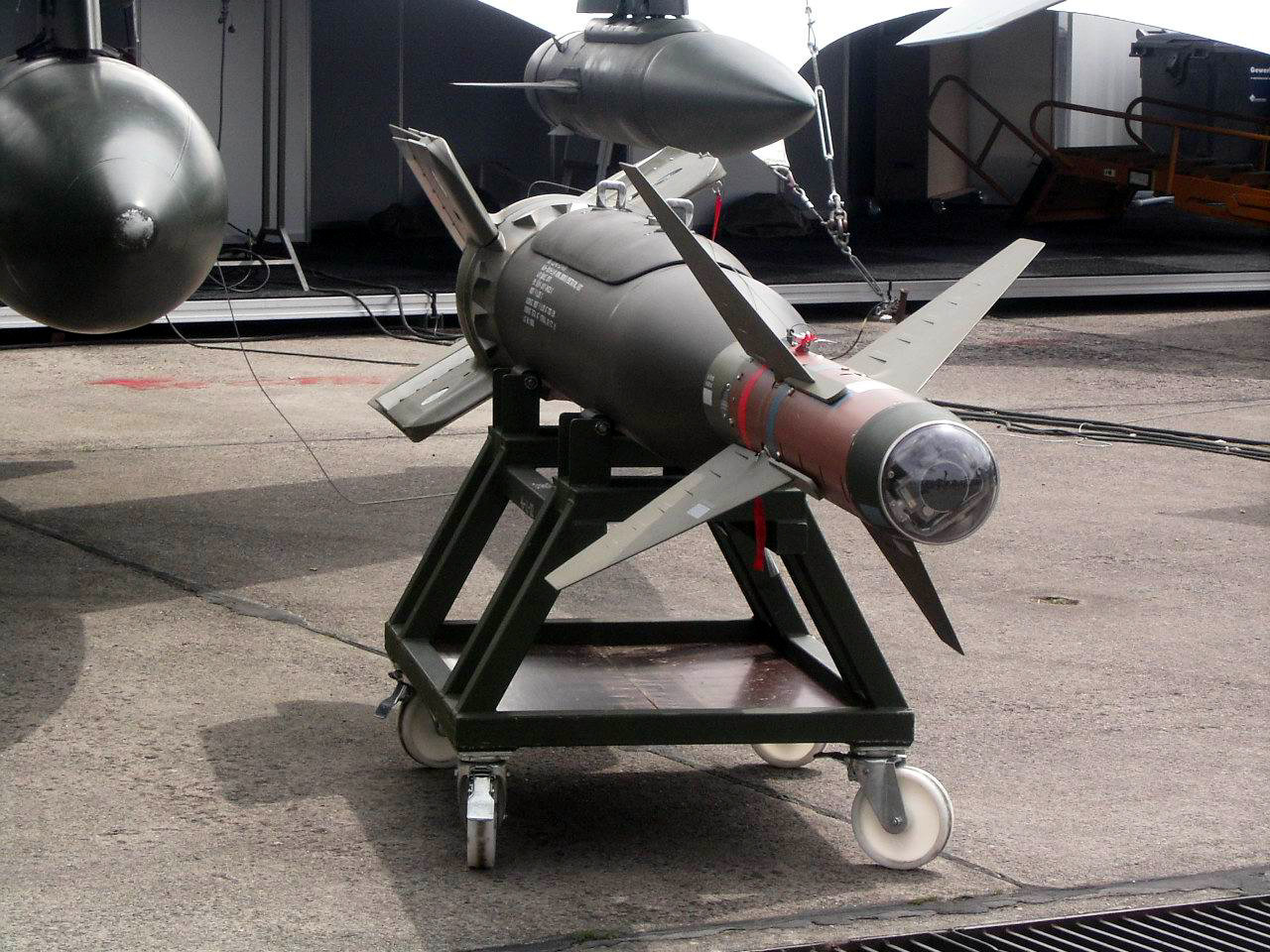
Paveway III at ILA airshow 2006

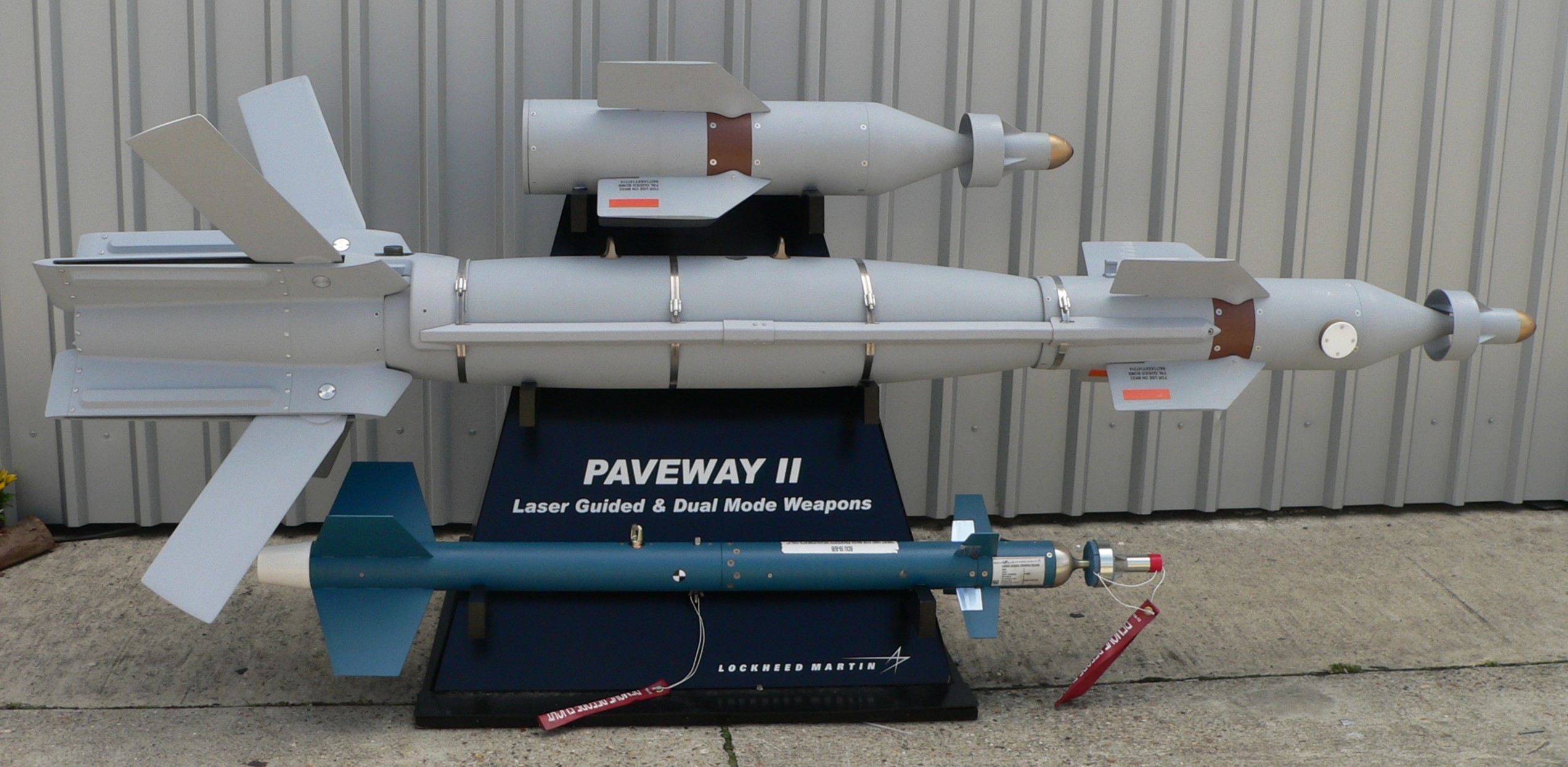
Top to bottom: A Paveway II computer control group, an Enhanced GBU-12, and a Laser-Guided Training Round, at the Paris Air Show 2007

Paveway is a series of laser-guided bombs (LGBs).

Pave or PAVE is sometimes used as an acronym for precision avionics vectoring equipment; literally, electronics for controlling the speed and direction of aircraft. Laser guidance is a form of Pave.

Pave, paired with other words, is the first name for various laser systems that designate targets for LGBs, for example Pave Penny, Pave Spike, Pave Tack and Pave Knife, and for specialized military aircraft, such as AC-130U Pave Spectre, MH-53 Pave Low, and HH-60 Pave Hawk.

== Development ==
The Paveway series of laser-guided bombs was developed by Texas Instruments, with the project starting in 1964. The program was conducted on a shoestring budget, but the resultant emphasis on simplicity and economical engineering proved to be a benefit, and a major advantage over other more complex guided weapons. The first test, using a M117 bomb as the warhead, took place in April 1965.

Early version featured aerodynamic designs led by Richard Johnson.

In January 1967 the US Air Force authorized Project 3169 as the formal engineering program for development of precision guided munitions, renewing its contract with TI in March to redesign the M117 kit, with a very aggressive timeline, projecting deployment for combat testing in the Vietnam War in one year. Direction of the program was assigned to the Guided Bomb Program Office at Wright-Patterson Air Force Base in August and flight testing begun in November at Eglin Air Force Base under the direction of an interagency organization called the Pave Way Task Force. At that time the program had three divisions:

- Paveway 1 – laser-guided munitions
- Paveway 2 – an electro-optical guidance (TV) munition developed by Rockwell International designated HOBO ("Homing Bomb"), of which 4,000 were eventually produced and 500 launched in combat, and
- Paveway 3 – an infrared homing system that was never deployed.

Paveway 1 became the emphasis of the program because Paveway 2, although considerably more accurate and capable, cost 4-5 times more per unit and was much less applicable to most targeting situations in Vietnam. Prototype weapons were sent to Southeast Asia for combat testing with the 8th Tactical Fighter Wing from May to August 1968. In the combat evaluations the BOLT-117 achieved a circular error probability (CEP) of 75 feet (23 m) while the Paveway achieved a CEP of 20 feet (6.1 m) with one in every four bombs scoring a direct hit.

Paveway kits attach to a variety of warheads, and consist of a semi-active laser (SAL) seeker, a computer control group (CCG) containing guidance and control electronics, thermal battery, and pneumatic control augmentation system (CAS). There are front control canards and rear wings for stability. The weapon guides on reflected laser energy: the seeker detects the reflected light ("sparkle") of the designating laser, and actuates the canards to guide the bomb toward the designated point.

The original Paveway series, retroactively named Paveway I, gave way in the early 1970s to the improved Paveway II, which had a simplified, more reliable seeker and pop-out rear wings to improve the weapon's glide performance. Both Paveway I and Paveway II use a simple 'bang-bang' control system, where the CAS commands large canard deflections to make course corrections, resulting in a noticeable wobble. This had relatively little effect on accuracy, but expends energy quickly, limiting effective range. As a consequence, most users release Paveway I and II weapons in a ballistic trajectory, activating the laser designator only late in the weapon's flight to refine the impact point.

In 1976, the USAF issued a requirement for a new generation, dubbed Paveway III, that finally entered service in 1986. The Paveway III system used a much more sophisticated seeker with a wider field of view and proportional guidance, minimizing the energy loss of course corrections. Paveway III has a considerably longer glide range and greater accuracy than Paveway II, but it is substantially more expensive, limiting its use to high-value targets. Although Paveway III kits were developed for the smaller Mk 82 weapons, limited effectiveness caused the USAF to adopt the kit only for the larger 907 kg (2,000 lb) class weapons (the Mk 84 and BLU-109). Paveway III guidance kits were also used on the GBU-28/B penetration bomb fielded at the close of the 1991 Gulf War. The Paveway III system was also used during the Indian offensive in the Kargil War of 1999 by the Indian Air Force with the Mirage 2000 as a launch platform. Raytheon, the sole provider of Paveway III variants, is currently delivering both standard and enhanced versions to the US Government and foreign customers.

Existing LGBs in US service can be upgraded to Dual Mode Laser Guided Bombs (DMLGB) by adding GPS receivers which enable all weather employment. Lockheed Martin won the initial contract to provide DMLGBs to the US Navy (USN) in 2005, however subsequent-year money has been "zeroed" in favor of a follow-on Direct Attack Moving Target Capability (DAMTC) program. Raytheon's version, the "Enhanced Paveway II", has been contracted both within the US and abroad. In US service it is designated the GBU-49.

Raytheon's advanced Paveway IV 225 kg (500 lb) bomb has been in service since 2008 with Britain's RAF. In 2017 the F-35 program office rushed to field the GBU-49 to use its ability to strike moving targets and fill the gap left by the early retirement of the CBU-103 cluster bomb.

In March 2017, Lockheed rebranded its Paveway Dual-Mode Plus weapon as the "Paragon" with the aim of competing against the laser-guided variant of the JDAM, as it offers the same capability while being "at least 30 percent cheaper" due to new, less costly microprocessors and engineering for the guidance electronics.

== Variants ==
The Paveway series of bombs includes:

- GBU-10 Paveway II – Mk 84 or BLU-109 2,000 lb (907 kg) bomb
- GBU-11 Paveway – M118 3,000 lb (1,360 kg) bomb. Saw limited use during the Vietnam War
- GBU-12 Paveway II – Mk 82 500 lb (227 kg) bomb
- GBU-16 Paveway II – Mk 83 1,000 lb (454 kg) bomb
- GBU-58 Paveway II – Mk 81 250 lb (113.4 kg) bomb
- GBU-22 Paveway III – Mk 82 500 lb (227 kg) bomb. Developed at the same time as GBU-24, with some limited export success, but was not adopted by United States as it was felt to be too small a warhead for the desired effects at the time.
- GBU-24 Paveway III – Mk 84/BLU-109 2,000 lb (907 kg) class bomb
- GBU-27 Paveway III – BLU-109 2,000 lb (907 kg) bomb with penetration warhead, specially designed for F-117 because the large fins of GBU-24 couldn't fit into the bomb bay of F-117.
- GBU-28 Paveway III – During the Gulf War, the deepest and most hardened Iraqi bunkers could not be defeated by the BLU-109/B penetrator warhead, so a much more powerful "bunker buster" GBU-28 was developed. The latest warhead used in the GBU-28/B series is the BLU-122/B, a development of earlier BLU-113 on early GBU-28s.
- Paveway IV – 500 lb (227 kg) bomb
- GBU-48 Enhanced Paveway II – Mk 83 1,000 lb (454 kg) bomb. Raytheon's Enhanced dual-mode GPS and Laser guided version of the laser-only GBU-16.
- GBU-49 Enhanced Paveway II – BLU-133 500 lb (227 kg) bomb. Raytheon's Enhanced dual-mode GPS and Laser guided version of the laser-only GBU-12.
- GBU-50 Enhanced Paveway II – Mk 84 or BLU-109 2,000 lb (907 kg) bomb. Raytheon's Enhanced dual-mode GPS and Laser guided version of the laser-only GBU-10.
- GBU-59 Enhanced Paveway II – Mk 81 250 lb (113.4 kg) bomb. Raytheon's Enhanced dual-mode GPS and Laser guided version of the laser-only GBU-58.

Although GBU-48 etc. are the formal designation for the versions with GPS/INS, they are widely referred to as EGBU-16 etc. ("Enhanced GBU-16").

=== Numbering systems ===
Due to the aforementioned numbering systems, there is considerable scope for confusion regarding weapons called 'Paveway X'. The numbering systems include:

- The original numbering system from 1-3, with the different planned variants differing in types of guidance. As 2 and 3 never entered service, this numbering system is obsolete.
- The system used currently by US forces, which numbers in chronological order
- The system used by the RAF, which numbers earlier versions of the Paveway as 2 and 3 - with 2 referring to a 1,000 lb bomb and 3 referring to a 2,000 lb bomb - and Enhanced Paveway 2 and 3 to refer to GPS/INS-added versions of the same. The Paveway 4 is the same weapon in this and the above system.

== Assembly ==
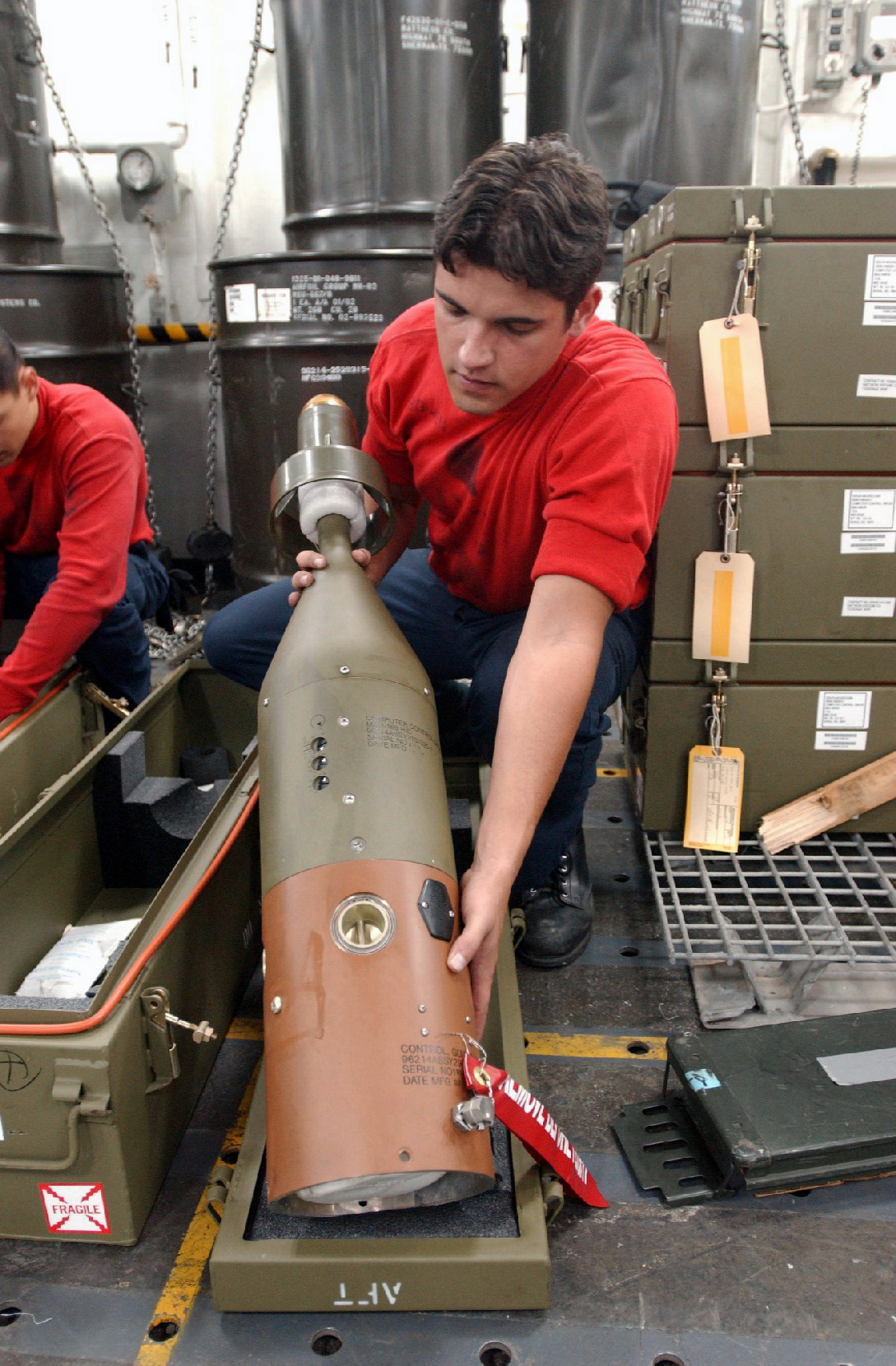

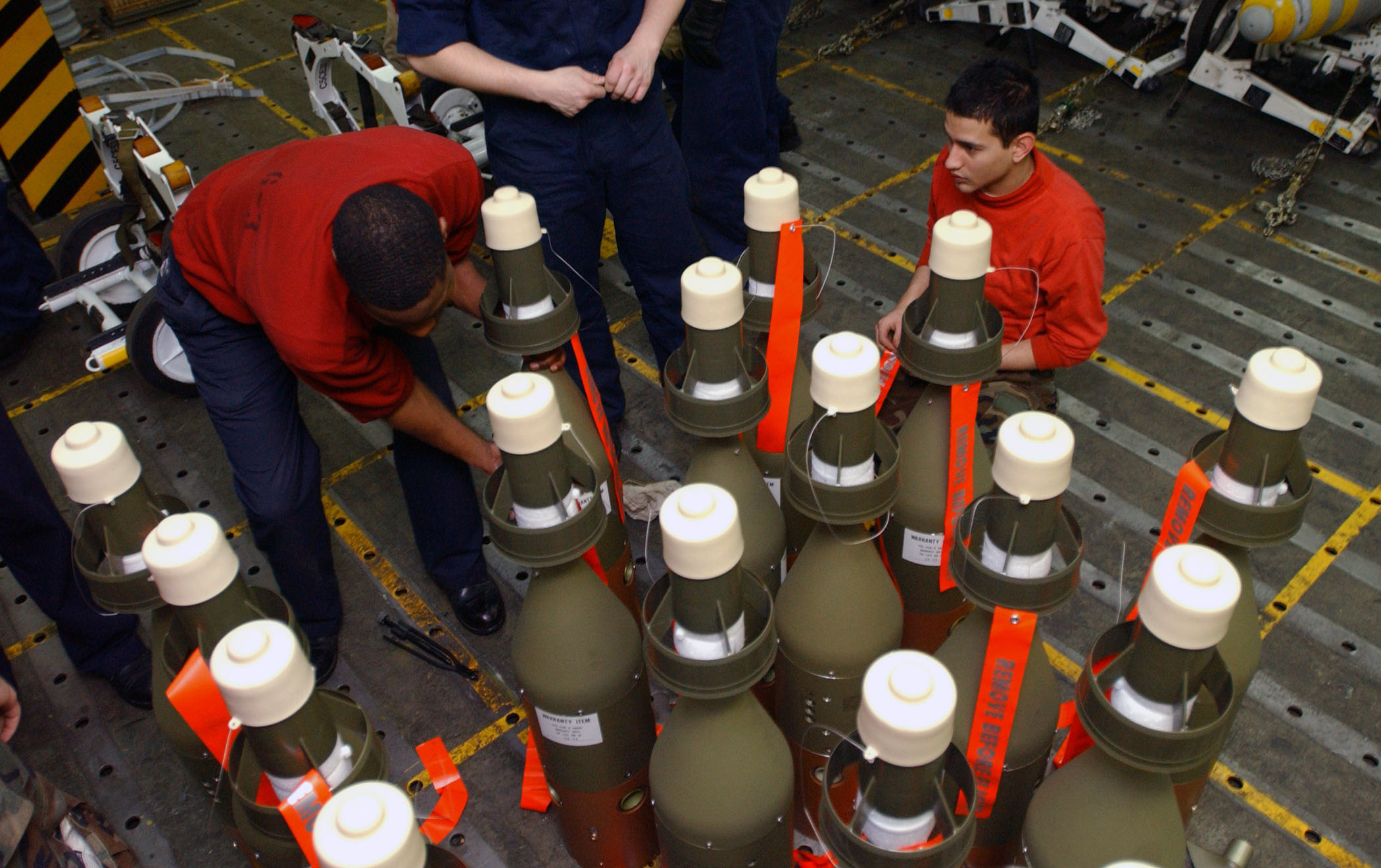

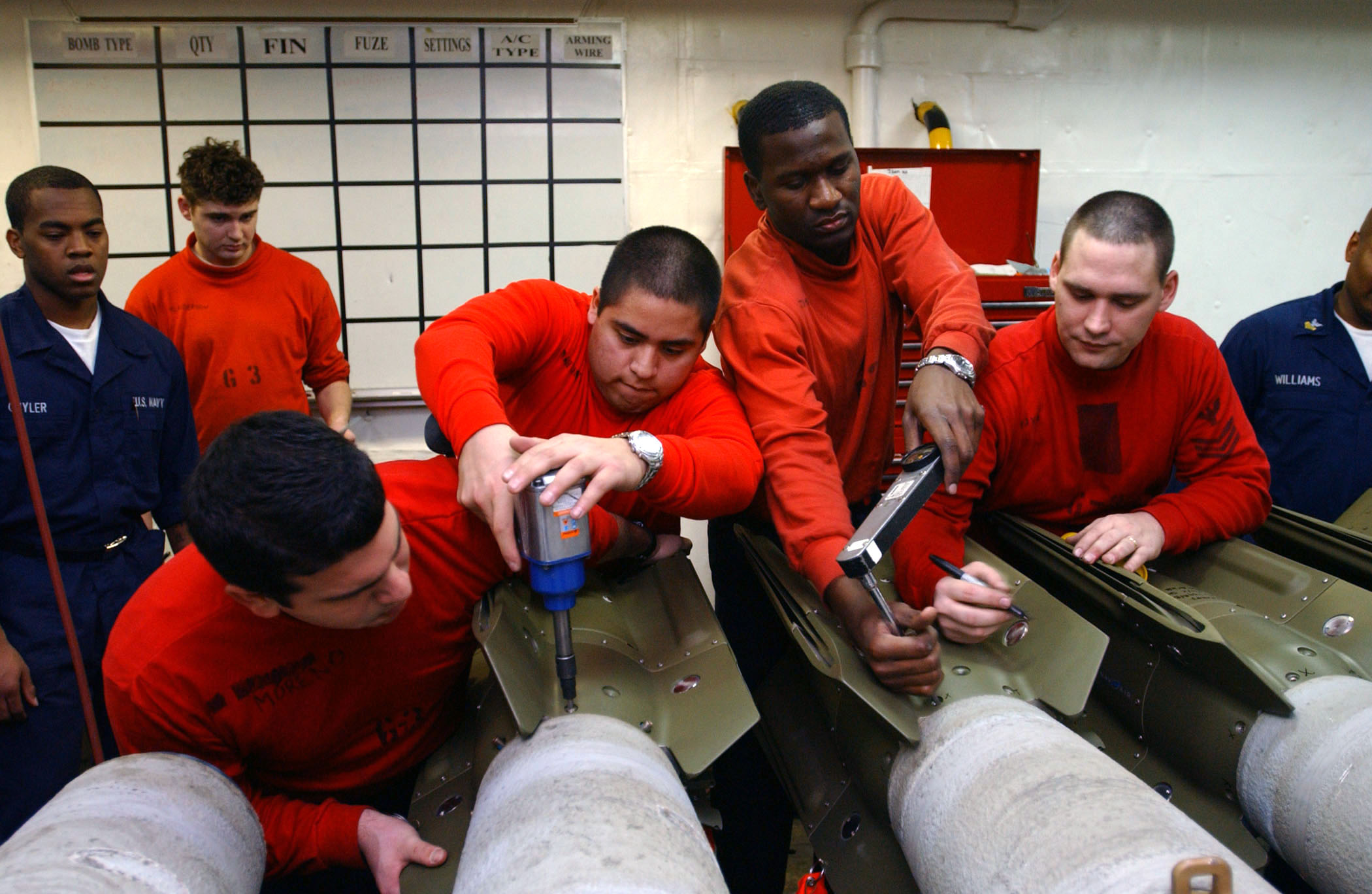

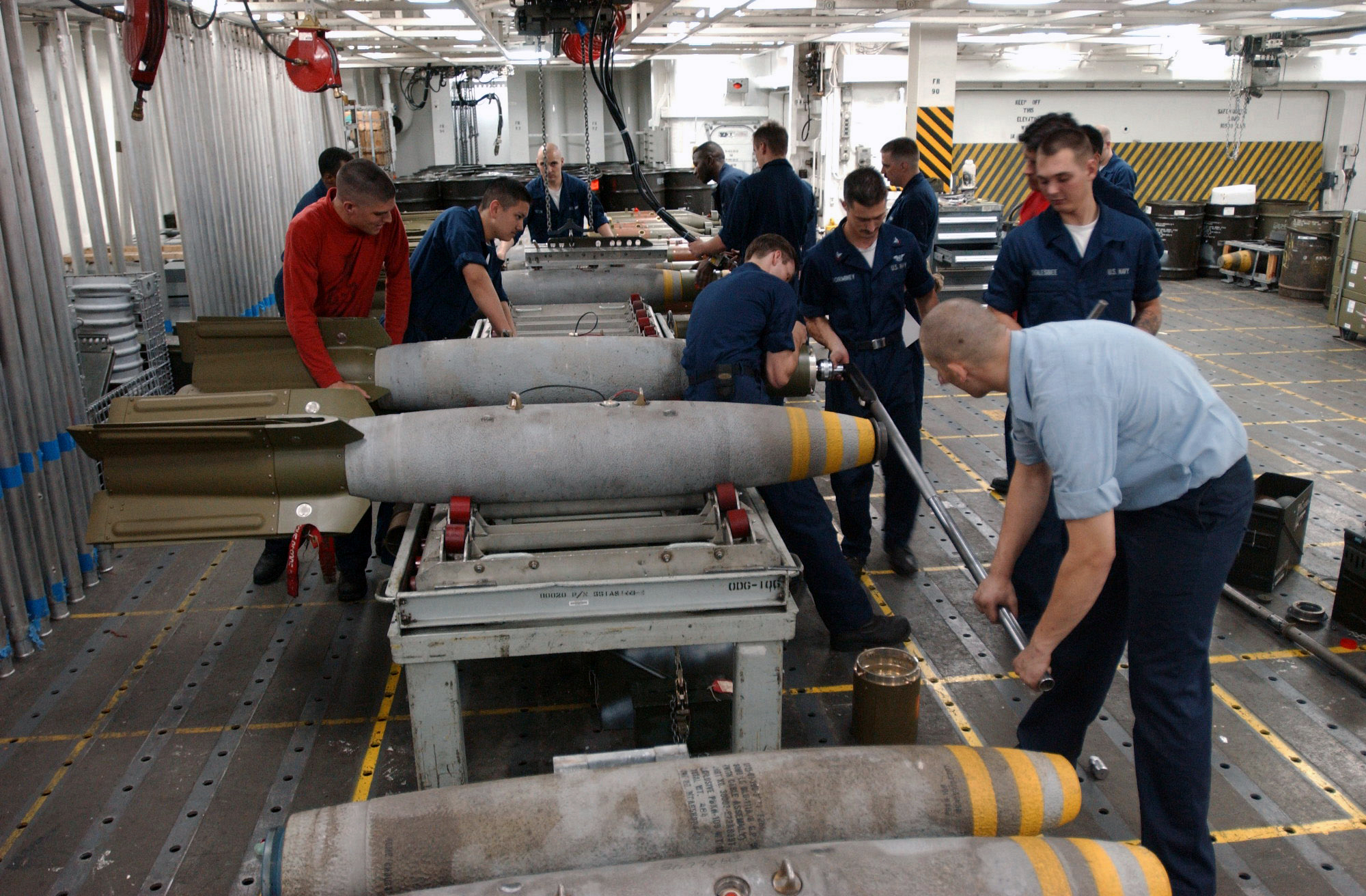

== Trademark ==
Lockheed Martin and Raytheon compete to supply LGBs to the United States Air Force, and others. Raytheon claimed the exclusive right to use Paveway™ as a trademark for selling LGB-related products. Lockheed Martin claimed Paveway is a generic term in the defense industry. Lockheed objected to Raytheon's registration of Paveway in opposition proceedings before the United States Patent and Trademark Office. On September 27, 2011, the USPTO Trademark Trial and Appeal Board decided that Paveway is a generic term, in the United States, for LGBs.

Raytheon subsequently sued Lockheed Martin in Arizona federal court alleging trademark infringement, Lockheed filed counterclaims in the suit. In September, 2014 the companies agreed that Raytheon is the exclusive owner of "Paveway™" for laser-guided bombs and related goods and services and that "Paveway" is a protectable trademark, but that Raytheon will license the mark to Lockheed for use in connection with single-mode laser-guided bomb kits. The two companies compete each year for US and foreign orders.

== Platforms ==
- Boeing B-52 Stratofortress
- Rockwell B-1 Lancer
- Northrop Grumman B-2 Spirit
- General Dynamics F-111F Aardvark
- Lockheed F-117 Nighthawk
- McDonnell Douglas F-4 Phantom II
- Northrop F-5
- Grumman F-14 Tomcat
- McDonnell Douglas F-15 Eagle variants (F-15E and F-15EX)
- General Dynamics F-16 Fighting Falcon
- McDonnell Douglas F/A-18 Hornet
- Lockheed Martin F-35 Lightning II
- Douglas A-4 Skyhawk
- Grumman A-6 Intruder
- LTV A-7 Corsair II
- McDonnell Douglas AV-8B Harrier II
- Fairchild Republic A-10 Thunderbolt II
- General Atomics MQ-9 Reaper
- SEPECAT Jaguar
- AMX International AMX
- Blackburn Buccaneer
- Harrier jump jet
- BAE Systems Hawk
- Dassault/Dornier Alpha Jet
- Dassault-Breguet Super Étendard
- Dassault Rafale
- Dassault Mirage F1
- Dassault Mirage 2000
- Dassault Mirage III
- Panavia Tornado
- Sukhoi Su-30MKM (testing)
- Eurofighter Typhoon

== See also ==
- Armement Air-Sol Modulaire
- Joint Direct Attack Munition (JDAM) – a GPS guidance pack for a standard iron bomb, made by Boeing
- SCALPEL
