= Mark 82 bomb =

500 lb unguided aerial bomb

Mark 82 General Purpose bomb
- Type: Low-drag general-purpose bomb
- Place of origin: United States

Service history
- In service: Since 1950s

Production history
- Manufacturer: General Dynamics
- Unit cost: US$4,000
- Variants: GBU-12 Paveway II; GBU-22 Paveway III; GBU‐38 JDAM; JDAM-ER; Paveway IV

Specifications
- Mass: 531 lb (241 kg)
- Length: 7 ft 3 in (2.21 m)
- Diameter: 10.7 in (273 mm)
- Filling: Tritonal, Comp H-6 or PBXN-109
- Filling weight: 196 lb (89 kg)
- References: Janes & The War Zone

The Mark 82 is a 500-pound (230 kg) unguided, low-drag general-purpose bomb, part of the United States Mark 80 series. The explosive filling is usually tritonal, though other compositions have sometimes been used.

It is manufactured by Australia, the United States and Turkey.

== Development and deployment ==
With a nominal weight of 500 lb (230 kg), it is one of the smallest bombs in current service, and one of the most common air-dropped weapons in the world. Although the Mk82's nominal weight is 500 lb (230 kg), its actual weight varies depending on its configuration, from 510 to 570 lb (230 to 260 kg). It is a streamlined steel casing containing 192 lb (87 kg) of Tritonal high explosive. The Mk82 is offered with a variety of fin kits, fuzes, and retarders for different purposes.

The Mk82 is the warhead for the GBU-12 laser-guided bombs and for the GBU-38 JDAM.

Over many years Nitro-Chem in Bydgoszcz, Poland was the only provider of certified TNT for U.S. Department of Defense. As of 2021 also the General Dynamics plant in Garland, Texas was providing bombs for the US Armed Forces.

The Mk82 is currently undergoing a minor redesign to allow it to meet the insensitive munitions requirements set by Congress.

According to a test report conducted by the United States Navy's Weapon Systems Explosives Safety Review Board established in the wake of the 1967 USS Forrestal fire, the cooking off time for a Mk82 is approximately 2 minutes 30 seconds.

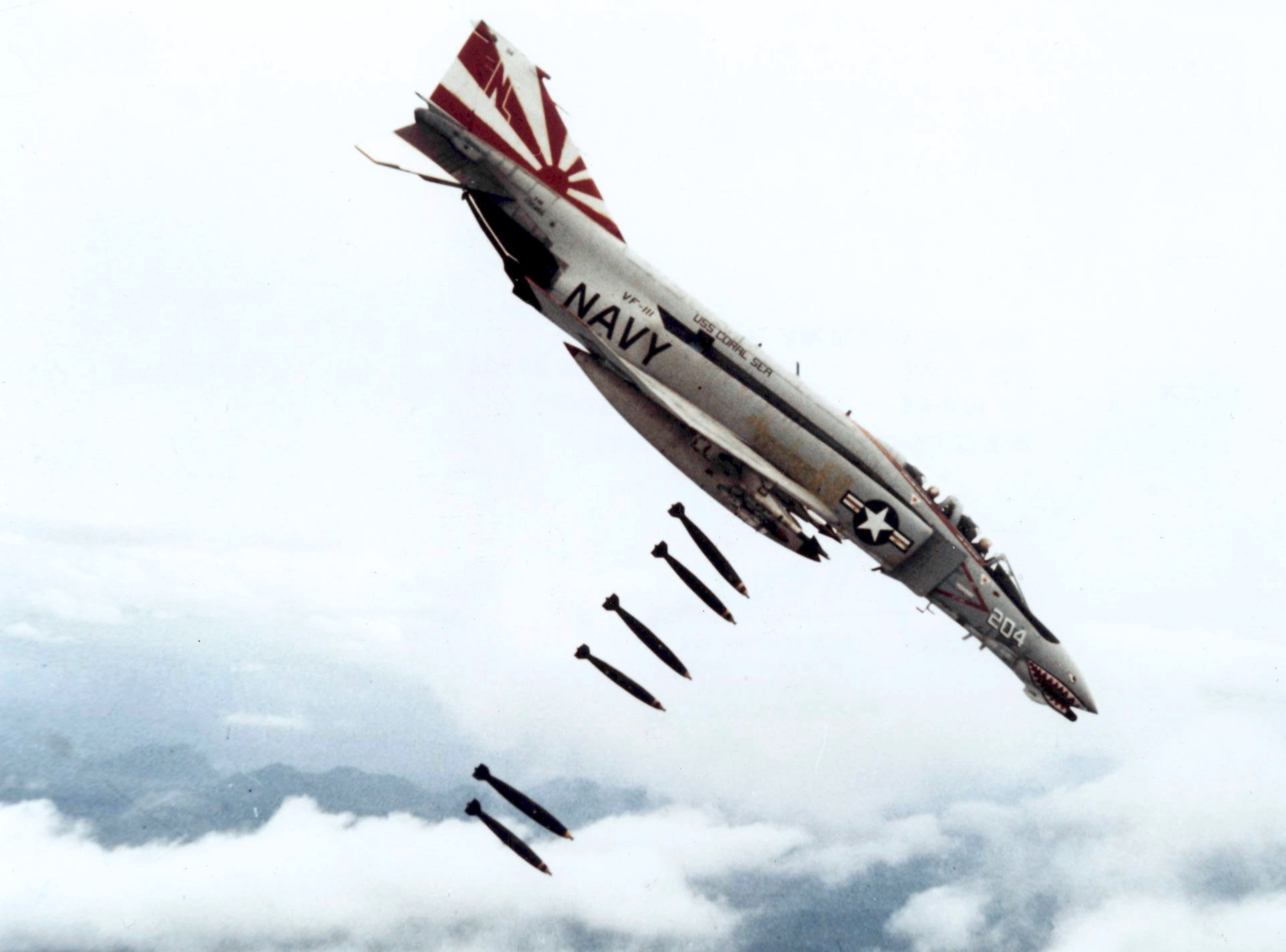
U.S. Navy McDonnell F-4B Phantom II of VF-111 Sundowners deploying Mark 82 bombs over Vietnam, 1971.

More than 4,500 GBU-12/Mk82 laser-guided bombs were dropped on Iraq during the Persian Gulf War. France requested 1,200 Mk82s in 2010 to Société des Ateliers Mécaniques de Pont-sur-Sambre (SAMP) which builds Mk82s under license. Saudi Arabia requested 8,000 Mk82s in 2015, along with guidance kits and other weapons.

In August, 2018, a Mark 82 bomb was used for Saudi Arabia's Dahyan air strike in Yemen. Munitions experts confirmed that the numbers on it identified Lockheed Martin as its maker and that this particular Mk82 was a Paveway, a laser-guided bomb.

== Low-level delivery ==
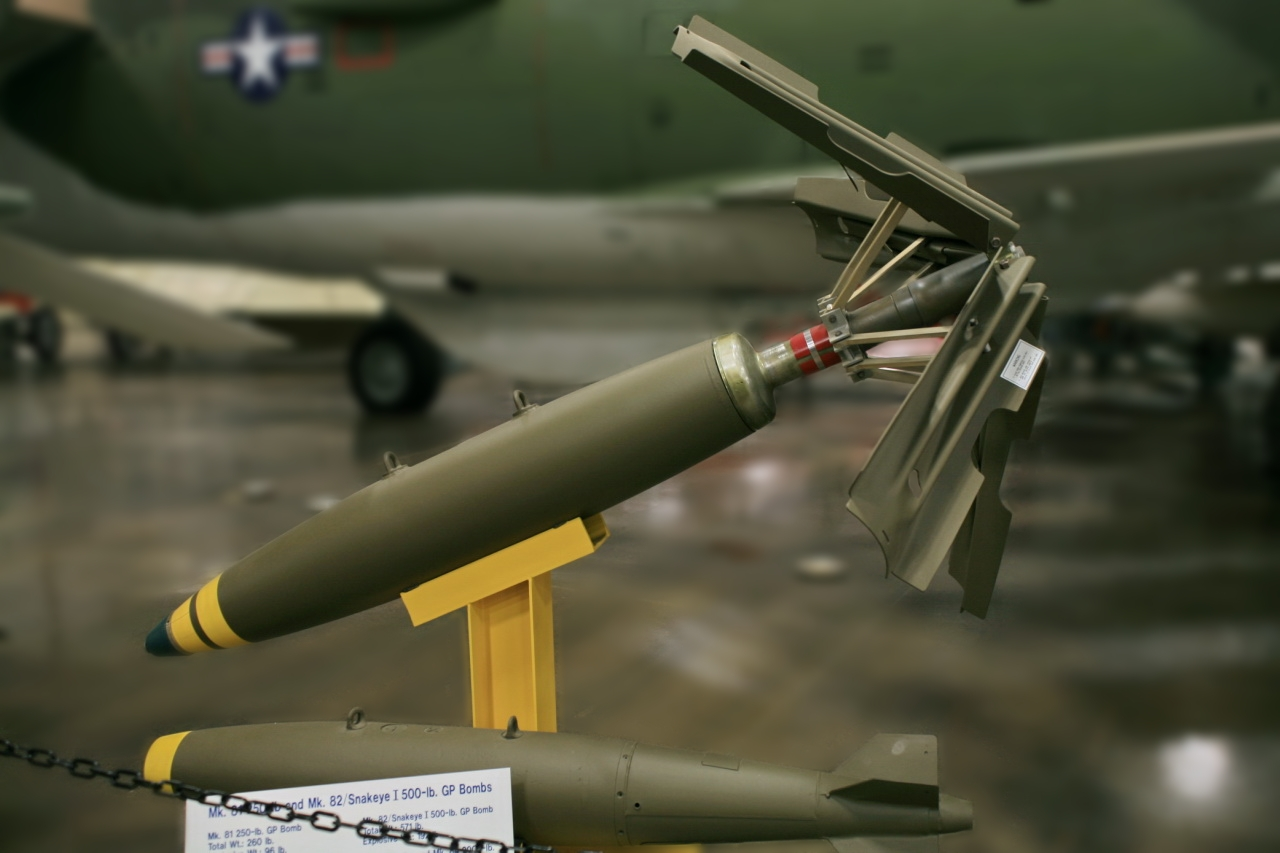
Museum-based inert Mark 82 bomb with a Snake Eye Tail Retarding Device – displaying deployed high-drag tail-fin for low-altitude release.

In low-level bombing, it is possible for the delivering aircraft to sustain damage from the blast and fragmentation effects of its own munitions since the aircraft and ordnance arrive at the target almost simultaneously. To address this issue, the standard Mk82 General-Purpose bomb can be fitted with a special high-drag tail fin unit. In this configuration, it is referred to as the Mk82 Snake Eye. The tail unit has four folded fins that spring open into a cruciform shape when the bomb is released, slowing the bomb by increasing drag, thus allowing the delivery aircraft to safely pass over the target before the bomb hits it.

== Variants ==
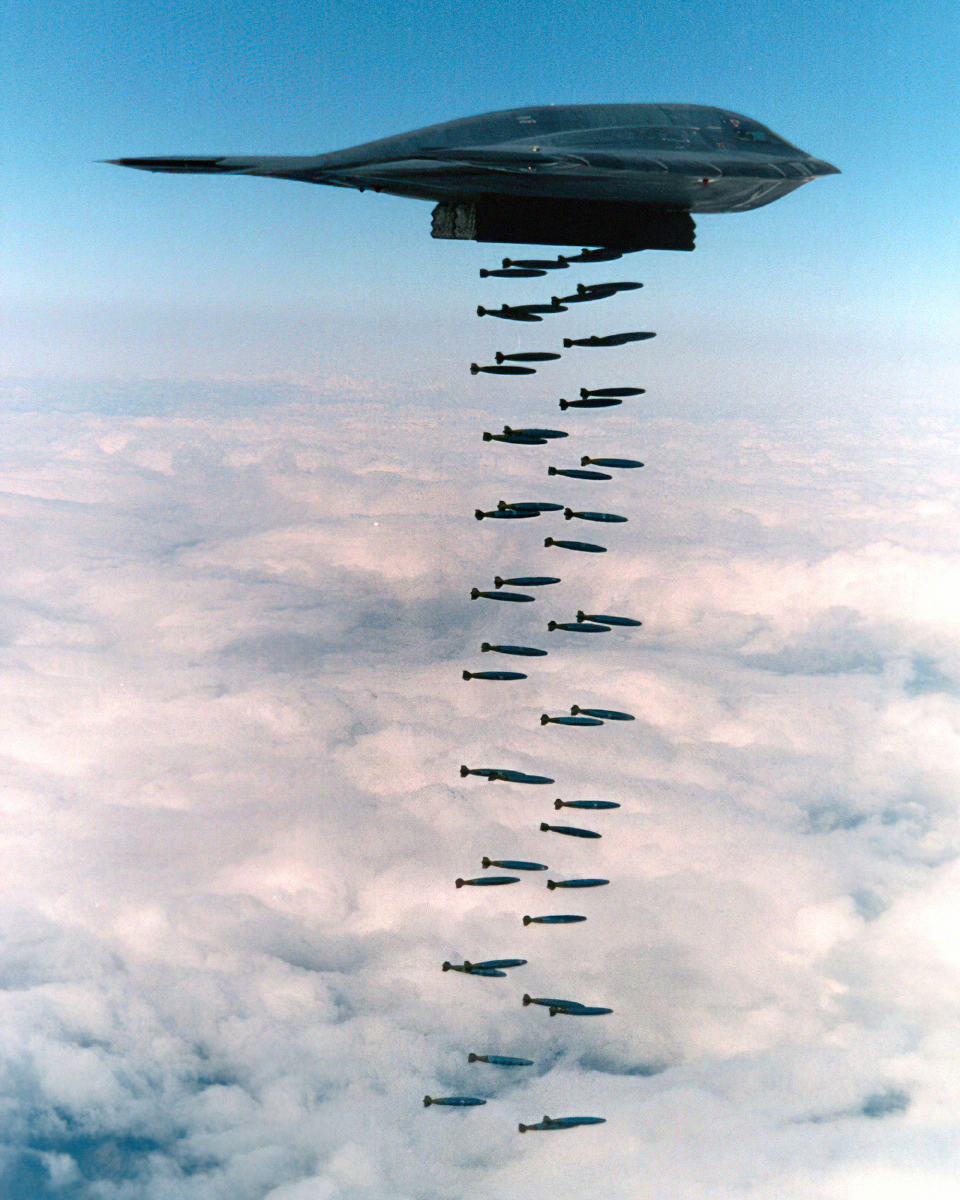
A B-2 Spirit dropping Mk82 bombs into the Pacific Ocean in a 1994 training exercise off Point Mugu, California.

- BLU-111(AUS)B/B – Australian variant of the Mk82, fitted with both JDAM and Paveway II guidance kits.
- BLU-111/B – Mk82 casing filled with PBXN-109 (instead of Composition H6); item weighs 481 lb (218 kg). PBXN-109 is a less sensitive explosive filler when compared to H6. The BLU-111/B also is the warhead of the A-1 version of the Joint Stand-Off Weapon.
- BLU-111A/B – Used by the U.S. Navy, this is the BLU-111/B with a thermal-protective coating added to reduce cook-off in (fuel-related) fires.
- BLU-126/B – Designed following a U.S. Navy request to lower collateral damage in air strikes. Delivery of this type started in March 2007. Also known as the Low Collateral Damage Bomb (LCDB), it is a BLU-111 with a smaller explosive charge. Inert ballast is added to match the original weight of the BLU-111, which gives it the same trajectory when dropped.
- BLU-129/B – U.S. Air Force Mark 82 version with a composite warhead case that disintegrates upon detonation to minimize fragmentation, decreasing damage to nearby structures and reducing the chances of collateral damage. The carbon fiber composite shell achieves three-times less collateral damage by keeping the blast radius tight, while the tungsten-laden case high explosive has greater lethality in that blast radius. Entered service in 2011 with some 800 units produced until early 2015. USAF is looking to restart production for domestic and international consumption.
- Mark 62 Quickstrike mine – A naval mine, which is a conversion of the Mark 82 bomb.
- Mark 82 Mod 7 – Near-term solution for cluster bomb replacement that replaces the forged steel casing with a unitary "cast ductile iron" warhead and reconfigured burst height and fuze locations, dispersing iron fragmentation over a large area to fulfill area-attack requirements with less chance of unexploded ordnance. To enter service by 2018.
- MK82-T (Tendürek) –Turkish variant of Mk82 with a thermobaric warhead, can be fitted with locally produced HGK, LGK, and KGK guidance kits.

== Gallery ==
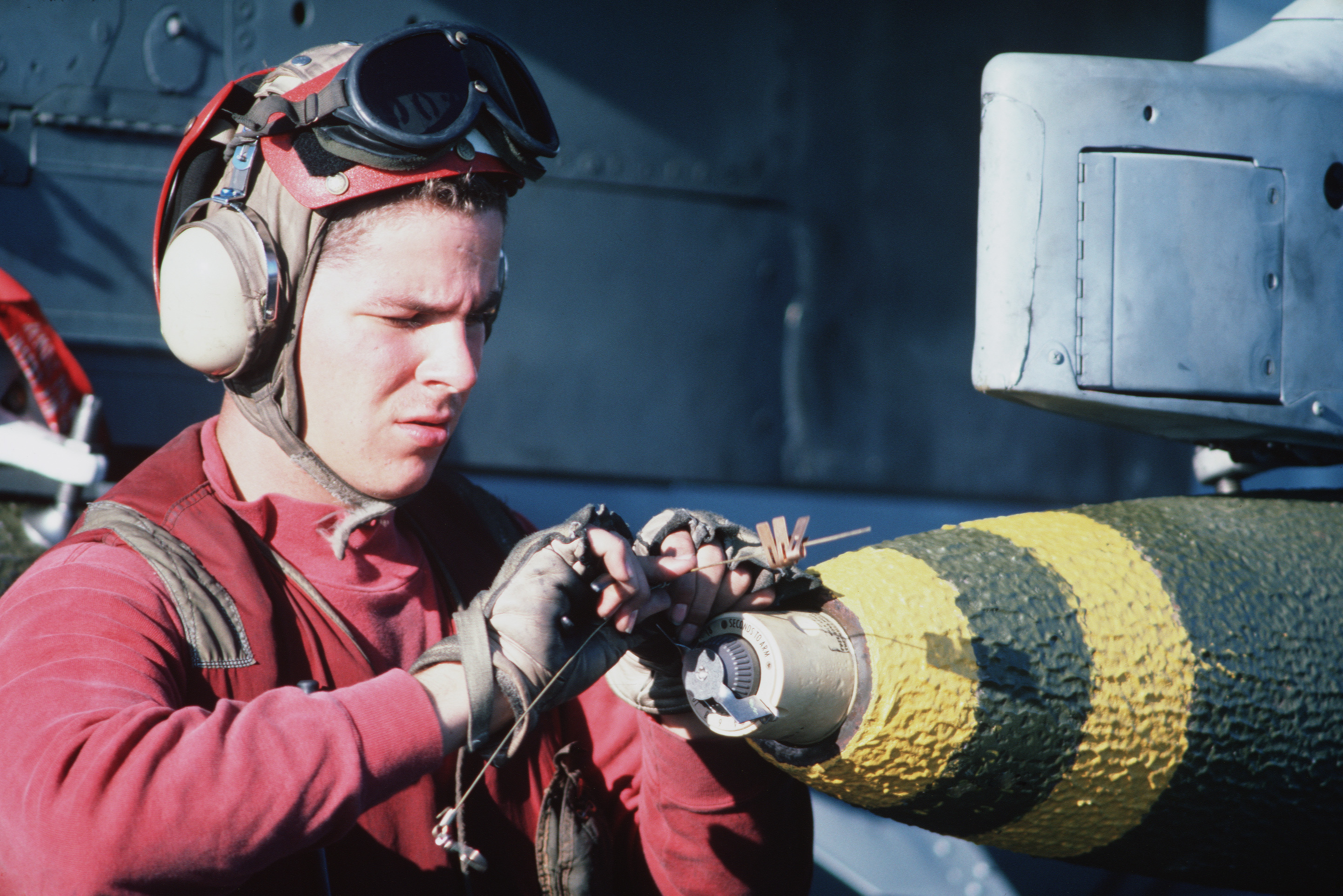
Naval aviation ordnanceman installing arming wire on the nose fuze of a Mark 82 500-pound bomb.

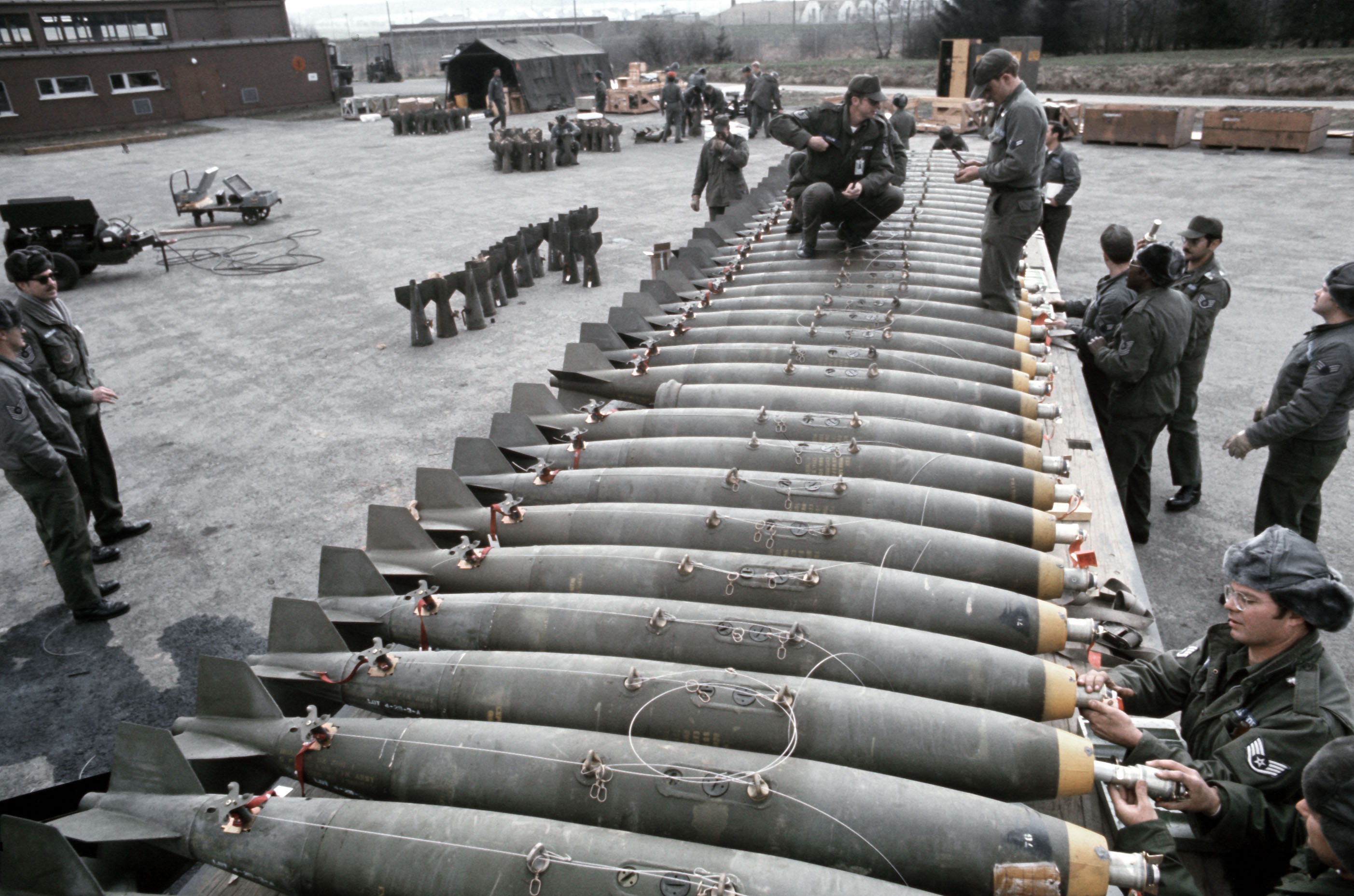
U.S. Air Force weapons personnel from the 50th Tactical Fighter Wing attach release wires to the arming vanes on Mark 82 bomb during exercise Salty Rooster, Hahn Air Base, Germany - 15 April 1978.

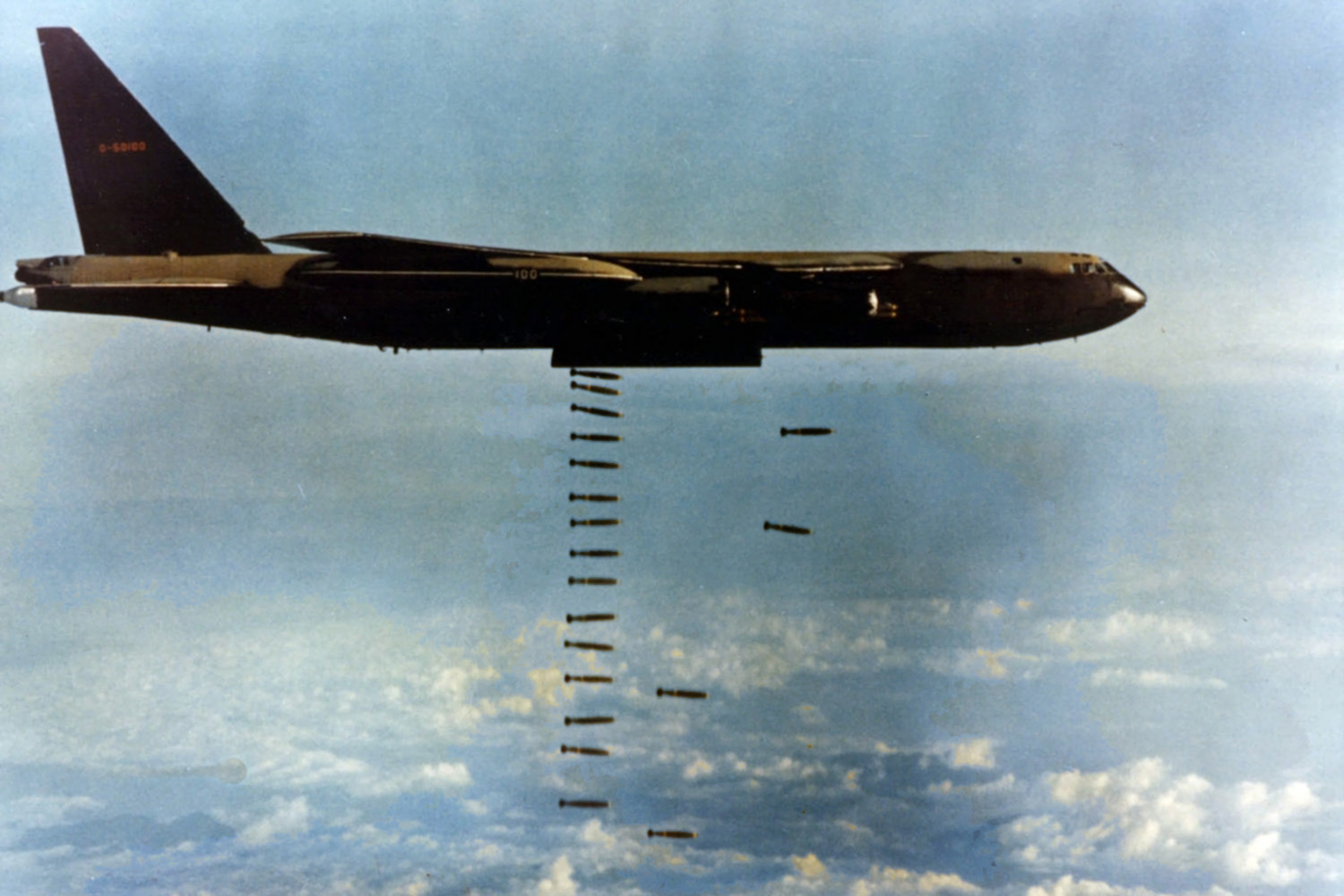
B-52D deploying Mark 82 bombs, Vietnam conflict.

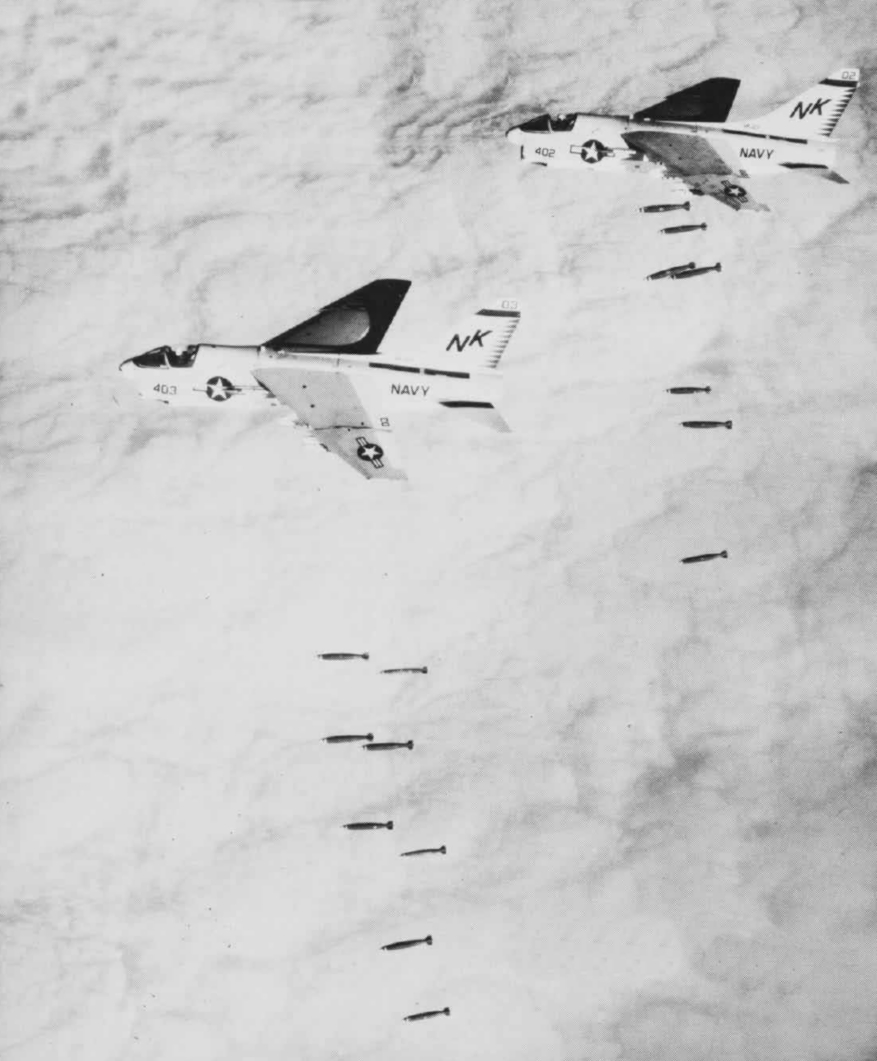
A-7E Corsairs deploying Mark 82 bombs, Vietnam conflict.

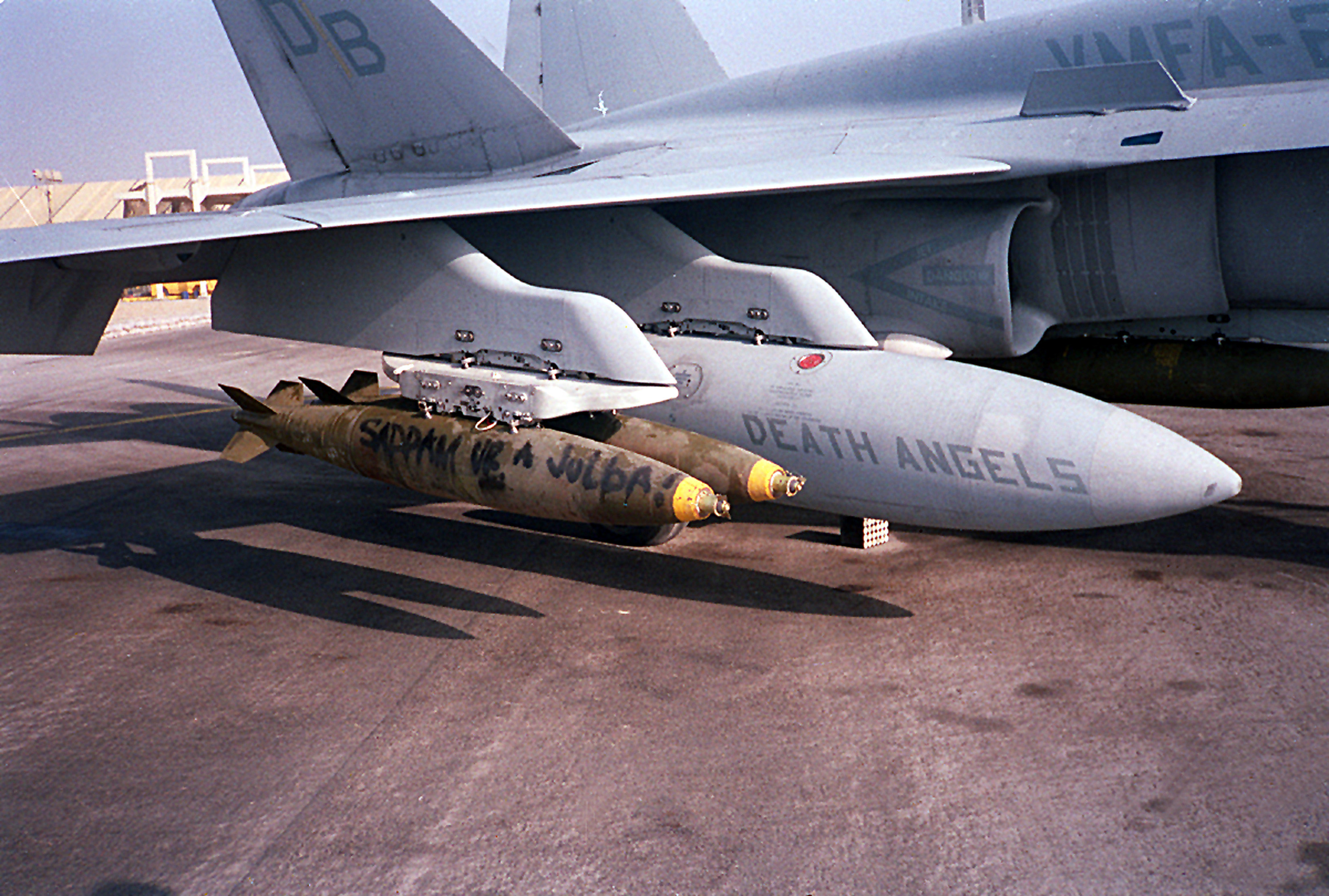
F/A-18C Hornet displaying equipped Mark 82 bombs, Operation Desert Storm.

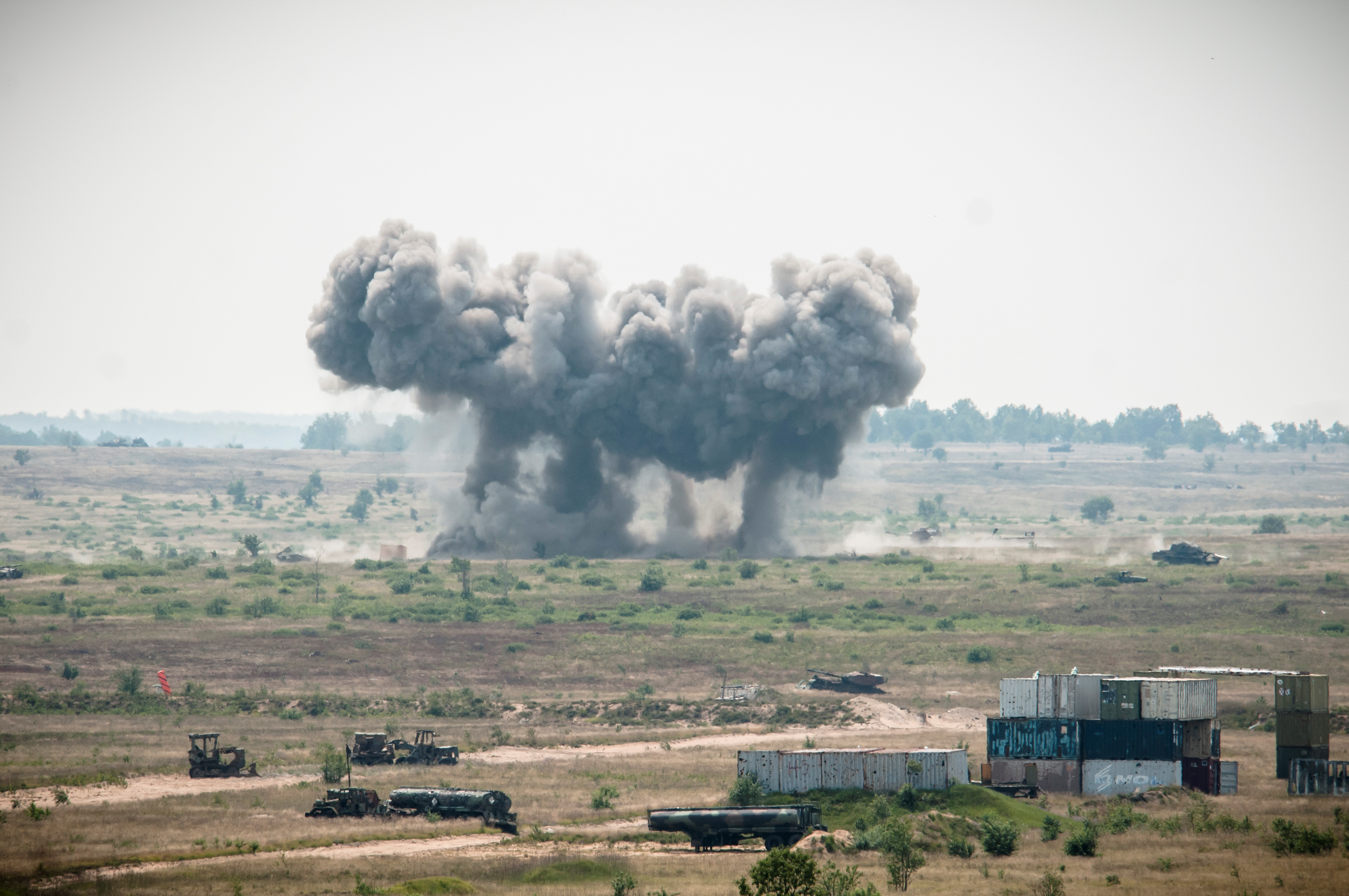
Aftermath of Mark 82 deployments via A-10 Thunderbolt II, Grayling Aerial Gunnery Range.

== See also ==
- Mark 81 bomb
- Mark 83 bomb
- Mark 84 bomb
- Paveway IV
- Armement Air-Sol Modulaire
- FAB-250 – Soviet counterpart
