= BOLT-117 =

First laser-guided aerial bomb

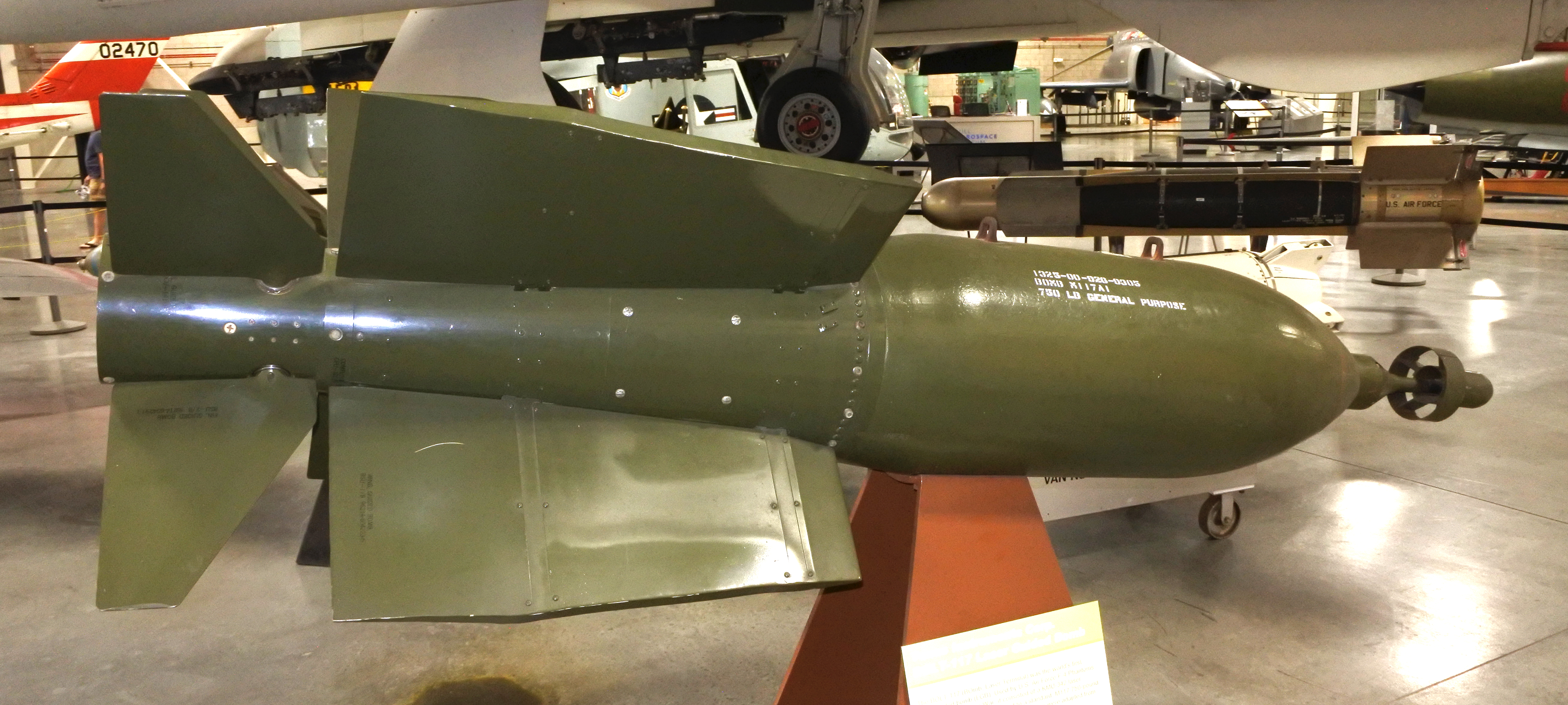
- BOLT-117 on display
- Type: Laser guided bomb
- Place of origin: United States

Service history
- Wars: Southeast Asia War (1961-1973)

Production history
- Designer: Texas Instruments
- Designed: 1967
- Manufacturer: Texas Instruments

Specifications
- Mass: 340 kg (750 lb)
- Effective firing range: 4 km (2.5 mi)

The Texas Instruments BOLT-117 (BOmb, Laser Terminal-117), retrospectively redesignated as the GBU-1/B (Guided Bomb Unit) was the world's first laser-guided bomb (LGB). It consisted of a standard M117 750-pound (340 kg) bomb case with a KMU-342 laser guidance and control kit. This consisted of a gimballed laser seeker on the front of the bomb and tail and control fins to guide the bomb to the target. The latter used the bang-bang method of control where each control surface was either straight or fully deflected. This was inefficient aerodynamically, but reduced costs and minimized demands on the primitive onboard electronics.

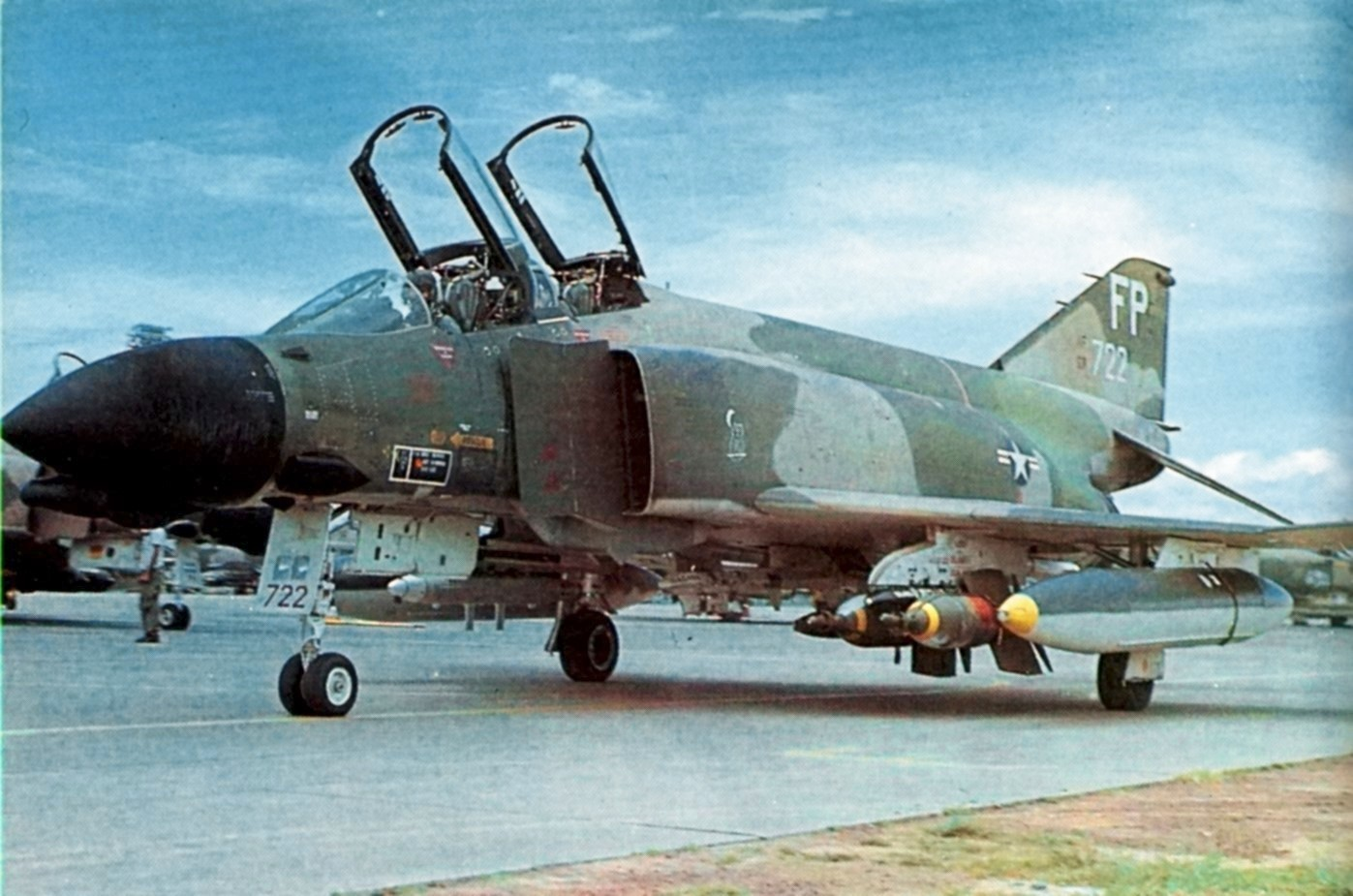
A 497th TFS F-4D with two BOLT-117s at Ubon Royal Thai Air Force Base, 1971.

Originally the project began as a surface-to-air missile seeker developed by Texas Instruments (TI). When TI executive Glenn E. Penisten attempted to sell the new technology to the United States Air Force (USAF), Colonel Joe Davis Jr. inquired if it could instead be used as a ground attack system to overcome problems US aircraft were having with the poor accuracy of bombing in Vietnam. Davis had already witnessed a test of the United States Army's new laser target designator made by Martin Marietta, but no seeker existed to make use of the system. Davis had already performed tests from the back seat of an F-4 Phantom II fighter bomber and proved that it was possible to accurately target objects from a moving aircraft. His mock testing proved correct, and during further testing with live seekers, it took just six attempts to improve the seeker accuracy from 148 feet (45 m) to within 10 feet (3.0 m) of the target. This greatly exceeded the design requirements. It was commissioned by the USAF in 1967.

The BOLT-117 and Paveway I (based on the more streamlined Mk 84 2,000-pound bomb) underwent combat evaluation with the 8th Tactical Fighter Wing in Southeast Asia from May to August 1968. The first combat drop of a laser guided bomb was made using BOLT-117s on 23 May 1968. Without the existence of tracking pods, the Weapon Systems Officer (WSO) in the back seat of an F-4 Phantom II used a hand-held Airborne Laser Designator to guide the bombs, but half of the LGBs still hit their targets despite the difficulties inherent in keeping the laser on the target. Placement of the control surfaces on the rear of the bomb proved to be less than ideal as it limited the ability of the fins to control the bomb's trajectory. In the combat evaluations the BOLT-117 achieved a circular error probability (CEP) of 75 feet (23 m) while the Paveway I achieved a CEP of 20 feet (6.1 m) with one in every four bombs scoring a direct hit. Only a limited number of BOLT-117 bombs were produced before it was discontinued in favor of the more accurate Paveway I family of guidance kits that moved the control fins to the front of the bomb. The Paveway variant was very successful and over 28,000 Paveway weapons were dropped during the war in Vietnam.

The impact of the BOLT-117 on aerial warfare was revolutionary, allowing the destruction of targets even other existing precision weapons had difficulty destroying due to having small warheads and difficulty tracking certain types of objects. Earlier electro-optical weapons such as the AGM-62 Walleye could accurately strike targets with small outlines and good contrast on camera but had difficulty hitting large oddly shaped structures like bridges. Laser-guided weapons allowed far greater precision against these types of targets, and with much larger warheads.

Another equally important improvement was the ability to use add-on guidance kits to turn standard "dumb" ordnance into precision-guided munition yielding a considerable increase in effectiveness compared with free-falling, unguided bombs, and doing so at a fraction of the cost of other guided weapons. The cost of the add-on kits was only a few percent of the original $100,000 price goal.

== Design ==
The BOLT-117 featured a KMU-342 laser guidance and control kit attached to M117 750-pound bomb. The guidance system and control fins were adapted from the AGM-45 Shrike missile. The BOLT-117 was discontinued in favor of the more powerful 2,000 pounds (910 kg) GBU-10 Paveway.
