= Laser-guided bomb =

Type of guided bomb

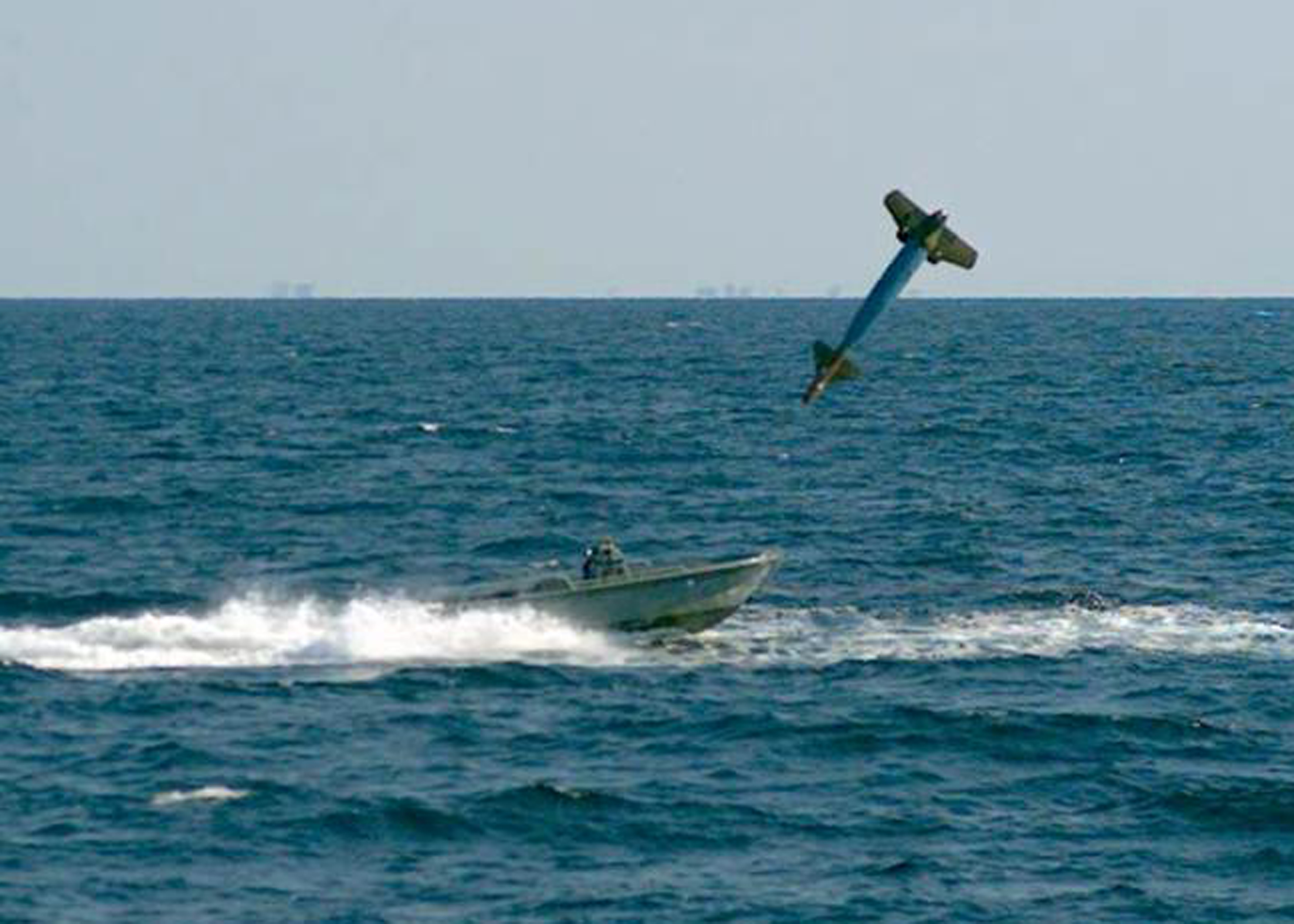
A GBU-10 shortly before it strikes a small boat during a training exercise

A laser-guided bomb (LGB) is a guided bomb that uses semi-active laser guidance to strike a designated target with greater accuracy than an unguided bomb. First developed by the United States during the Vietnam War, laser-guided bombs quickly proved their value in precision strikes of difficult point targets. These weapons use on-board electronics to track targets that are designated by laser, typically in the infrared spectrum, and adjust their glide path to accurately strike the target. Since the weapon is tracking a light signature, not the object itself, the target must be illuminated from a separate source, either by ground forces, by a pod on the attacking aircraft, or by a separate support aircraft.

Data from the 28,000 laser guided bombs dropped in Vietnam showed that laser-guided bombs achieved direct hits nearly 50% of the time, despite the laser having to be aimed out the side window of the back seat of another aircraft in flight. Unguided bombs had an accuracy rate of just 5.5% per mission, which usually included large numbers of the munitions. Because of this dramatically higher precision, laser-guided munitions can carry less explosive and cause less collateral damage than unguided munitions. Today, laser-guided bombs are one of the most common and widespread guided bombs, used by many of the world's air forces.

== Development ==
Laser-guided weapons (LGW) were first developed in the United States in the early 1960s. The United States Air Force (USAF) issued the first development contracts in 1964, leading to the development of the Paveway series, which was used operationally in the Vietnam War starting in 1968.

Originally the project began as a surface-to-air missile seeker developed by Texas Instruments. When TI executive Glenn E. Penisten attempted to sell the new technology to the Air Force, Col. Joe Davis Jr. inquired if it could instead be used as a ground attack system to overcome problems US aircraft were having with the accuracy of bombing in Vietnam. Davis had already witnessed a test of the Army's new laser target designator made by Martin Marietta, but no seeker existed to make use of the system. Davis had already performed tests from the back seat of an F-4 Phantom and proved that it was possible to accurately target objects from a moving aircraft. His mock testing proved correct, and during further testing with live seekers, it took just six attempts to improve the seeker's accuracy from 148 feet (45 m) to within 10 feet (3.0 m) of the target. This greatly exceeded the design requirements. It was commissioned by the USAF in 1967 and two different types, the BOLT-117, and the Paveway I completed a combat evaluation in Vietnam from May to August 1968. Without the existence of tracking pods the Weapon Systems Officer (WSO) in the back seat of an F-4 Phantom II fighter bomber used a hand-held Airborne Laser Designator to guide the bombs, but half of the LGBs still hit their targets despite the difficulties inherent in keeping the laser on the target. LGBs proved to offer a much higher degree of accuracy than unguided weapons but without the expense, complexity, and limitations of guided air-to-ground missiles like the AGM-12 Bullpup. The LGB proved particularly effective against difficult fixed targets like bridges, which previously had required huge loads of "dumb" ordnance to destroy.

It was determined that 48% of Paveways dropped during 1972–73 around Hanoi and Haiphong achieved direct hits, compared with only 5.5% of unguided bombs dropped on the same area a few years earlier. The average Paveway landed within 23 feet (7.0 m) of its target, as opposed to 447 feet (136 m) for gravity bombs. The leap in accuracy brought about primarily by laser guidance made it possible to take out heavily defended, point objectives that had eluded earlier air raids.

The most dramatic example was the Thanh Hoa Bridge, 70 miles (110 km) south of Hanoi, a critical crossing point over the Red River. Starting in 1965, U.S. pilots had flown 871 sorties against it, losing 11 planes without managing to put it out of commission. In 1972 the “Dragon’s Jaw” bridge was attacked with Paveway bombs, and 14 jets managed to do what the previous 871 had not: drop the span and cut a critical North Vietnamese supply artery.

In the wake of this success, other nations, specifically the Soviet Union, France, and Great Britain began developing similar weapons in the late 1960s and early 1970s, while US weapons were refined based on combat experience. In October 2010, India developed its first Sudarshan laser-guided bomb with the help of IRDE, a lab of DRDO.

The USAF and other air forces are now seeking to upgrade their LGBs with GPS guidance as a backup. These weapons, such as the USAF Enhanced Guided Bomb Unit (part of the Paveway family), use laser designation for precision attacks but contain an inertial navigation system with a GPS receiver for backup so that if the target illumination is lost or broken, the weapon will continue to home in on the GPS coordinates of the original target.

== See also ==
- Bombe Guidée Laser
- Joint Direct Attack Munition
- KAB-500L
- List of laser articles
- Semi-active radar homing
- Missile guidance
