= PAVE =

United States military electronic system program

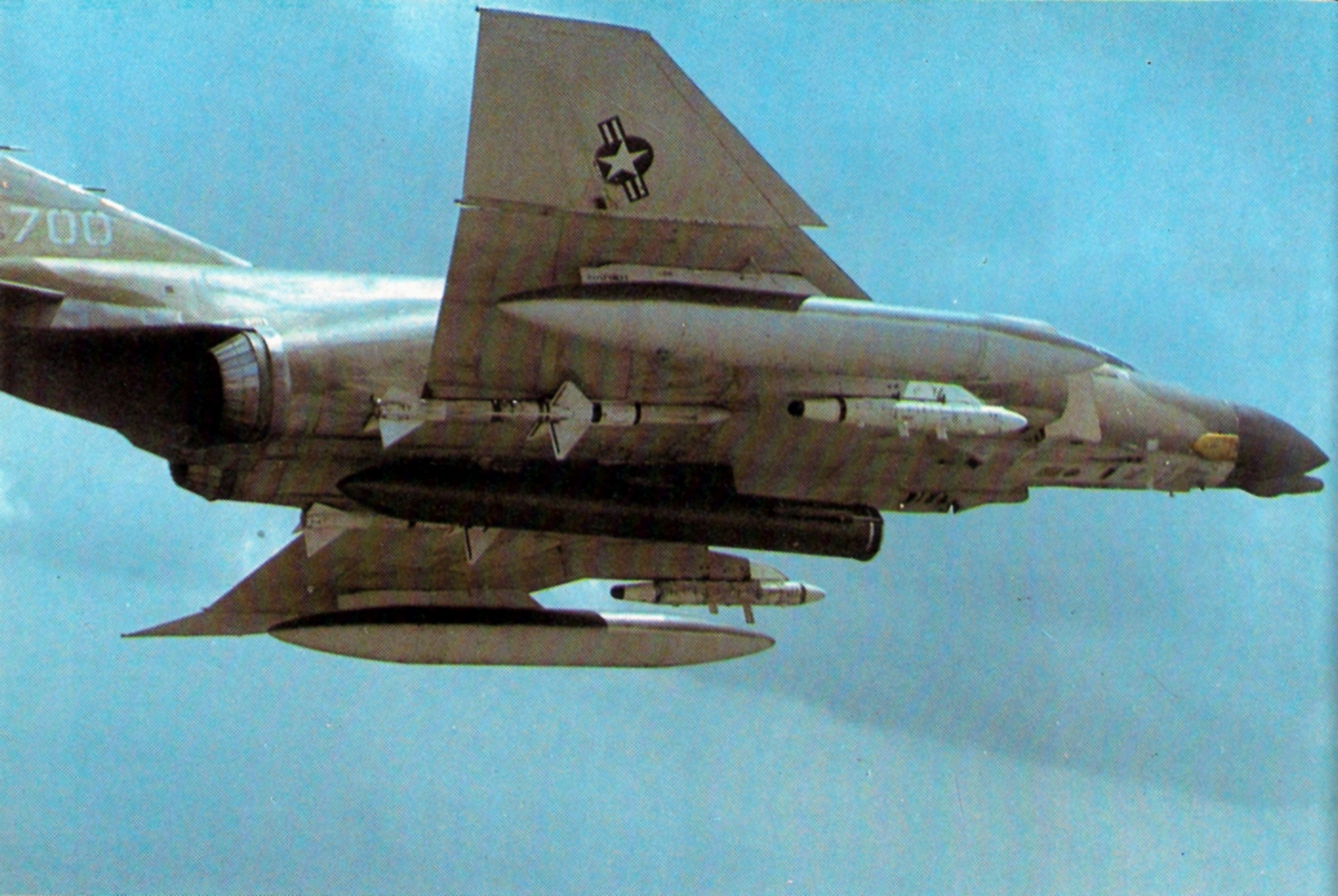
An early Pave Sword laser pod on a F-4D during the Vietnam War, 1971.

PAVE is a United States Air Force program identifier relating to electronic systems. Prior to 1979, Pave was said to be a code word for the Air Force unit responsible for the project. Pave was used as an inconsequential prefix identifier for a wide range of different programs, though backronyms and alternative meanings have been used. For example, in the helicopters Pave Low and Pave Hawk it was said to mean Precision Avionics Vectoring Equipment, but in PAVE PAWS it was said to mean Precision Acquisition Vehicle Entry.

== PAVE systems ==
- Pave Aegis – Refit of AC-130 gunships with a 105mm cannon
- Pave Arrow – Development of AN/AVQ-14 laser tracking pod for use with AN/AVQ-12 Pave Spot laser designator on C-123K Provider and O-2A Skymaster forward air control aircraft
- Pave Buff – Pathfinder bombing operation using two LORAN-C/D AN/ARN-92 receiver equipped B-52D Stratofortress bombers to lead a three-aircraft cell of B-52s to a target in Southeast Asia during the Vietnam War
- Pave Deuce - Program which converted the F-102 into the PQM-102 and QF-102 Full-scale Aerial Targets.
- Pave COIN/Project Little Brother - A USAF program evaluating counter insurgency aircraft during the early 1970s.
- Pave Cricket – Boeing CEM-138 electronic countermeasures mini drone, a CQM-121A Pave Tiger equipped with a jamming system. Program cancelled.
- Pave Hun - Program which converted the F-100 into the QF-100 Full-scale Aerial Target.
- Pave Eagle – Modified Beechcraft Bonanza drone aircraft for low altitude sensor monitoring.
- Pave Fire – Targeting system for "dumb bomb" delivery installed on a single F-4D Phantom II during the Vietnam War
- Pave Gat – Program to develop a laser rangefinder for the B-52G Stratofortress
- Pave Hawk – Sikorsky HH-60 Pave Hawk special operations and combat search and rescue helicopter.
- Pave Knife – Ford Aerospace AN/AVQ-10 early laser targeting pod.
- Pave Lance – Program to replace the Pave Knife AN/AVQ-10 adding forward looking infrared (FLIR) capability in place of low light level television (LLLTV), but Pave Tack development of AN/AVQ-26 took priority
- Pave Light – Development of a stabilized laser designator, the AN/AVQ-9, for F-4 Phantom II aircraft
- Pave Low – Sikorsky MH-53 Pave Low special ops and combat search and rescue helicopter.
- Pave Mack – Laser seeker head development program for air-to-surface missiles, also referred to as LARS (Laser Aided Rocket System) for use with the AN/AVQ-12 Pave Spot laser designator
- Pave Mint – Upgrade of the AN/ALQ-117 electronic warfare system to the AN/ALQ-172.
- Pave Mover – Demonstration program to develop the AN/APY-7 radar wide-area surveillance, ground moving target indicator (GMTI), fixed target indicator (FTI) target classification, and synthetic aperture radar (SAR) for the E-8 Joint STARS.
- Pave Nail - AN/AVQ-13 stabilized periscopic laser designator aboard North American Rockwell OV-10 Bronco with AN/AVQ-12 Pave Spot target laser designator pod.
- Pave Onyx – Vietnam era Advanced Location Strike System c.1973.
- Pave Pace – A fully integrated avionics architecture featuring functional resource allocation.
- PAVE PAWS – The Phased-Array Warning System which replaced the three BMEWS radars. Pave in this case is a backronym for Perimeter or Precision Acquisition Vehicle Entry.
- Pave Penny – Lockheed-Martin AN/AAS-35(V) laser spot tracker.
- Pave Pepper – An Air Force Space and Missile Systems Organization project to decrease the size of the Minuteman III warheads allowing more to be launched by one missile.
- Pave Phantom – Long Range Navigation (LORAN-D) AN/ARN-92 and computer added to F-4D Phantom II storing information for 8 different targets designated by the OV-10 Bronco with the Pave Nail AN/AVQ-13 designator
- Pave Pillar – Generic core avionics architecture system for combat aircraft.
- Pave Pointer – C-123K Provider palletized laser designator/rangefinder/low light level television system used as a Gun Direction Platform
- Pave Prism – Infrared and active laser seekers development for use on the AIM-132 air-to-air missile
- Pave Pronto – Lockheed AC-130 Spectre gunship program adding a night observation camera, AN/AAD-4 or AN/AAD-6 FLIR, and AN/AVQ-17 illuminator.
- Pave Scope – Development of target acquisition aids like TISEO and the Honeywell AN/AVG-8 Eagle Eye Visual Target Acquisition Set (VTAS) helmet sighting system
- Pave Spectre – Lockheed AC-130E gunships.
- Pave Spike – Westinghouse AN/ASQ-153, AN/AVQ-23 electro-optical laser designator pod.
- Pave Spot – AN/AVQ-12 stabilized periscopic night vision sight laser designator pod developed for use on the O-2A Skymaster
- Pave Sword – AN/AVQ-11 laser tracker for F-4 Phantom II aircraft.
- Pave Tack – Ford Aerospace AN/AVQ-26 electro-optical targeting pod, first used on F-4 Phantom II and later on F-111F Aardvark aircraft.
- Pave Tiger – Boeing designed drone (CQM-121A) for Suppression of Enemy Air Defenses. CGM-121B was code named Seek Spinner.
- Pave Way – Project to develop a series of laser-guided bombs developed by Texas Instruments

== See also ==
- Light Airborne Multi-Purpose System (LAMPS)
- LANTIRN
