= Aeronutronic =

Aeronutronic was a defense related division of Ford Aerospace, owned by Ford Motor Company, and based in Newport Beach, Orange County, California.

The 99 acres (40 ha) Engineering and Research Center campus was located on Jamboree Road at Ford Road, overlooking Balboa Bay and the Santa Catalina Strait of the Pacific Ocean in Newport Beach. The facility's master plan and main buildings were designed by Modernist architect William Pereira in 1958.

== History ==
The company was established in 1956 as Aeronutronic Systems, Inc.

The company provided major support for the development of Project Space Track (1957-1961).

== Philco Aeronutronic ==
In 1961, Ford purchased Philco and merged the two companies into Philco Aeronutronic in 1963. It became NASA's primary communications equipment vendor during the 1960s, also building the consoles in the Manned Spacecraft Center in Houston.

Its Space Systems division in Palo Alto built satellites, ground stations, and sophisticated tracking and control systems for the military. In 1988, the unit received a contract to build the next generation of Intelsat communications satellites.

In 1978, Ford received its first contract for a prototype of an Army air defense gun system, the Sergeant York Gun. After persistent technical problems and some $1.3 billion in development costs, in 1985 Defense Secretary Caspar W. Weinberger canceled the program. Around 1,300 Aeronutronic workers were laid off as a result.

Many portions of the Philco side of the company were sold off in the early 1970s. By 1975, all that was left was the original Aeronutronic divisions. These were renamed Ford Aerospace and Communications Corporation in December 1976, and then Ford Aerospace Corporation in January 1988.

== Space Systems/Loral ==
In October 1990, Ford Aerospace and Aeronutronic defense plant were sold by Ford Motor Company to Loral to become Space Systems/Loral.

In 1996, the Loral Space & Communications defense electronics and system integration businesses were acquired by Lockheed Martin.

The Newport Beach plant was demolished, and rezoned for residential development.

== Products ==
- AGM-88 HARM (subcontractor)
- AIM-9 Sidewinder
- AN/AAS-38 (F/A-18 FLIR)
- Have Dash
- LGM-118 Peacekeeper (subcontractor)
- LGM-30 Minuteman (subcontractor)
- MGM-51 Shillelagh
- MIM-72 Chaparral
- Pave Knife
- Pave Tack
- UGM-73 Poseidon (subcontractor)
- Trident (missile) (subcontractor)
