= Pave Penny =

Military aircraft passive infrared targeting system

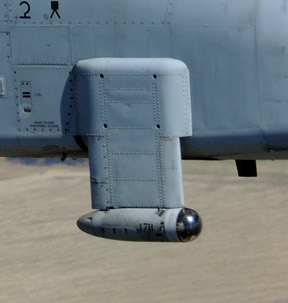
An A-10 Thunderbolt II's Pave Penny pod.

The Lockheed Martin AN/AAS-35(V) Pave Penny is a laser spot tracker carried by US Air Force attack aircraft and fighter-bombers enabling them to track a laser spot on the ground. It is a receiver only, allowing the pilot to see which targets are marked by a laser designator.

Pave Penny does not produce a laser beam and cannot be used to designate targets, designed for use with laser designators on the ground or on other aircraft. PAVE was later used as an backronym meaning Precision Avionics Vectoring Equipment.

== Description ==
Developed in the mid-1970s, Pave Penny was based on the earlier AN/AVQ-11 Pave Sword laser tracker used on USAF F-4 Phantom IIs during the Vietnam War, miniaturized using solid-state electronics.

The compact 31 in (79 cm) pod weighing only 32 lb (15 kg) is a simple laser spot tracker that searches for reflected laser light from other laser designators (used by friendly air or ground forces) and displays that target information on the aircraft head-up display (HUD). Unlike the laser ranger and marked target seeker systems common to European aircraft, or the more sophisticated AN/ASQ-228 ATFLIR, TIALD, and LANTIRN designators, Pave Penny does not contain a laser. It can recognize specific laser designation signals based on pre-determined four-digit codes encoded into the laser pulse, allowing it to seek out particular targets and ignore others (to avoid, for example, several aircraft hitting the same target). There is no range-finding capability. The Pave Penny's nominal range is 20 mi (32 km), although effective range is considerably shorter.

The Pave Penny pod was used by USAF A-7D Corsair II aircraft, fuselage-mounted beneath the engine intake, and the A-10 Thunderbolt II, mounted on an external pylon designed specifically for the pod. It was also previously used by some F-16C/D Fighting Falcon aircraft, although most now use the LANTIRN system instead, permitting self-designation. Some Pave Penny pods were also supplied to Singapore, where they were used on A-4SU Super Skyhawks.

== See also ==
- Pave Tack
- Pave Knife
- Pave Spike
- List of military electronics of the United States
