= List of Cold War weapons =

This is a list of weapons built during the Cold War.

== USA ==
=== Weapons ===
Photo	Number Built	Called	Entered/ Retired
N/A	N/A	E14	
	140,000	ENTAC/MGM-32A	
	1982	FGR-17 Viper	
	N/A	GAU-8/A Avenger	
	2,100	M29 Davy Crockett Weapon System	1961/ 1971
	N/A	AIM-9 Sidewinder	
	70,000	AGM-65 Maverick	
	N/A	Northrop AGM-136A Tacit Rainbow	1982 to 1991
		ALQ-131 ECM Pod	

=== Aircraft ===
Photo	Number Built	Called	Entered/ Retired	Role
	692	Avro CF-100 Mk.4A Canuck	1950/ 1981	Fighter
	2,300+	Beechcraft T-34A Mentor	1975–1990	Trainer
	104	Boeing B-1B Lancer	1988/ Present	Bomber
	811	Boeing KC-97L Stratofreighter	1951/ 1978	
	2,042	Boeing RB-47H Stratojet		Reconnaissance Bomber
	N/A	Boeing WB-50D Superfortress		
	13	Boeing YCGM-121B Seek Spinner		
	1,180	Cessna LC-126		
	1,269	Cessna T-37B Tweet		Trainer
	230	Cessna T-41A Mescalero		Trainer
	384	Convair B-36J Peacemaker		Bomber
	116	Convair B-58A Hustler		Jet Bomber
	1,000	Convair F-102A Delta Dagger	1953/ 1979	Interceptor
	277	Convair F-106A Delta Dart	1956/ 1998	Interceptor
	50	Douglas C-133A Cargo Master	1956/ 1971	
	5,195	F-4D Phantom II		
	4,604	F-16	1973–2017	Fighter
	563	FB-111A		
	716	Fairchild Republic A-10A Thunderbolt II		
	N/A	Lockheed AC-130A Spectre		
	38	Lockheed D-21B	1964/ 1971	
	855	Lockheed F-94C Starfire		Interceptor
	2,578	Lockheed F-104C Starfighter		supersonic superiority fighter
	59	Lockheed F-117A Nighthawk		
	32	Lockheed SR-71A		
	6,557	Lockheed T-33A Shooting Star		Trainer
	104	Lockheed U-2A		
	1,198	McDonnell Douglas F-15C		Fighter
	1,189	Northrop AT-38B Talon		Trainer

=== Tanks ===
Photo	Number built	Called	Entered/ Retired	Role
	4,731	M24 Chaffee	April 1944–August 1945	Light tank
	5,467	M41 Walker Bulldog	1951–1954	Light tank
	2 prototypes	T92	1956–1958	Light tank
	1,662	M551 Sheridan	1966–1970	Amphibious light tank
	1,160	M46 Patton	1949–195	Medium tank
	300	M103 heavy tank	1957–1974	Heavy tank
	15,000	M60	1960–1983	Main battle tank
	10,300	M1 Abrams	1980–present	Main battle tank

=== Armoured Fighting Vehicles ===
Photo	Number Built	Called	Entered/ Retired	Role
	N/A	M2 Bradley	1981–present	Infantry fighting vehicle

=== Self-propelled Artillery ===
Photo	Number built	Called	Entered/ Retired	Role
	418	M40	1945 – 1953	Self-propelled artillery
	24	M43	1945 – 1953	Self-propelled artillery
	N/A	M55	1952–1960	1952–1960
