= Loral Corporation =

American industrial company

- Native name: Loral Electronics Corporation
- Industry: Defense contracting
- Founded: 1948; 78 years ago in New York City
- Founders: William Lorenz and Leon Alpert
- Defunct: 1996
- Successor: Loral Space & Communications, Lockheed Martin, L-3 Communications
- Area served: United States
- Products: Radar, sonar and infrared detection equipment; satellite communications;

Loral Corporation was a defense contractor founded in 1948 in New York by William Lorenz and Leon Alpert as Loral Electronics Corporation. The company's name was taken from the first syllables of each founder's surname.

== History ==
Loral Corporation originally developed radar and sonar systems for the US Navy. In 1959 it went public with an initial offering of 250,000 shares at $12 each. Part of the proceeds from this offering were used to build a new headquarters on its 10-acre (40,000 m^{2}) site at 825 Bronx River Avenue, in the Soundview section of The Bronx, New York.

In 1959 it began to diversify, buying several smaller companies, through which it won more military contracts. Some purchased companies included Willor Manufacturing Corp., American Beryllium Co., Inc., of Sarasota, Florida, Arco Electronics, and several plastics companies.

In 1961, it formed a division for developing communications, telemetry, and space navigation systems for satellites.

As its expansion increased, it borrowed $15 million from the Massachusetts Mutual Life Insurance Company in 1965.

In the late 1960s, it was awarded many military contracts, including a $3.9 million U.S. Navy contract for Doppler navigation radar in 1965, a $14 million contract from General Dynamics for advanced electronics for the U.S. Air Force F-111 airplane in 1969, and a $3.9 million contract for airborne countermeasures for the RF-4C Phantom II reconnaissance plane. By the late 1960s, Loral specialized in radar receivers, which identified signatures of enemy radar systems on missiles and anti-aircraft guns.

By the late 1960s, Loral's corporate purchases were causing problems for the company. By 1971 it had lost $3 million and was sometimes unable to meet its loan payments. Many acquisitions were not profitable and also not in Loral's primary business. The founders, Lorenz and Alpert, were prepared to sell half their interest in the company.

Loral was on the verge of bankruptcy in 1972 before Bernard L. Schwartz bought 12% of the company and became CEO. Over the next two decades he built it into a major player in the global aerospace and defense industry, acquiring 16 other defense and aerospace companies. In 1995, Loral had $5.5 billion in revenue. In 1996 Loral sold its defense electronics and system integration businesses to Lockheed Martin; its remaining units became Loral Space & Communications. The following year, several of those former Loral units were spun off by Lockheed Martin to become the core of L-3 Communications.

Loral was accused of transferring technology to China in 1996. The incident arose as a result of an investigation into the launch failure of Intelsat 708, a Space Systems/Loral-built satellite. In a 2002 agreement with the State Department and Department of Justice the company agreed to pay $20 million in fines to settle the matter and to improve its compliance procedures. In the agreement Loral officials neither admitted nor denied the government's charges; Loral executives acknowledged "the nature and seriousness of the offenses alleged by the department in the draft charging letter, including the risk of harm to the security and foreign policy interests of the United States", and stated that they wished to make amends through the payment of restitution. Schwartz subsequently released a statement accepting "full responsibility for the matter" and portrayed the incident as an error by a single Loral employee.

== Timeline ==
- 1948 – Loral Electronics Corporation founded
- 1959 – Loral makes a public stock offering and becomes a public corporation
- 1972 – Loral is on the verge of bankruptcy, Bernard L. Schwartz acquires it.
- 1987 – Goodyear Tire and Rubber Company sold Goodyear Aerospace (GAC) to Loral, which became Loral Defense Systems.
- October 1990 – Loral acquires Ford Aerospace, the divisions of which become Space Systems/Loral and Loral Western Development Labs.
- 1991 – With Qualcomm, Loral begins the Globalstar project, and at the peak owns a 42% share in the company.
- 1994 – Loral acquires IBM's Federal Systems Division, which becomes Loral Federal Systems.
- May 5, 1995 – Loral acquires Paramax, the defense unit of Unisys, for $862 million in cash.
- January 8, 1996 – Lockheed Martin agreed to purchase the defense electronics and system integration businesses of Loral for $9.1 billion. Loral becomes Loral Space and Communications.
- October 5, 2007 – Loral Space & Communications Inc. and the Public Pension Investment Board of Canada received the final regulatory approval necessary to complete the acquisition of Telesat from BCE Inc. for CAD $3.25 billion. The acquisition closed on October 31, 2007, with Loral owning 64 percent of Telesat.

== Other acquisitions ==
- Fairchild-Weston
- LTV Missiles
- Solartron

== Other past units ==
- Loral Aeronutronic (Rancho Santa Margarita, California)
- Loral Command Control Systems
- Loral Conic (San Diego, California)
- Loral Defense Systems (Akron, Ohio)
- Loral Instrumentation (San Diego)
- Loral/Liris
- Loral ROLM Mil-Spec Computer Systems (San Jose, California)
- Loral Space Information Systems
- Loral Space & Range Systems (Sunnyvale, California)
- Loral Terracom (San Diego)
- Loral Vought Systems (Grand Prairie, Texas) (now part of Lockheed Martin Missiles and Fire Control)
- Loral Narda
- Loral Randtron
- Loral Western Development Laboratories
- Loral Infrared & Imaging Systems, LIRIS (Lexington, Massachusetts)
- Loral Electro Optical Systems, LEOS (Pasadena, California)
