= Bernard L. Schwartz =

American businessman (1935–2024)

- Born: Bernard Leon Schwartz; December 13, 1925; New York City, U.S.
- Died: March 12, 2024 (aged 98); New York City, U.S.
- Education: City University of New York (BS)
- Occupation: Businessman
- Known for: Chairman and CEO, Loral Space & Communications
- Spouses: Irene Zanderer; Denise Jansen
- Children: 2

Bernard Leon Schwartz (December 13, 1925 – March 12, 2024) was an American businessman who was chairman of the board and CEO of Loral Space & Communications, a position he held for 34 years. He also was chairman and CEO of K&F Industries, Inc., and president and CEO of Globalstar Telecommunications. He retired from Loral and his positions at its various subsidiaries and affiliates as of March 1, 2006. He was latterly the chairman and CEO of BLS Investments, his own investment firm in Manhattan.

== Biography ==
Schwartz was born in Brooklyn, New York. and grew up in the Bensonhurst neighborhood of Brooklyn. He was Jewish. Schwartz graduated from Townsend Harris High School in NYC. He held a B.S. in finance and an honorary doctorate from City University of New York. He was a World War II veteran, having served in the US Army Air Corps. After school, he worked as an accountant eventually becoming a partner at a Wall Street firm. He then went on to be a vice president of American President Lines and then president of Reliance Insurance Co. (formerly Leasco) for four years. In 1972, he bought a 12% stake in Loral Corporation, a New York Stock Exchange-listed manufacturer of satellites and satellite systems, where he was its Chairman and CEO for 34 years.

== Political activities ==
Schwartz was a lifelong Democrat. According to NBC News, he was the largest single contributor to the Democratic Party from 1992 to 1996. In 1996, he celebrated his 71st birthday with Bill and Hillary Clinton at the White House. In 1998 Schwartz became embroiled in a campaign donations scandal and an alleged transfer of missile technology to China that occurred in 1996. He was exonerated of any wrongdoing in the campaign finance matter after a Justice Department investigation. Loral settled the missile transfer matter with the Justice Department in 2002, paying a $14 million fine and admitting no wrongdoing.

In 2016, Schwartz donated US$1 million to Priorities USA Action, a Super PAC supporting Democratic presidential candidate Hillary Clinton. Schwartz is also in the $5 million – $10 million bracket of donors to the Clinton Foundation.

== Foreign policy ==
In 2002, the Bernard L. Schwartz Senior Fellowship in Business and Foreign Policy was established at the Council on Foreign Relations with a gift from the Bernard and Irene Schwartz Foundation. The fellowship was created to focus on the global integration of financial markets and its implications for U.S. economic and foreign policy. Schwartz did not actually become a member of the Council on Foreign Relations until 2003, the following year.

== Personal life ==
Schwartz was married to the former Irene Zanderer and lived in New York City; she died in 2014. They had two daughters. He remarried to Denise Jansen. Schwartz was a member of the United Jewish Appeal Federation's real estate committee. In 2002, he and his wife donated $5 million to Baruch College.

Schwartz died at his home in Manhattan on March 12, 2024, at the age of 98.
