= Loral Space & Communications =

Delaware-domiciled satellite communications company

Loral Space & Communications Inc.
- Company type: Public
- Traded as: Nasdaq: TSAT; Russell 2000 Component
- Industry: Communications, Space manufacturing
- Founded: 1996; 30 years ago
- Headquarters: 600 Third Avenue, New York City, New York, U.S.
- Key people: Michael B. Targoff (CEO); Harvey Rein (SVP/CFO)
- Products: Communications satellite Manufacturing, Satellite Services
- Revenue: $882M USD (FY 2007)
- Number of employees: 21 (2017); 4000 (1998)
- Website: www.loral.com archived

Loral Space & Communications Inc. is a Delaware-domiciled satellite communications company headed by Michael B. Targoff. The company was formed in 1996 from the remnants of Loral Corporation when Loral divested its defense electronics and system integration businesses to Lockheed Martin for $9.1 billion. In 2006, Bernard L. Schwartz retired after leading the company for 34 years.

Loral presently has an investment in Telesat Canada in partnership with the Public Sector Pension Investment Board of Canada, and merged into a new stock offering (TSAT) on the Nasdaq in November, 2020. The company also participates in a number of international and domestic joint ventures, including an ownership stake in XTAR.

== History ==
On March 20, 1998, Loral completed the acquisition of Orion Network Systems, Inc., through the exchange of common stock. The transaction was valued at approximately $479 million.

In January 2002, Loral reached a settlement with the U.S. Government in a case relating to the company’s involvement in the disclosure of information during a review of a Chinese rocket launch failure in 1996. Loral agreed to pay a civil fine of $14 million to the State Department without admitting or denying the government’s charges. According to a House Select Committee, Loral under CEO Schwartz provided the Chinese government with advice regarding a guidance system for future PRC road-mobile intercontinental ballistic missiles. The Defense Technology Security Administration concluded Loral "committed a serious export control violation" and that the "significant benefits derived by China from these activities are likely to lead to improvements in the overall reliability of their launch vehicles [i.e., rockets] and ballistic missiles and in particular their guidance systems." Loral paid a total fine of $20 million, the largest that a company has ever paid under the Arms Export Control Act.

On July 15, 2003, Loral and certain subsidiaries filed voluntary petitions under Chapter 11 of the United States Bankruptcy Code. In conjunction with the filing, Loral announced the sale of its North American satellite fleet to Intelsat to help reduce its debt. Loral emerged from Chapter 11 on November 21, 2005.

On Feb 1, 2006, a subsidiary of Loral Space & Communications (Loral Skynet) began the construction of Telstar 11N, a powerful new multi-region Ku-band communications satellite.

On October 5, 2007, Loral Space & Communications Inc. and the Public Pension Investment Board of Canada received the final regulatory approval necessary to complete the acquisition of Telesat from BCE Inc. for CAD $3.25 billion. The acquisition closed on October 31, 2007. Loral hold a 64% economic interest and a 331/3% voting interest in Telesat Holdco, the ultimate parent company of the resulting new entity.

At the same time, Telesat Canada merged with Loral Skynet, a subsidiary of Loral Space & Communications. This resulted in the transfer of all of the assets of Loral Skynet to Telesat.

On November 2, 2012, Loral Space & Communications Inc. announced the sale of subsidiary Space Systems/Loral (SS/L), to MacDonald Dettwiler.
