= List of McDonnell Douglas F-4 Phantom II variants =

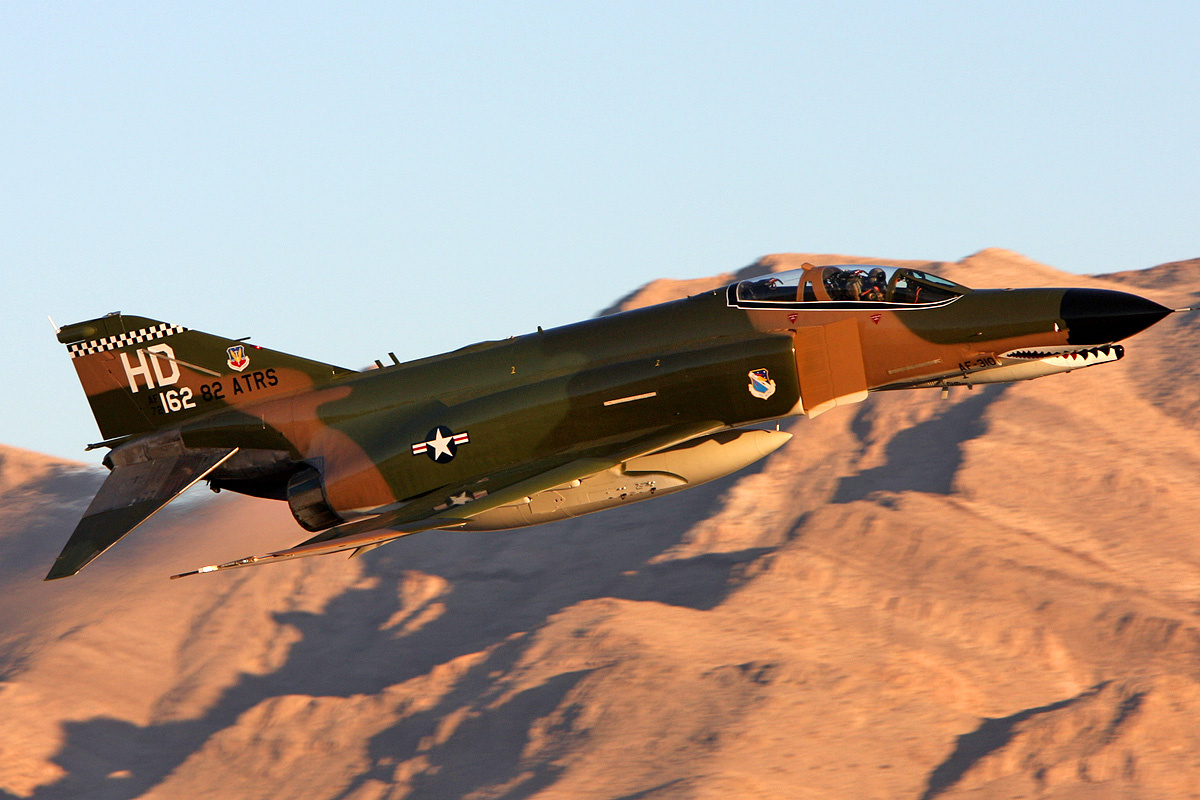
QF-4E Phantom II in flight at Holloman Air Force Base (November 2007)

The numerous variants, versions, and designations of the McDonnell Douglas F-4 Phantom are described below.

== Production numbers for major versions ==
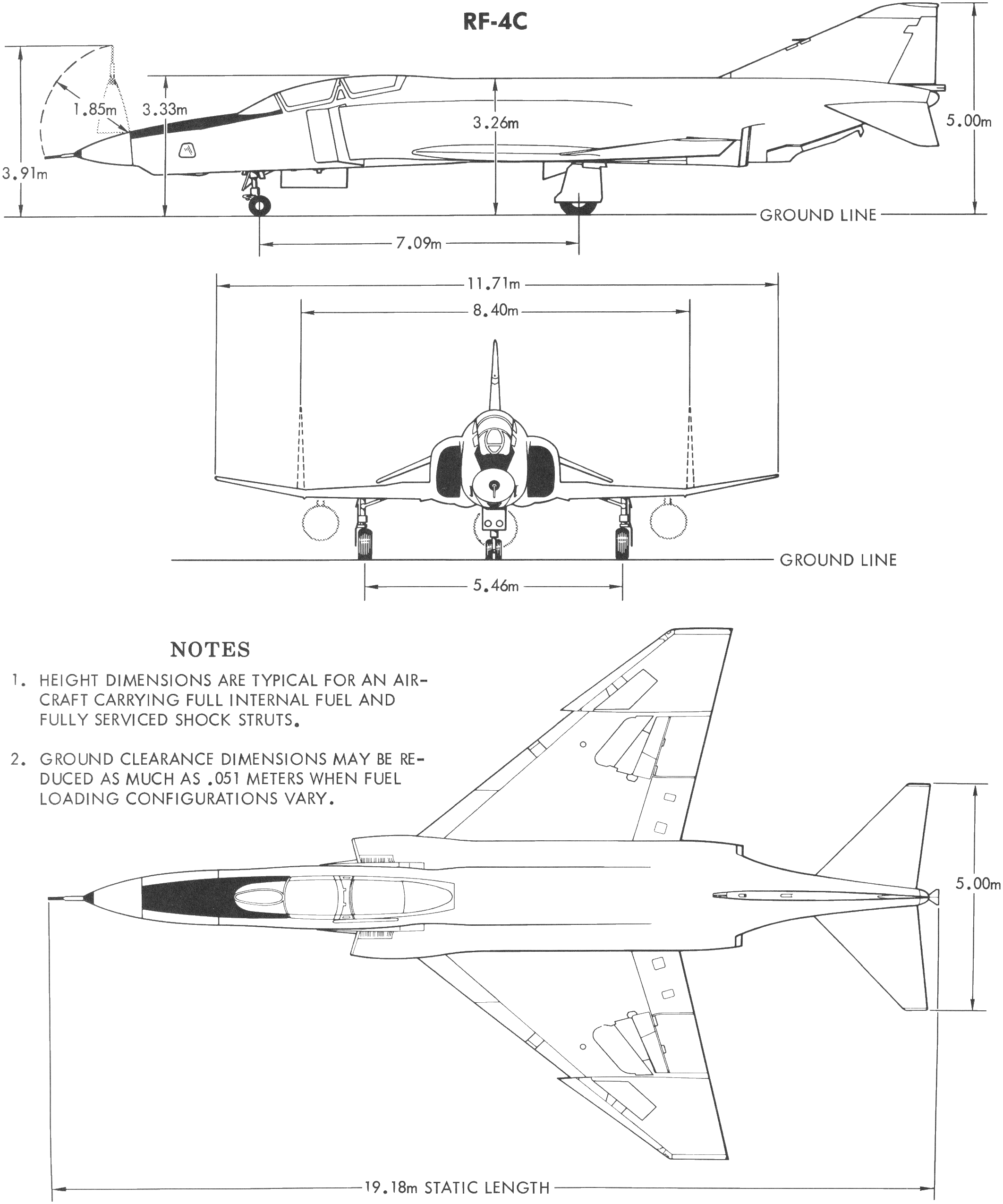
A 3-view line drawing of the RF-4C

Aircraft	Number
F-4A	45
F-4B	649
RF-4B	46
F-4C	583
RF-4C	503
F-4D	825
F-4E	1370
F-4E 2020 (Turkey)	54*
F-4EJ (Japan)	140
RF-4E	149
RF-4EJ (Japan)	15*
F-4F	175
F-4G Wild Weasel	134*
F-4J	522
F-4J Phantom F.3 (RAF)	15*
F-4K Phantom FG.1 (FAA)	50
F-4M Phantom FGR.2 (RAF)	116
F-4N	228*
F-4S	302*

asterisk indicates converted from other version

== Variants ==
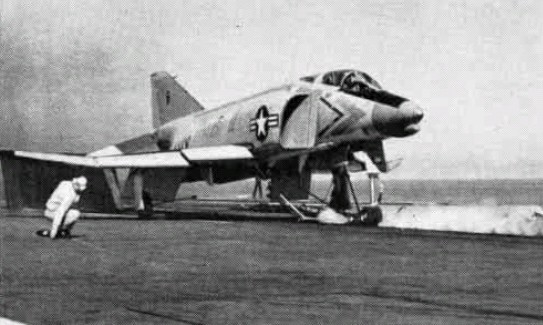
An XF4H-1 1959

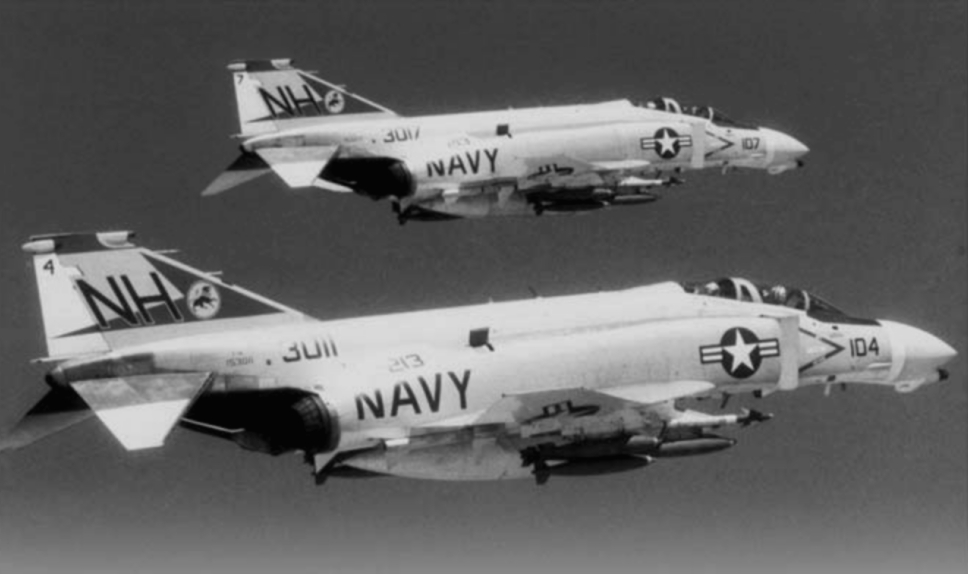
F-4Bs from VF-213, 1967

XF4H-1
Two prototypes for the United States Navy, first flown 1958.
F4H-1F (F-4A)
Two-seat all-weather carrier-based fighter for the U.S. Navy, J79-GE-2 and -2A engines with 16,100 lbf (71.6 kN) of afterburner thrust each. Named Phantom II in 1959 and redesignated F-4A in 1962; 45 built.
TF-4A
A small number of F-4As converted into two-seat training aircraft.
F4H-1 (F-4B)
Two-seat all-weather carrier-based fighter and attack aircraft for the U.S. Navy and Marine Corps. J79-GE-8A or -8B engines with 16,950 lbf (75.4 kN) of afterburner thrust each. Redesignated F-4B in 1962; 649 built.
DF-4B
F-4Bs converted into drone control aircraft.
EF-4B
One F-4B converted into an ECM training aircraft.
NF-4BF
The redesignation of one F-4B for testing purposes.
QF-4B
F-4Bs converted into unmanned supersonic target drones; 25 converted.
F4H-1P (RF-4B)
Tactical reconnaissance version of F-4B for United States Marine Corps, nose stretched 4 ft 9 in (1.45 m), smaller AN/APQ-99 radar. Three camera bays typically carried KS-87 forward oblique/vertical camera on Station 1, KS-76 low-altitude panoramic camera on Station 2, and KA-55A or KA-91 high-altitude panoramic camera on Station 3. Also carried AN/APQ-102 reconnaissance SLAR, AN/AAD-4 infrared reconnaissance system, and ALQ-126 ECM suite. The KS-72 or KS-87 cameras were on rotating mounts and could be aimed in flight which improved upon the earlier RF-4C which could only be aligned on the ground. In 1975, modernized under Project SURE (Sensor Update and Refurbishment Effort); 46 built. Retired in 1990. 4 lost in Vietnam. First flown 12 March 1965.

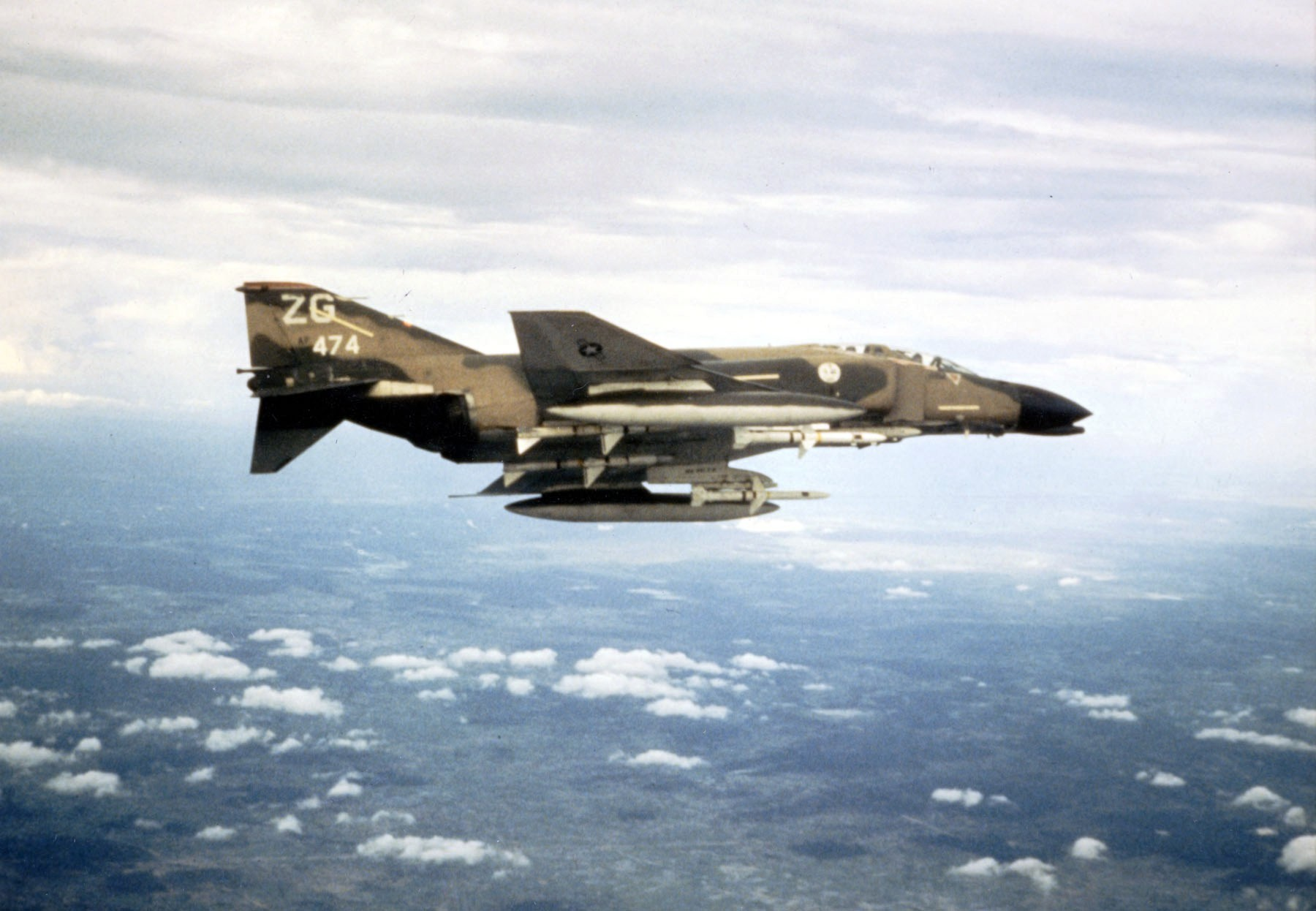
An EF-4C in 1972

F-110A
The original U.S. Air Force designation for the F-4C
F-4C
Two-seat, all-weather tactical fighter, ground-attack version for the United States Air Force; supported a wide spectrum of weapons including AIM-4 Falcon, AGM-12 Bullpup, and nuclear weapons; wider main wheel tires resulted in distinctive wing bulges; J79-GE-15 engines with provision for cartridge start; boom refueling instead of Navy's probe and drogue refueling; AN/APQ-100 radar; duplicated flight controls in the rear cockpit. The aircraft exceeded Mach 2 during its first flight on 27 May 1963; 583 built.
EF-4C Wild Weasel IV
F-4Cs converted into Wild Weasel ECM aircraft. Equipped with AN/APR-25 RHAWS, AN/APR-26 missile launch warning system, ER-142 ECM receiver, and AN/ALQ-119 external ECM pod. Armed with AGM-45 Shrike anti-radiation missiles and cluster bombs but unable to carry the AGM-78 Standard ARM missile. A total of 36 were converted. Many survivors were reverted to the original F-4C configuration.

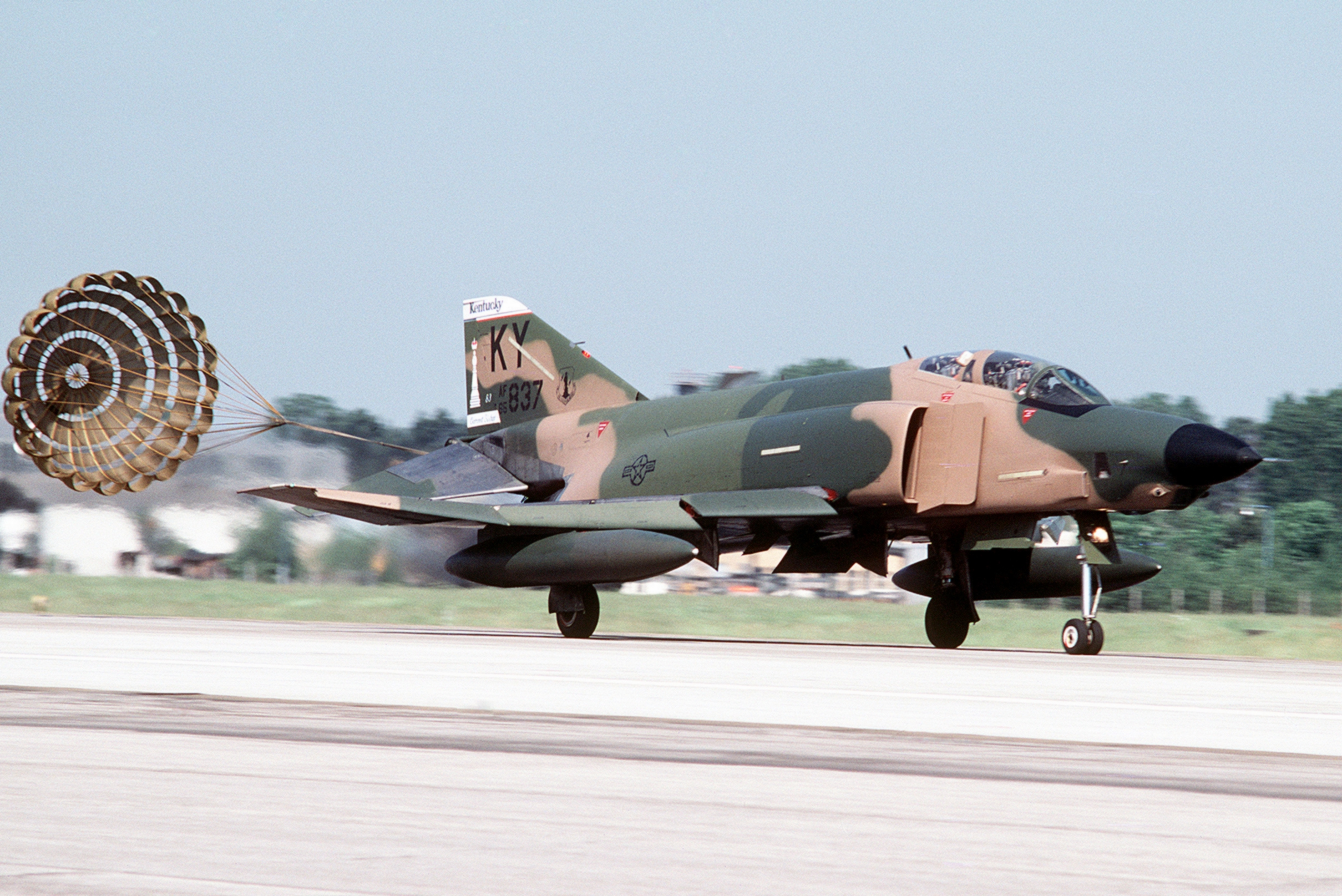
A Kentucky ANG RF-4C showing camera installations and drag chute

RF-4C
All-weather tactical reconnaissance version for the U.S. Air Force, AN/APQ-99 (later AN/APQ-172) radar. Equipped similar to RF-4B but with a wider choice of camera fits, including a centerline pod for the gigantic HIAC-1 LOROP (Long Range Oblique Photography) camera, capable of taking high-resolution images of objects 100 miles (160 km) away. Many aircraft were refitted with a more spacious bulging streamlined nose. A sub-variant, to be designated RF-4C(H) was proposed as a night "hunter" aircraft using infrared equipment instead of cameras under Operation Shed Light. In the end, none were converted. While usually unarmed, RF-4Cs retained the ability to carry a nuclear weapon on the centerline pylon. Additionally, the RF-4Cs of the Alabama Air National Guard, Nevada Air National Guard and Fighter Weapons School were modified to carry the AIM-9 Sidewinder missile. These modernized RF-4Cs of the Alabama and Nevada Air National Guard participated in the Gulf War; 503 built.

Two RF-4Cs shot down by USSR during Project Dark Gene whilst being flown by USAF pilots.
YRF-110A (YRF-4C)
Two prototypes were used in the development of the RF-4C reconnaissance version.

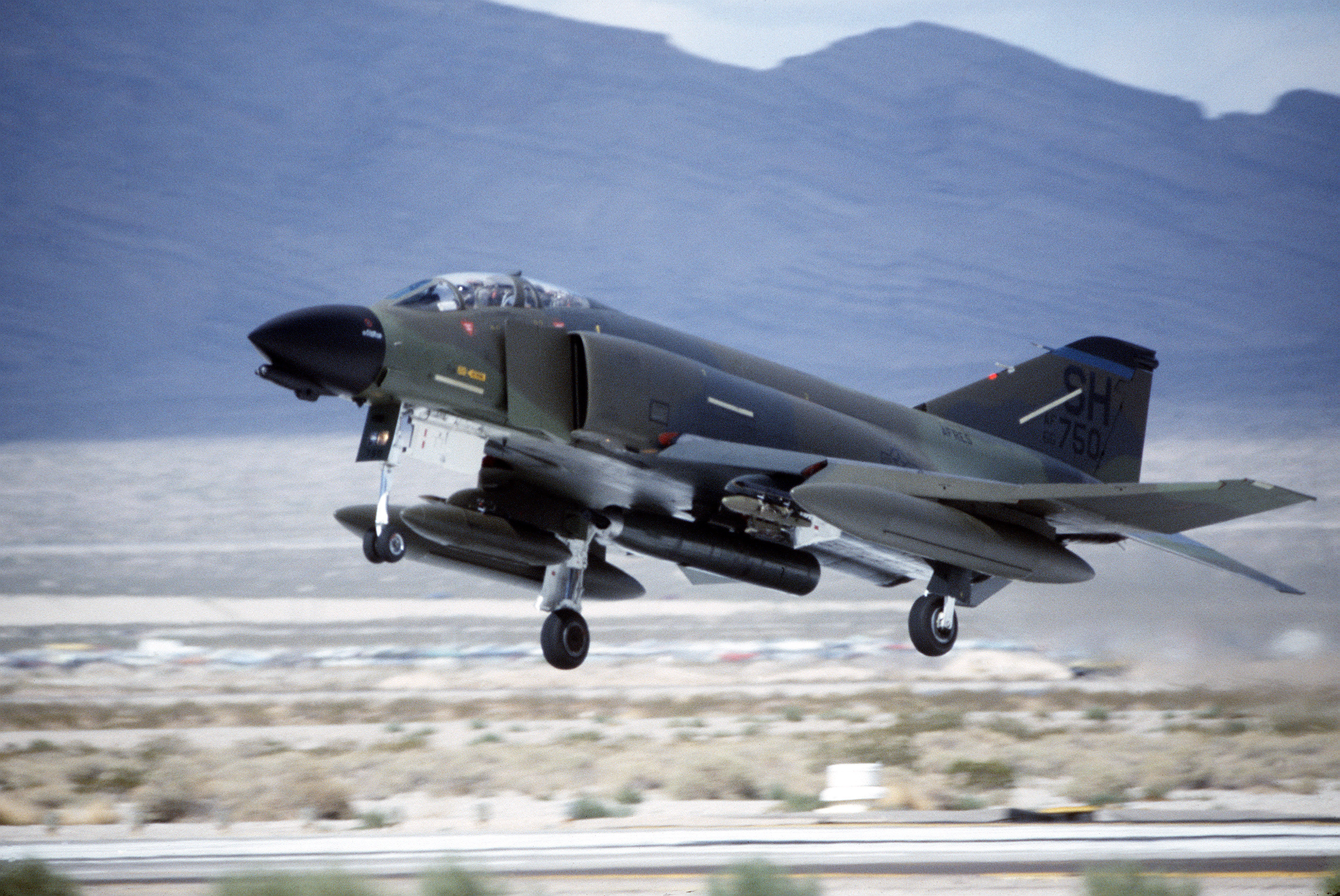
A 301st TFW F-4D, 1985

F-4D
F-4C with updated avionics, AN/APQ-109 radar. First flight June 1965. One USAF pilot and two USAF WSOs became aces in F-4Ds; 825 built.
EF-4D Wild Weasel IV
F-4Ds converted into Wild Weasel ECM aircraft. Unlike the EF-4C, the EF-4D had the capability to use the larger AGM-78 Standard ARM. Only two converted.

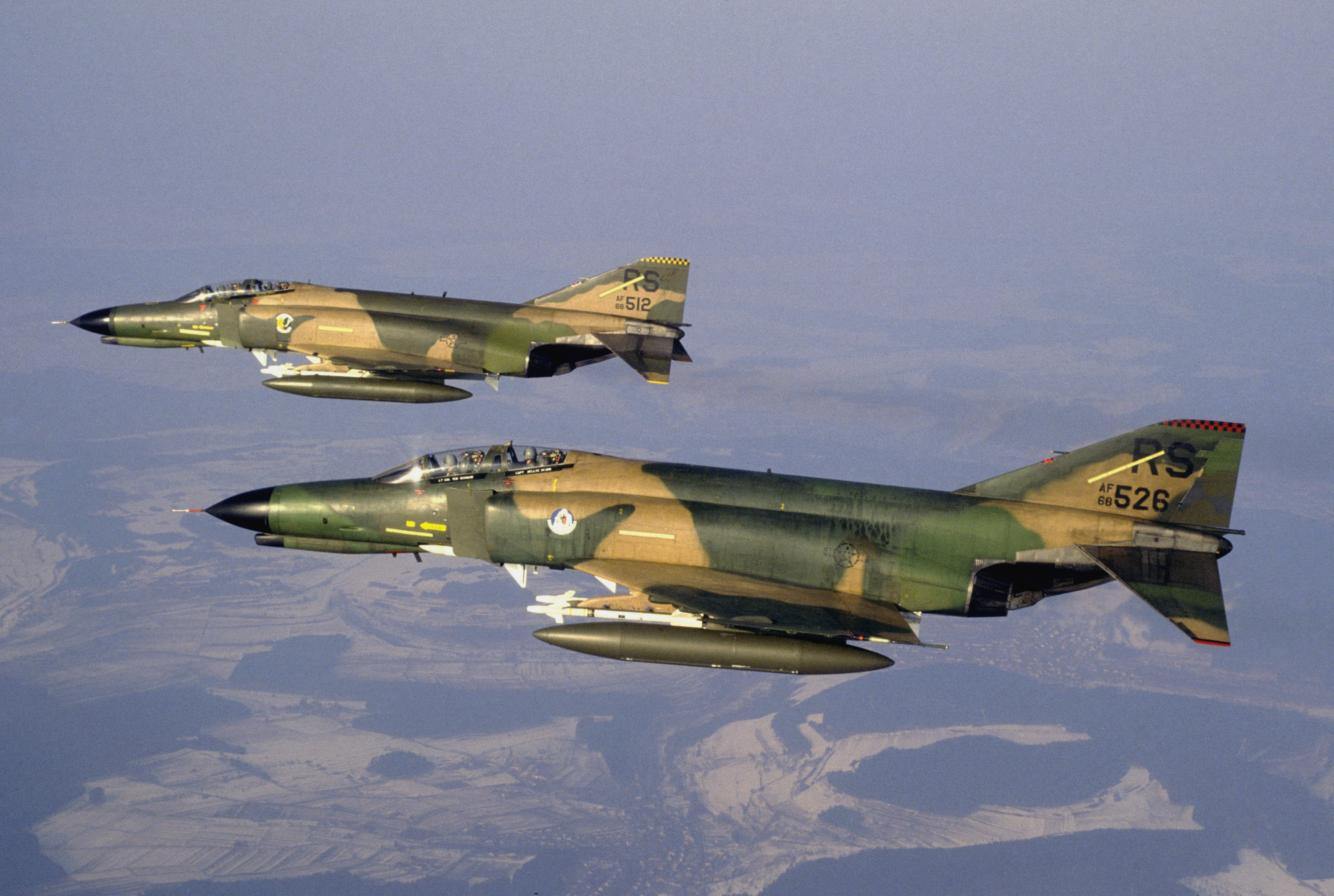
The F-4E introduced the integral 20 mm Vulcan cannon.

F-4E
USAF version with an integral M61 Vulcan cannon in the elongated RF-4C nose, AN/APQ-120 radar with smaller cross-section to accommodate the cannon, J79-GE-17 engines with 17,900 lbf (80 kN) of afterburner thrust each. An additional fuel tank was added at the rear of the fuselage to balance out the Vulcan. Late-series aircraft replaced boundary layer control system with leading-edge slats to improve maneuverability at the expense of top speed under the Agile Eagle program. Starting with Block 53, aircraft added AGM-65 Maverick capability and smokeless J79-GE-17C or -17E engines. First flight 1 August 1965. The most numerous Phantom variant; 1,370 built.
F-4E Kurnass 2000
Modernized Israeli F-4Es, AN/APG-76 radar. Contained new avionics, screens, HUD, wiring, digital communication bus. Support for standoff weapons became standard whereas with F-4Es each weapon required different wiring modifications. Entered service in 1989, retired in 2004.
F-4E Peace Icarus 2000 (AUP)

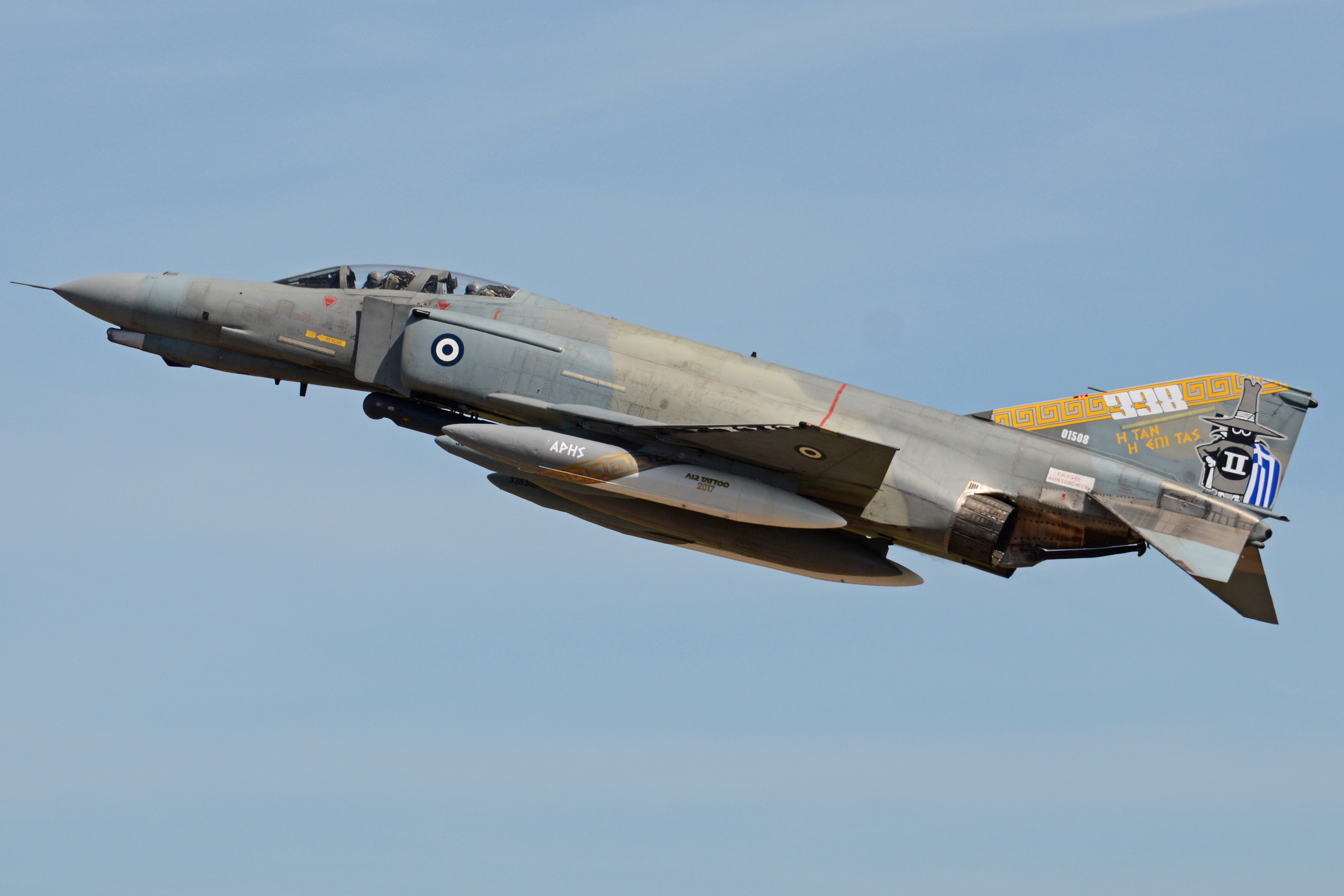
F-4E PI2000(AUP) departing the RIAT 2017 International Air Show, Fairford, UK

In 1998 the Hellenic Air Force decided, in collaboration with the German Aerospace Industry (DASA) and the Hellenic Aerospace Industry (HAI/EAB), to upgrade 39 F-4E Phantom II fighters. The first aircraft was delivered at Andravida Air Base in December 2002. All upgraded F-4s were equipped with the new AN/APQ-65YG radar similar to that of the F/A-18 Hornet, a new onboard Mission Control Computer (MCC), a Head Up Display, the IFF Interrogator, Multi Function Displays and were also capable of carrying a variety of advanced Air-to-Air and Air-to-Ground missiles. These included the AIM-120 AMRAAM (although only the -B edition), the AIM-9M missile, the AFDS and the entire family of the Paveway (I, II and III) laser-guided bombs. Although gradual retirement of F-4 units started in 2017, a number of aircraft are still operational in multi-role missions with the 338 Squadron ”Ares” based at Andravida Air Base. The F-4E Phantom II PI2000 (AUP) has also been certified for use of GBU-27 Paveway III laser-guided bombs.
F-4E Terminator 2020

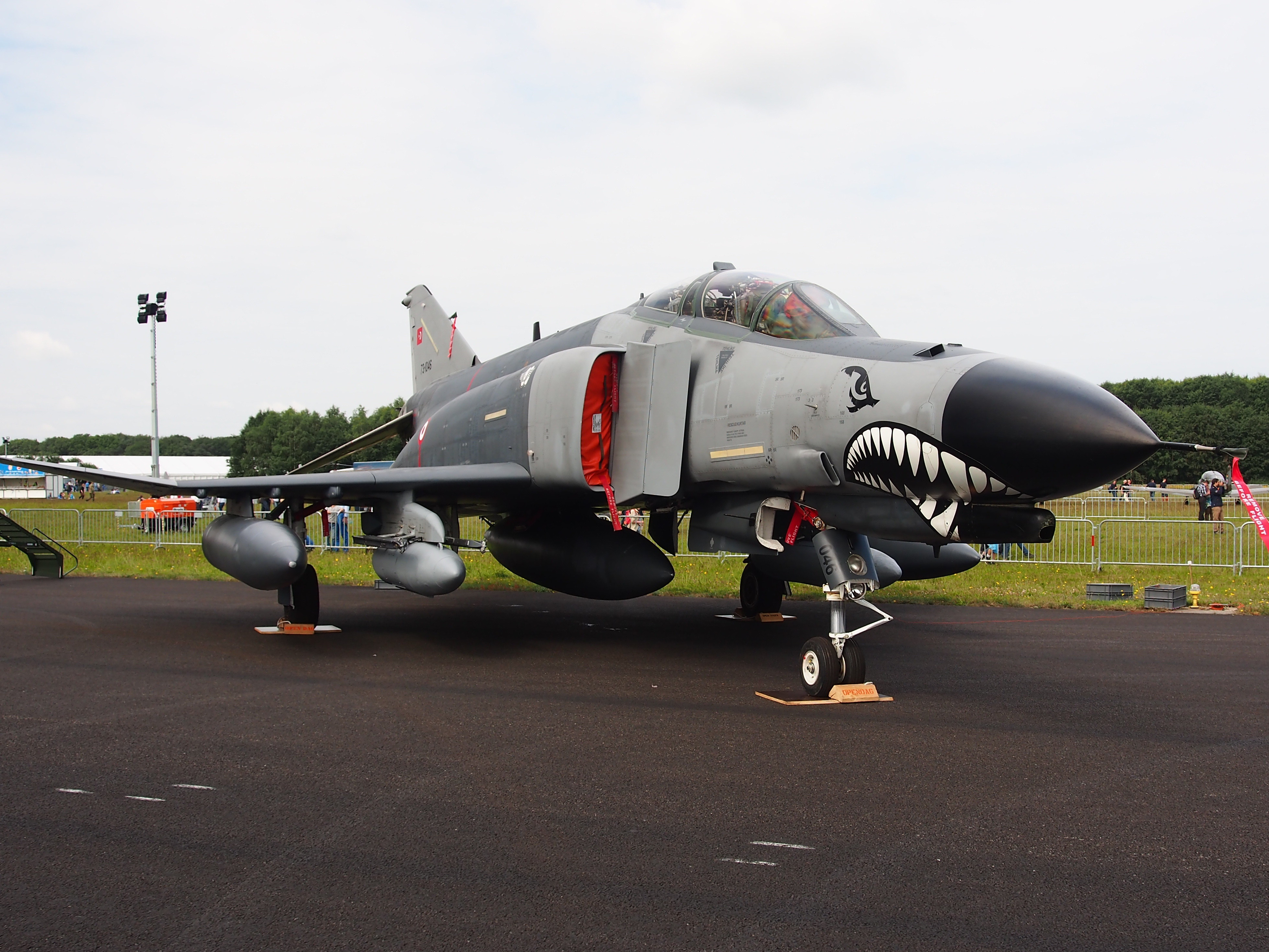
F-4E-2020 Terminator

The latest in a long line of F-4 variants, the Terminators are a batch of Turkish Air Force F-4Es, modernized by Israel on the pattern of the Kurnass 2000. They differ from the existing F-4E airframe in a number of key areas, including new attachment fittings to better handle modern weaponry, stronger wing fold ribs, an updated canopy sill bar, and the replacement of some 20 km of wiring (reducing weight by 750 kg) as well as most hydraulic and pneumatic lines and hoses. A plan to increase the turn-rate and longitudinal stability of the Kurnass/Terminator derivatives through the installation of fuselage strakes over the engine inlets was abandoned after testing, and never saw installation on operational aircraft.

The most radical changes occurred in the avionics department. All 2020s have been fitted with vastly updated suite, including MFDs (multifunction displays) as standard, and incorporating a number of new technologies, such as the new Kaiser El-OP 976 wide-angle HUD and HOTAS system, high performance Elta EL/M-2032 ISAR-capable high-resolution SAR/GMTI (ground moving target indicator) multi-mode fire control radar (developed for the IAI Lavi), IAIC mission computer, new navigation equipment including GPS/INS connected to mapping mode, dual MIL-STD-1553B databus managing avionics package, Astronautics Central Air Data Computer, new UHF and IFF packages, airborne video tape recorder (AVTR), Elta EL/L-8222 active ECM pod, Mikes (Aselsan) AN/ALQ-178V3 passive embedded SPEWS, and RWR.

Additionally, they received AGM-142 Popeye/Have Nap integration, Litening-II targeting pods, and the capability to launch AGM-65D/G Maverick, AGM-88 HARM, GBU-8 HOBOS, GBU-10/12 Paveway II LGBs, general purpose and cluster bombs for air-to-ground missions, while retaining the capability to launch AIM-7 Sparrow and AIM-9 Sidewinder air-to-air missiles. It is also possible to install Pave Spike targeting pods and rocket pods of all sizes.

These upgraded F-4 Phantoms are referred to as the F-4E-2020 Terminator. Fifty-four were modernized and 30-plus of them will be in service until at least 2030. They first entered service on 27 January 2000 with deliveries to 111 and 171 Filo.

QF-4E
Remote-controlled target drone
F-4EJ

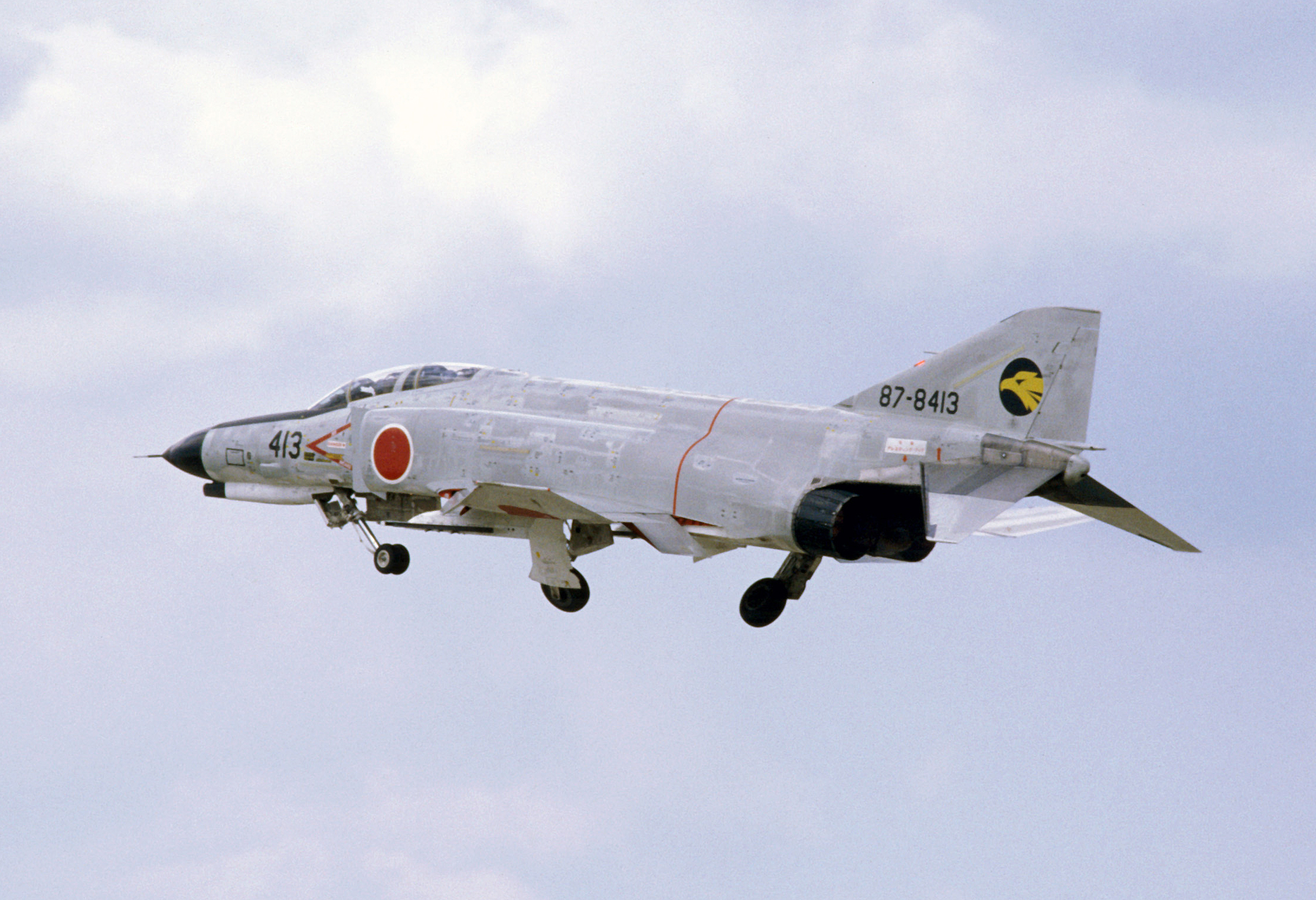
A Japanese Mitsubishi F-4EJ

Two-seat all-weather air defense fighter version of F-4E, initially lacked ground attack and in flight refueling capabilities. Built under licence in Japan, by Mitsubishi Heavy Industries for the Japan Air Self-Defense Force; 140 built (138 by Mitsubishi).
F-4EJ Kai
Upgraded version of the F-4EJ with improved avionics, including AN/APG-66J pulse-doppler radar, and ground attack capability, including ASM-1 anti-ship missile.
EF-4EJ
Small number of F-4EJs were converted into ECM training aircraft.
F-4E(S)
Three Israeli F-4E modified for high-speed reconnaissance as a cheaper alternative to the ambitious F-4X. Fitted with a new nose containing the HIAC-1 LOROP long-range camera with a 66-inch (170 cm) focal length as well as a vertical KS-87 camera. The aircraft had a false radome painted on the nose to resemble conventional F-4Es. The fate and service record of these aircraft is unknown.
RF-4E

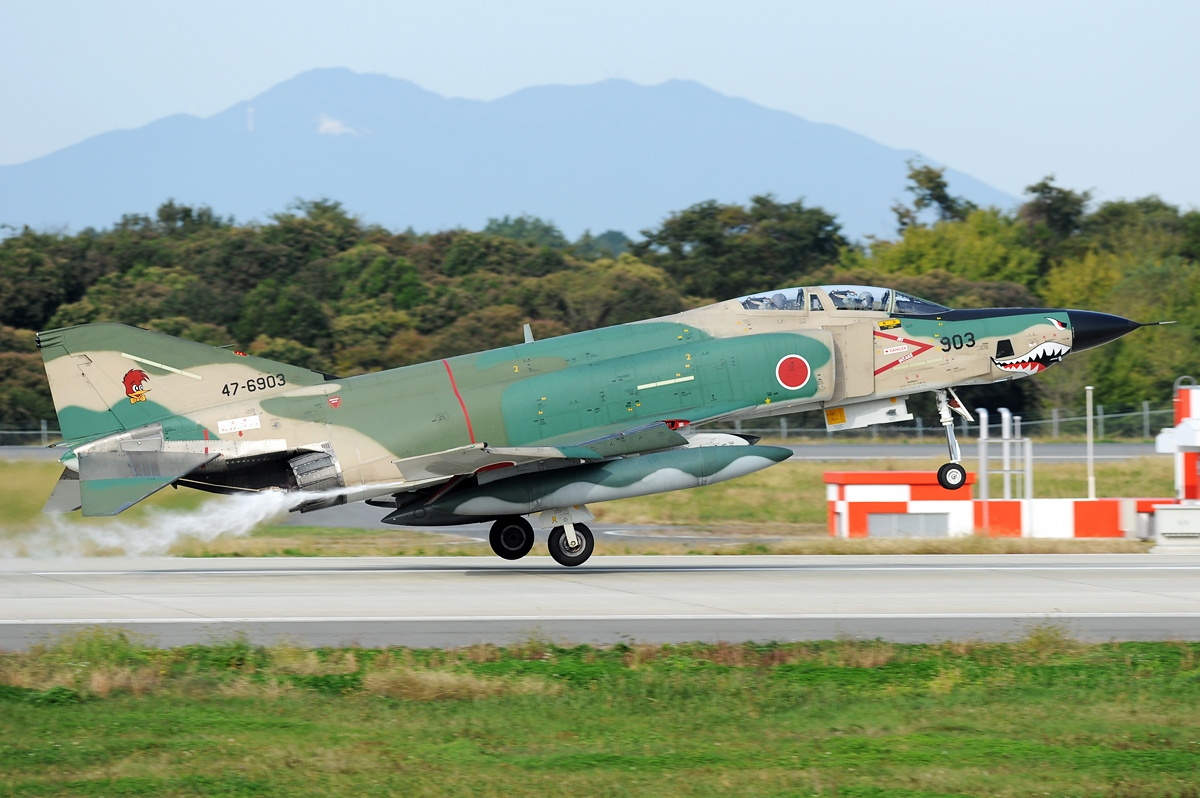
A RF-4E operated by the Japan Air Self-Defence Force

Unarmed reconnaissance version for export only. Retrofitted to carry weapons by most customers. Several German Air Force aircraft were modified for ELINT missions under Peace Trout program; 149 built.
RF-4EJ
Modified Japanese F-4EJ to operate reconnaissance equipment. Unlike RF-4E, M61 Vulcan is mounted in the nose. Fifteen converted.

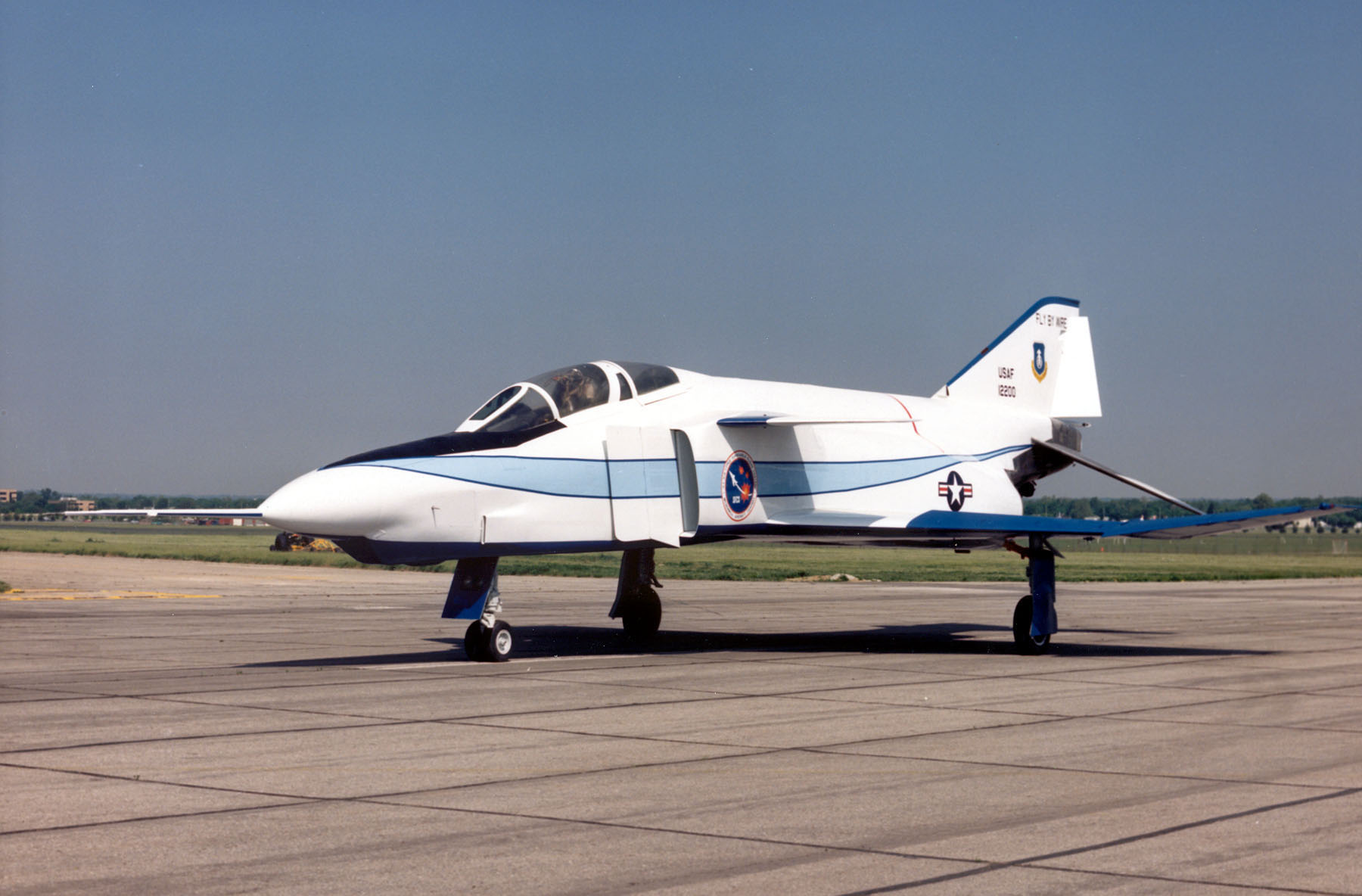
The YF-4E

YF-4E
One of the original YRF-4C prototypes was converted into the YF-4E. The YF-4E was used in the development of the F-4E fighter as well as in fly-by-wire Precision Aircraft Control Technology (PACT) and Control Configured Vehicle (CCV) test programs. Three conversions.
F-4F
Simplified late model F-4E for West German Air Force with increased compatibility with RF-4E. Roughly 1,500 kilograms (3,300 lb) lighter, lacked ram air turbine, rear fuselage fuel tank, slatted stabilizers, and ability to use AIM-7 Sparrow. All built with leading edge slats. It was originally intended to delete the rear seat from these aircraft as well, but it was not pursued due to nearly doubling the price for an already very expensive procurement program.
F-4F ICE/KWS
(Improved Combat Efficiency/Kampfwertsteigerung) Upgraded F-4F with AN/APG-65 radar and AIM-120 AMRAAM capability.
TF-4F
German trainer aircraft, with pilot instructor aft station and appropriate controls.
F-4G
U.S. Navy version, 12 F-4Bs were fitted with the AN/ASW-21 data link digital communications system for automatic carrier landings, one shot down by enemy ground fire, the surviving 11 returned to F-4B configuration.

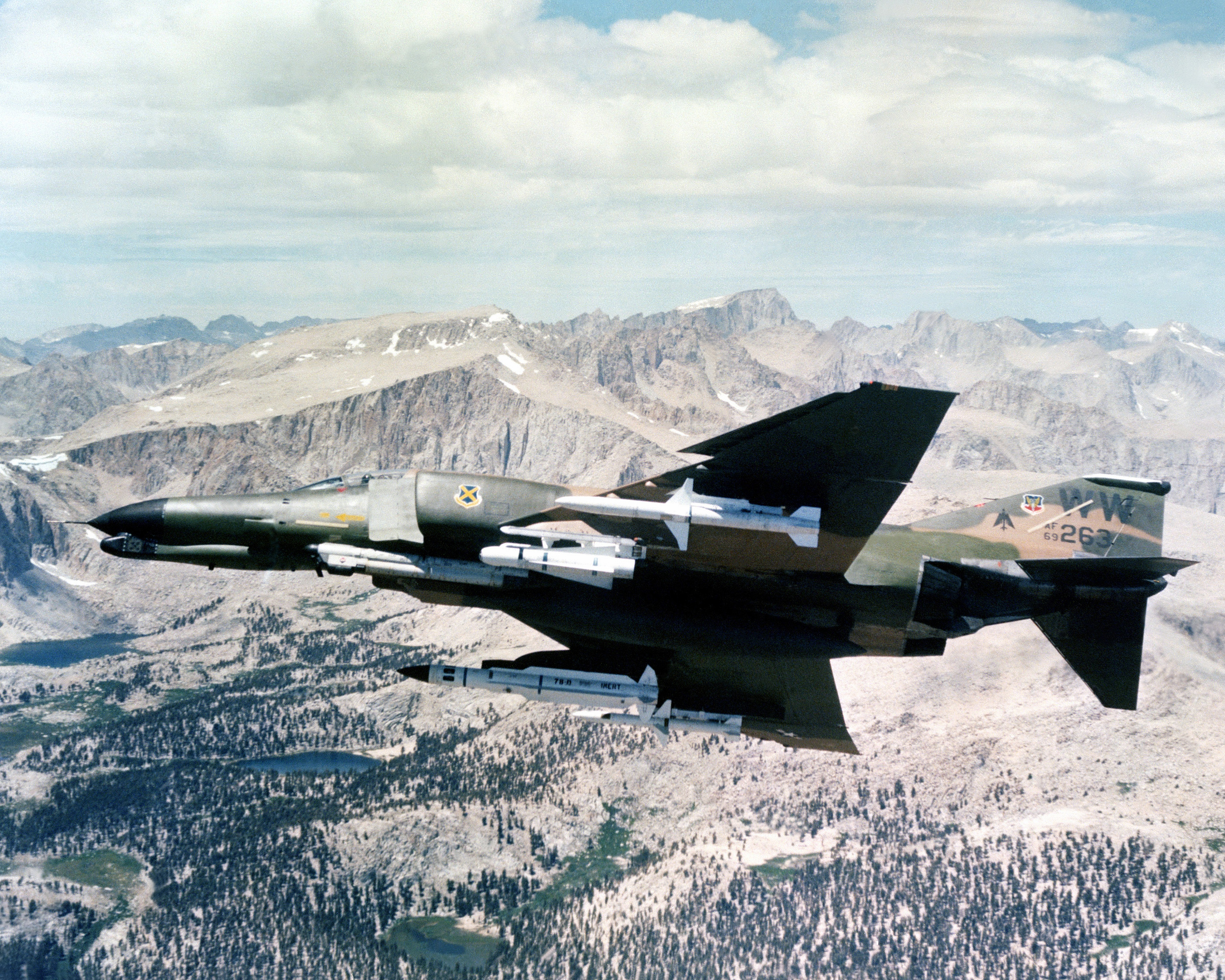
An F-4G Wild Weasel V

F-4G Wild Weasel V
F-4E converted to SEAD aircraft for the U.S. Air Force. AN/APQ-120 radar, their cannon replaced by the APR-38 RHAW and later the AN/APR-47, several ECM pods including the ALQ-87, ALQ-101, ALQ-119, ALQ-130, ALQ-131, and the ALQ-140 IR jammer, the ability to carry AGM-45 Shrike, AGM-78 Standard, and AGM-88 HARM anti-radiation missiles. Widely used during the Gulf War, Operation Provide Comfort, and Operation Southern Watch; 116 converted initially, with a further 18 F-4Es converted as attrition replacements for a total of 134.
QF-4G
Remote-controlled target drone.
F-4H
Designation not used to avoid confusion with the pre-1962 F4H.

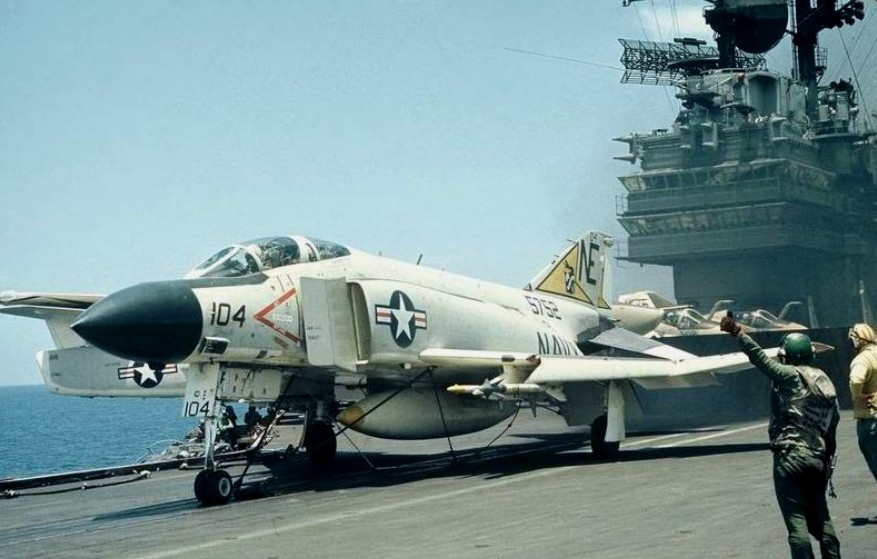
A U.S. Navy F-4J, 1971

F-4J
Improved F-4B version for U.S. Navy and Marine Corps, with emphasis on air-to-air combat capability improvement, which include: J79-GE-10 engines with 17,844 lbf (79.37 kN) of afterburner thrust each, AN/APG-59 pulse doppler radar coupled with the AN/AWG-10 Fire Control System for look-down shoot-down capability, larger main landing gear wheels resulting in wing bulges similar to F-4C, slatted tailplane, ailerons drooped 16.5° when landing gear and flaps were deployed to decrease the landing speed, zero-zero ejection seats, expanded ground attack capability, no IRST sensor under the nose; One USN pilot and one USN Naval Flight Officer became aces in F-4Js. First flight May 1966; 522 built.
F-4J(UK) Phantom F.3
Designation of 15 low airtime F-4J aircraft purchased by the Royal Air Force from the U.S. Navy in 1984, upgraded to F-4S standard with some British equipment. Although designated Phantom F.3 by the RAF, the aircraft was often referred to as F-4J(UK). Used until 1991 by No. 74 Squadron RAF only for UK air defense in lieu of Phantoms sent to Falklands.
DF-4J
One F-4J converted into a drone control aircraft.
EF-4J
Two F-4Js converted into ECM training aircraft.
YF-4J
Three F-4Bs were converted into YF-4J prototypes. The YF-4Js were used in the development of the F-4J.

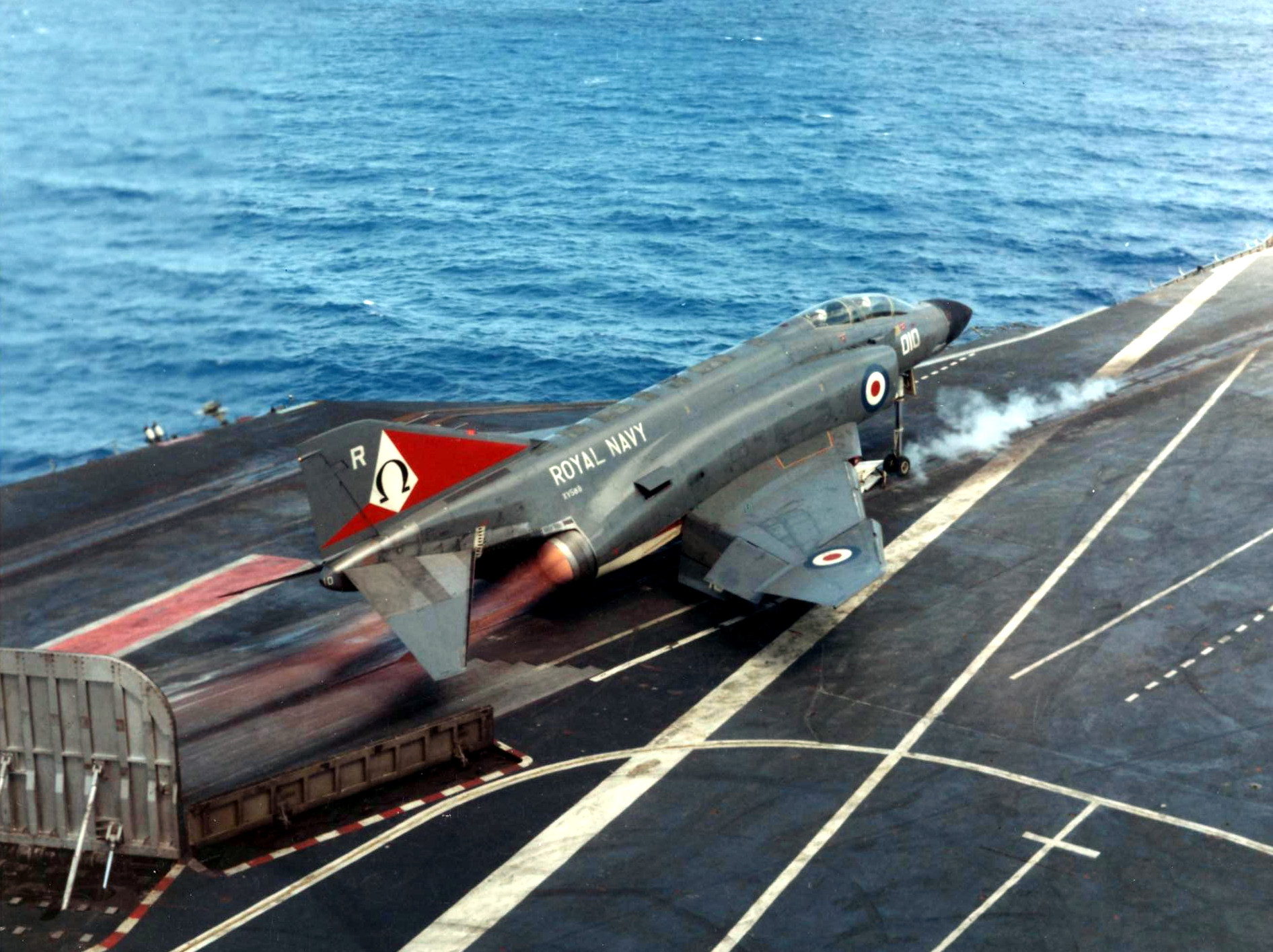
F-4K of 892 NAS launched from HMS Ark Royal, 1972.

F-4 Phantom comparisons

F-4E Phantom

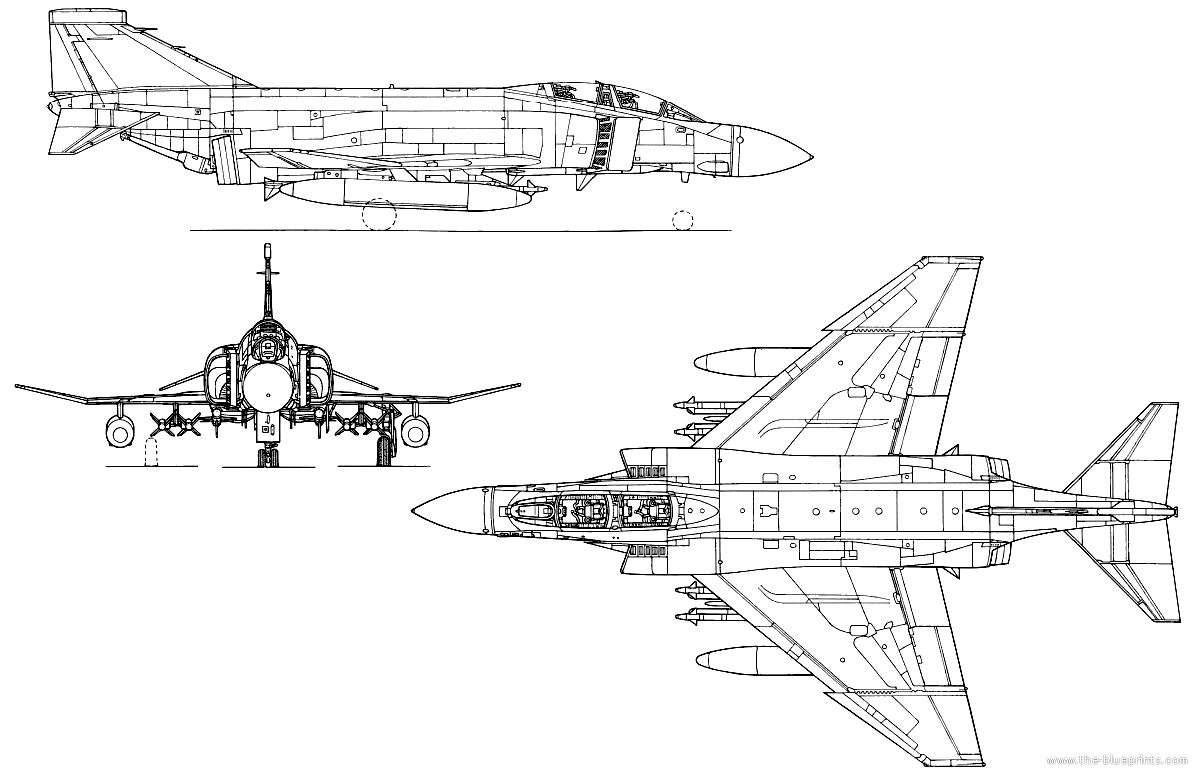
F-4K Phantom

F-4K Phantom FG.1
F-4J version for Fleet Air Arm of the Royal Navy to replace the De Havilland Sea Vixen. Operated as the Phantom FG.1 (Fighter/Ground attack). Folding nose and extending nosewheel leg. Re-engined with the more powerful British Rolls-Royce Spey 202 turbofan engines which required an enlarged fuselage but gave more power taking off from smaller carriers and was already in use with Blackburn Buccaneer on RN carriers. Delivered from 1968, with cancellation of planned carriers order cut and 20 diverted to the Royal Air Force before going into service; 50 built. RN aircraft withdrawn by 1978 and passed to RAF.
YF-4K
Two prototypes, used in the development of the F-4K.
F-4L
Designation applied to several proposals for an advanced version, including Model 98FOA with RR Spey turbofan engines and AIM-54 Phoenix missiles.
F-4M Phantom FGR.2
Tactical fighter, ground-attack, and reconnaissance aircraft developed from F-4K for the Royal Air Force, UK designation Phantom FGR.2, ordered after cancellation of the Hawker Siddeley P.1154 supersonic V/STOL aircraft. RR Spey turbofan engines; 116 built. Replaced English Electric Canberra and Hawker Hunter. Replaced in turn by SEPECAT Jaguar in ground-attack mission; replaced English Electric Lightning in air defense role.
YF-4M
Two prototypes used in the development of the F-4M.

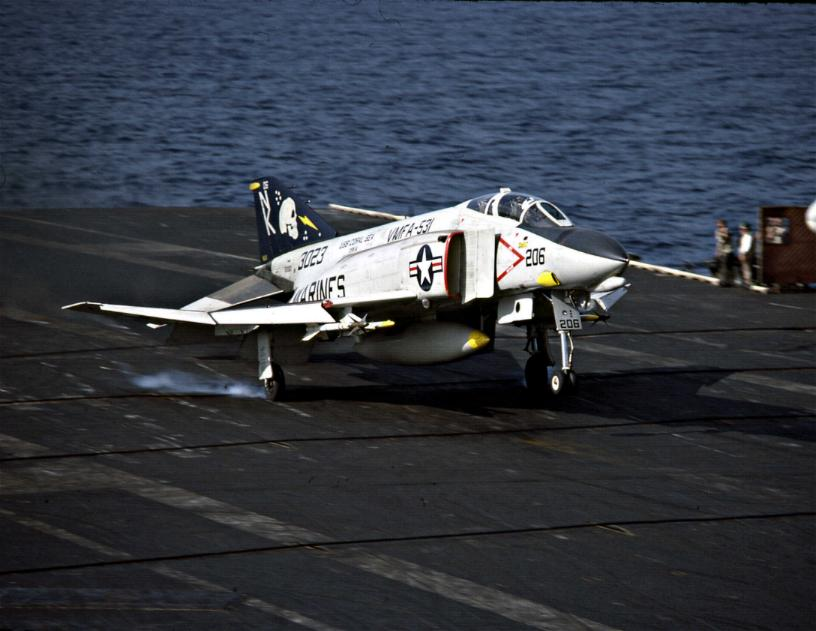
A U.S. Marine Corps F-4N aboard Coral Sea, 1980

F-4N
F-4B modernized under project Bee Line, the same aerodynamic improvements as F-4J, smokeless engines. First flight 4 June 1972; 228 converted.
QF-4N
F-4Ns converted into remote-controlled supersonic target drones.
F-4S
F-4J modernized with smokeless engines, reinforced airframe, leading-edge slats for improved maneuverability. First flight July 1977; 302 converted.
QF-4S
F-4S converted into supersonic target drones.
F-4E/TM Şimşek (Lightning)
F-4E modernised by ASELSAN for the Turkish Air Force, with structural and avionics upgrades. Sixteen upgraded from 2010.
RF-4E/TM Işık (Light)
RF-4E modernised by ASELSAN for Turkish Air Force, with structural strengthening, improved avionics and a new reconnaissance pod. Eighteen upgraded from 2009.

== Proposals ==
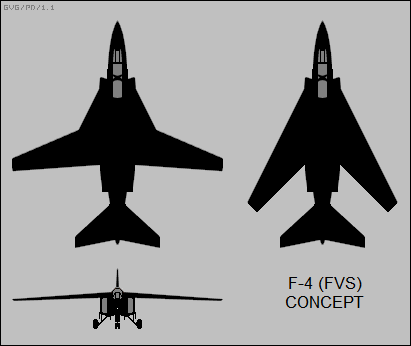
Variable Geometry Phantom proposal

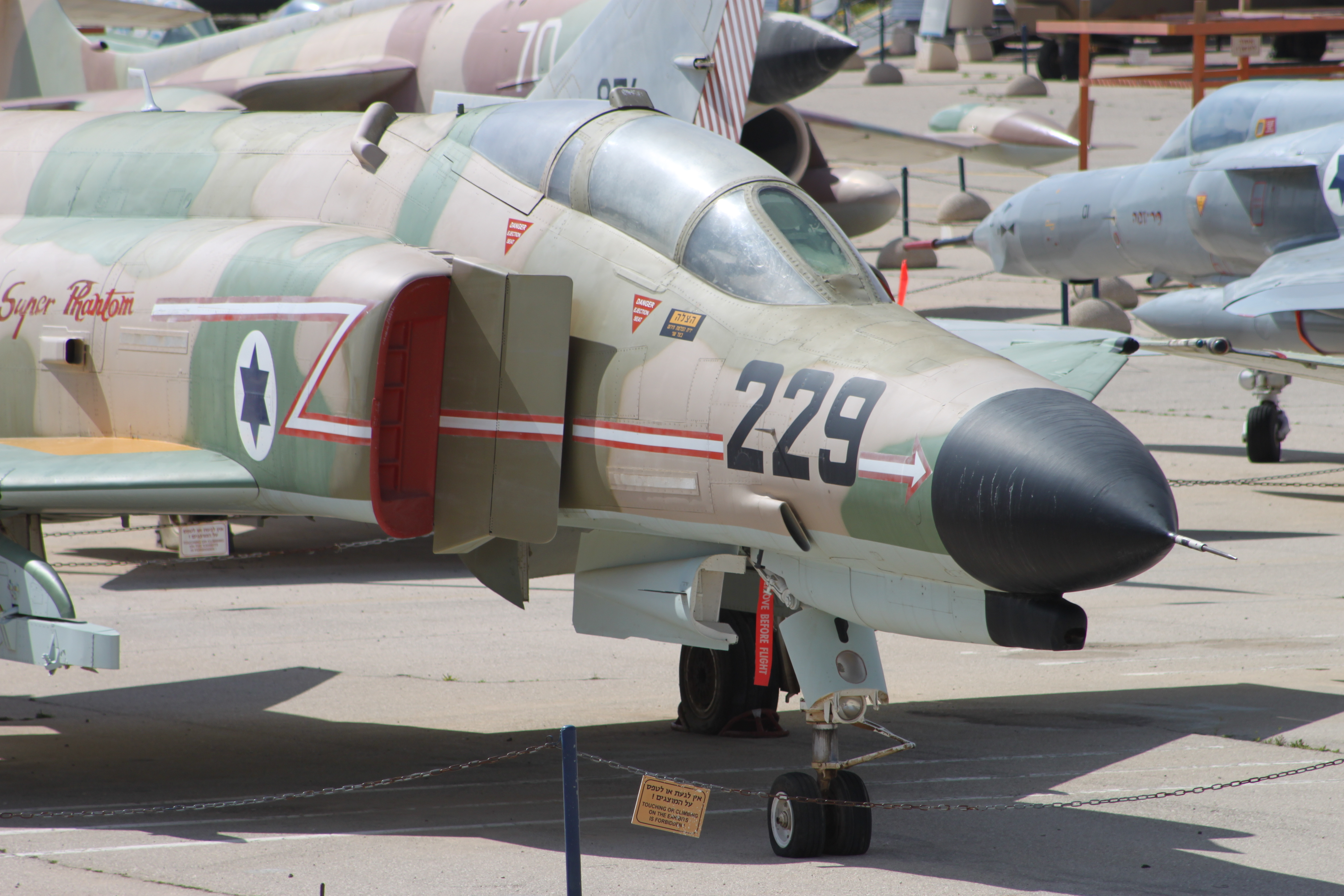
4X-JPA, the Super Phantom prototype, on display at the Israeli Air Force Museum

F4H
Proposed ground attack variants Model 98DA and Model 98DB for U.S. Army to take off from grass field/forward air base powered by Allison Spey (AR-168), modified from F4H-1; none built.
F-4E(F)
Proposed single-seat simplified version of F-4E for the German Air Force; none built.
F-4L
Proposed AIM-54 Phoenix capable advanced Phantom variant (Model 98FOA) offered to the U.S. Navy in 1963/64 as a replacement for the F-8 Crusader in the fleet defense role The F-4L had an increased wingspan and powered by Allison TF41-A-2 turbofans for quicker acceleration taking off Essex-class carriers.
RF-4M
Proposed dedicated reconnaissance variant of the F-4M for the RAF; intention to fit equipment internally rather than through carriage of external reconnaissance pod. Not proceeded with.
F-4T
Proposed lightweight air superiority-only fighter version; none built.
F-4X (U.S. Navy)
F-4X was a 1960s program pursued by the U.S. Navy in search of substantial upgrades to the extant F-4 fleet due to the ongoing issues with F-111B's development, as a potential alternative to what would become F-14. The fire control system was one of the main focuses of the program, with four variants proposed. The most basic was a new version of AN/AWG-10 using solid state electronics to enable track while scan operation of the radar. Beyond that was multishot AWG-10, leveraging the track while scan capability to enable multiple AIM-7 missiles to be guided simultaneously, even against different targets through the addition of a dedicated guidance antenna in the nose. The ultimate evolution of the AWG-10 was to introduce compatibility with AIM-54, as the missile was considered essential for the combat air patrol role the aircraft was to fill. A variant of AN/AWG-9 was also proposed, as it was substantially more powerful and better suited to the mission set, at the cost of requiring far more power and space than any AWG-10. All designs also added an extendable nose gear akin to that of the Phantom FG.1 for better catapult performance, and switched from a bridle to nose tow for attaching to the catapult.
F-4J+ was the most basic, modifying the F-4's wings for improved fuel capacity and lift characteristics.
F-4(FV)L furthered this, outright replacing the wing with one of reduced area and adding new high lift devices which allowed a 1,200 U.S. gal (1,000 imp gal; 4,500 L) drop tank to be carried on the centerline station in lieu of the extant 600 U.S. gal (500 imp gal; 2,300 L) one carried there for increased range.
F-4(FV)H was a high-wing variant, with a new thinner wing that reduced drag, but required relocating the landing gear into the fuselage akin to MiG-23.
F-4(FV)S was a swing wing development of F-4(FV)H, reducing wing area and increasing tail area. While this reduced the fuel volume compared to the other options, the reduction in drag meant it was the longest ranged. This design was also offered with new engines, leveraging the work done for Phantom FGR.2 to fit it with Rolls-Royce Speys or resultant engines from the Advanced Turbine Engine Gas Generator program, developed by either General Electric or Pratt & Whitney. With these new engines, the aircraft would be able to both reach Mach 2.5 and was predicted to be able to remain on CAP for 6.82 hours with droptanks and fly 942 nmi (1,745 km) while carrying a Mark 28 nuclear bomb, far exceeding the performance of F-4J.
F-4X (Israel)
Proposed high-performance reconnaissance version with HIAC-1 LOROP camera for Israel developed under the Peace Jack program in conjunction with General Dynamics. Water injection was projected to give the aircraft a top speed in excess of Mach 3 (over 2,000 mph [3,200 km/h] at high altitudes). The water would be contained in a pair of 2,500 U.S. gal (2,100 imp gal; 9,500 L) conformal tanks on the sides of the fuselage spine. The U.S. State Department became worried about developing an aircraft with performance similar to the SR-71 Blackbird and offensive capability beyond anything in domestic inventory for a foreign customer and forbade its export. The proposal was then modified to the RF-4X standard with the camera in the nose and removal of weapon carriage. However, the U.S. Air Force withdrew from the project over concerns that a high-performance Phantom would jeopardize funding for the anticipated McDonnell Douglas F-15 Eagle. Without United States financial support, Israel settled for the simpler, less expensive F-4E(S), which was given the nickname 'Shablool', or 'Snail'.
Boeing Super Phantom
A 1984 joint venture between Boeing and Pratt & Whitney for a Phantom variant with Pratt & Whitney PW1120 turbofan engines, giving a significant performance gain over J79 Phantoms. The aircraft would also have an 1,110 U.S. gal (920 imp gal; 4,200 L) conformal fuel tank under the fuselage. Cancelled early in development.
IAI Super Phantom
A separate Israel Aircraft Industries project was proposed for a PW1120-powered Phantom, and one prototype built. IAI's F-4 "Super Phantom" or F-4-2000, which could exceed Mach 1 without afterburners, was displayed at the 1987 Paris Air Show.

== See also ==
- McDonnell Douglas F-4 Phantom II
- McDonnell Douglas F-4 Phantom II non-U.S. operators
- List of McDonnell Douglas F-4 Phantom II U.S. operators
