= Ford Aerospace =

Aerospace and defense division of Ford Motor Company

- Formerly: Aeronutronic (1956–1963); Philco-Ford Corporation (1961–1975); Aeronutronic Ford Corporation (1975–1976); Ford Aerospace & Communications Corporation (1976–1988)
- Type: Subsidiary
- Industry: Aerospace, military
- Founded: 1956
- Defunct: 1990; 36 years ago
- Fate: Sold to Loral Corporation
- Headquarters: Dearborn, Michigan, US
- Products: Missiles, targeting pods
- Parent: Ford Motor Company

Ford Aerospace was the aerospace and defense division of Ford Motor Company. It was based in Dearborn, Michigan and was active from 1956 (originally as Philco and then Philco Ford) through 1990, when it was sold to the Loral Corporation. Major divisions were located in Palo Alto CA (Space Systems Division), San Jose CA (Western Development Laboratories) and Newport Beach (Aeronutronic Division). Other operations were located in a number of other states around the United States.

== History ==
The company was established in 1956. It was renamed to "Ford Aerospace and Communications Corporation" in 1976, and then to "Ford Aerospace Corporation" in 1988.

The 99 acres (40 ha) Engineering and Research Center campus was located on Jamboree Road at Ford Road, overlooking the Santa Catalina Strait of the Pacific Ocean in Newport Beach. The facility's master plan and main buildings were designed by Modernist architect William Pereira in 1958. Operation was moved to Newport Beach in 1960.

In the 1960s and 1970s, business enjoyed rapid growth because of the success of the Sidewinder air-to-air missile and Chaparral surface-to-air missile programs. In the 1970s, the Pave Tack bomb-targeting system became a significant contributor to revenue.

The company included: Space Systems Division (later Space Systems/Loral) and the Western Development Labs (WDL) (later Loral WDL, and presently Lockheed Martin WDL) in Palo Alto, California with Aeronutronic (later Space Systems/Loral) at the Newport Beach site.

=== Company timeline ===
A partial company timeline includes:

- 1956: Aeronutronic becomes a Ford Motor Company division.
- 1961: Ford Motor Company acquires Philco Corporation, later named Philco-Ford Corporation.
- 1963: Ford Motor Company folds Aeronutronic into Philco, strengthening Ford Motor Company's overall participation in space and defense markets.
- 1975: Philco-Ford becomes Aeronutronic Ford Corporation
- 1976: Aeronutronic Ford Corporation becomes Ford Aerospace & Communications Corporation.
- 1981: FACC starts new sister division to Aeroneutronics in Southern California named DIVAD (Division Air Defense) for the production of the M247 Sgt. York self-propelled anti-air artillery vehicle in Newport Beach and Lake Forest, CA.
- 1984: DIVAD division dissolved after Defense Secretary Caspar Weinberger canceled the production contract for the M247 and all existing units were dismantled for scrap.
- 1988: Ford Aerospace San Jose CA location working on NATO Airbase SATCOM (NABS) Skynet control facilities.
- 1990: Ford Aerospace sold to Loral Corporation. The sale did not include the lease of land for the Newport Beach plant, which the buyer was required to vacate within five years.

== Products ==
- AGM-88 HARM (subcontractor)
- AIM-9 Sidewinder
- AN/AAS-38 (F/A-18 FLIR)
- Have Dash
- LGM-118 Peacekeeper (subcontractor)
- LGM-30 Minuteman (subcontractor)
- MGM-51 Shillelagh
- MIM-72 Chaparral
- M247 Sergeant York
- Pave Knife
- Pave Tack
- UGM-73 Poseidon (subcontractor)
- Trident (missile) (subcontractor)

== See also ==
- Technology companies based in the Greater Los Angeles Area
