= Boeing CQM-121 Pave Tiger =

Unmanned aerial vehicle by Boeing

CQM-121A / CGM-121B
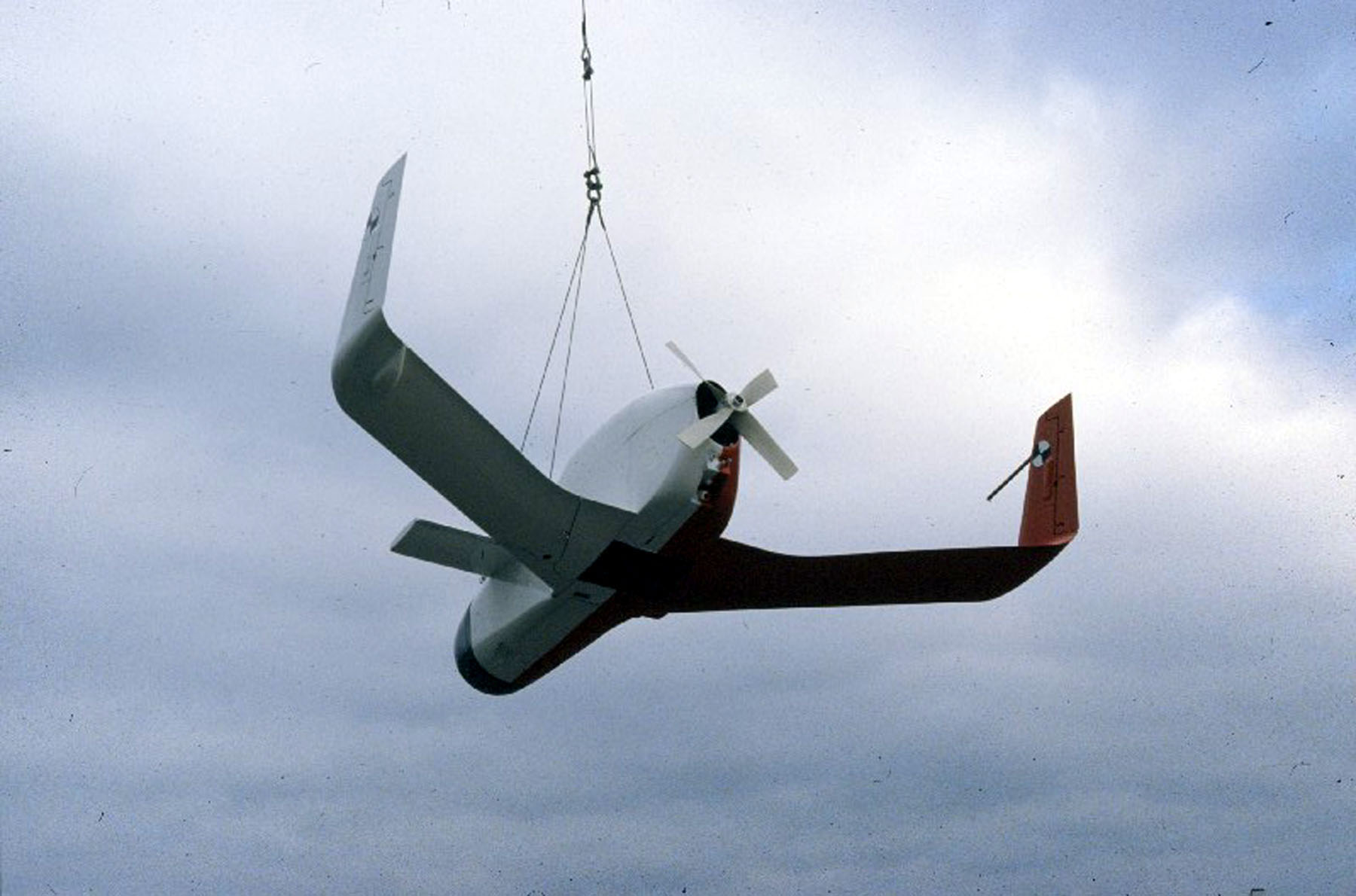
- YCGM-121B at the National Museum of the USAF

General information
- Type: Anti-radar drone
- National origin: United States
- Manufacturer: Boeing
- Primary user: United States Air Force
- Number built: 13 (YCQM-121A)

History
- First flight: 1983
- Retired: 1989

The Boeing CQM-121 Pave Tiger is an unmanned aerial vehicle developed by Boeing for use by the United States Air Force. Intended for the Suppression of Enemy Air Defenses (SEAD) role, the drone reached the flight-test stage before cancellation.

== Design and development ==
The CQM-121 program began in 1983, with Boeing being awarded a contract for the development of a small drone aircraft that was intended for the suppression of enemy air defenses. The resulting YCQM-121A, given the code name "Pave Tiger", was a tailless aircraft powered by a two-stroke engine. The drones were to be fitted in 15-cell containers with wings folded; the sides of the container would open to allow for launch on a rail using a solid-fuel rocket booster. The aircraft would then follow a pre-programmed route, and could either use electronic countermeasures to suppress air defense systems, or use a small warhead to directly destroy them.

== Operational history ==
Flight testing of the 13 YCQM-121A aircraft began in 1983, however the following year the project was terminated. The aircraft was resurrected in 1987, however, as an alternative to the AGM-136 Tacit Rainbow anti-radar missile; the anti-radar version, designated YCGM-121B and codenamed "Seek Spinner", first flew in 1988. It was equipped with a warhead for the destruction of enemy radars, and could loiter while awaiting detection of an enemy radar set. The program was terminated in 1989.

Also in 1987, the U.S. Air Force ordered an electronic countermeasure version of the aircraft, given the designation YCEM-138A Pave Cricket. Equipped with an AN/ALQ-176 jammer, the program was also cancelled in 1989.

== Variants ==
YCQM-121A Pave Tiger
Original radar jamming variant; 13 built.
YCGM-121B Seek Spinner
Loitering anti-radar missile variant.
YCEM-138A Pave Cricket
Electronic countermeasures version of YCGM-121B.

== Specifications (YCQM-121A) ==
Data from Parsch 2002

General characteristics

- Crew: None
- Length: 6 ft 11.4 in (2.118 m)
- Wingspan: 8 ft 5 in (2.57 m)
- Height: 2 ft (0.61 m)
- Gross weight: 280 lb (127 kg) w/out booster
- Powerplant: 1 × Cuyuna Eagle 26.7 cu in (438 cc) two-stroke piston engine, 28 hp (21 kW)
- Powerplant: 1 × Solid rocket booster

Performance

- Maximum speed: 200 mph (320 km/h, 170 kn)
- Cruise speed: 90 mph (140 km/h, 78 kn)
- Range: 500 mi (800 km, 430 nmi)
- Endurance: 8 hours
- Service ceiling: 10,000 ft (3,000 m)

Armament

- Optional high-explosive warhead
