= Pave Tack =

Targeting pod for military aircraft

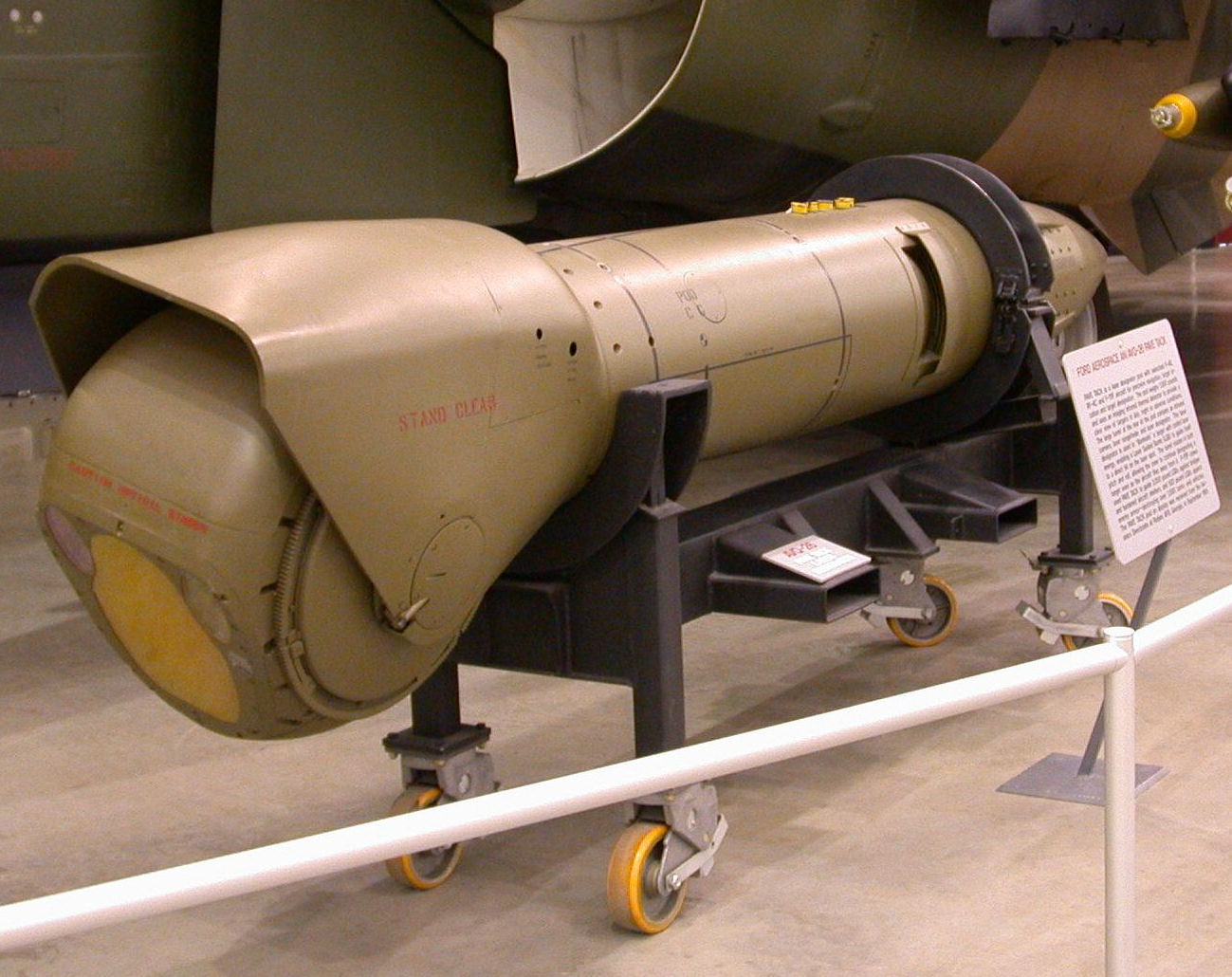
Pave Tack

The Ford Aerospace AN/AVQ-26 Pave Tack is an electro-optical targeting pod for military attack aircraft. It uses a laser and forward looking infrared to find and designate targets for laser-guided bombs and other precision-guided munitions. Pave Tack's images are routed to a cockpit display, usually for the weapon systems officer.

== History ==
Pave Tack was developed in the late 1970s and entered service in 1982, and was initially used by the USAF McDonnell Douglas F-4 Phantom II and General Dynamics F-111C Aardvark strike aircraft. It was first used in combat in 1986 during the Operation Eldorado Canyon air raid against Libya by F-111F aircraft stationed at RAF Lakenheath, England. F-111s used it to great effect in the Gulf War of 1991, against both fixed targets and tanks.

F-4 crews called Pave Tack "Pave Drag" because it was carried externally. Pave Tack is a large installation, with the 166 inch (4,220 mm)-long pod alone weighing 1,385 lb (629 kg); on the F-4, the pod had to be carried on the centerline station in place of the standard drop tank, imposing substantial aerodynamic drag, and was generally unpopular. The F-111C and F-111F had a rotating carriage normally carrying the Pave Tack pod in its internal bomb bay to reduce drag and protect it from damage, deploying it externally when in use.

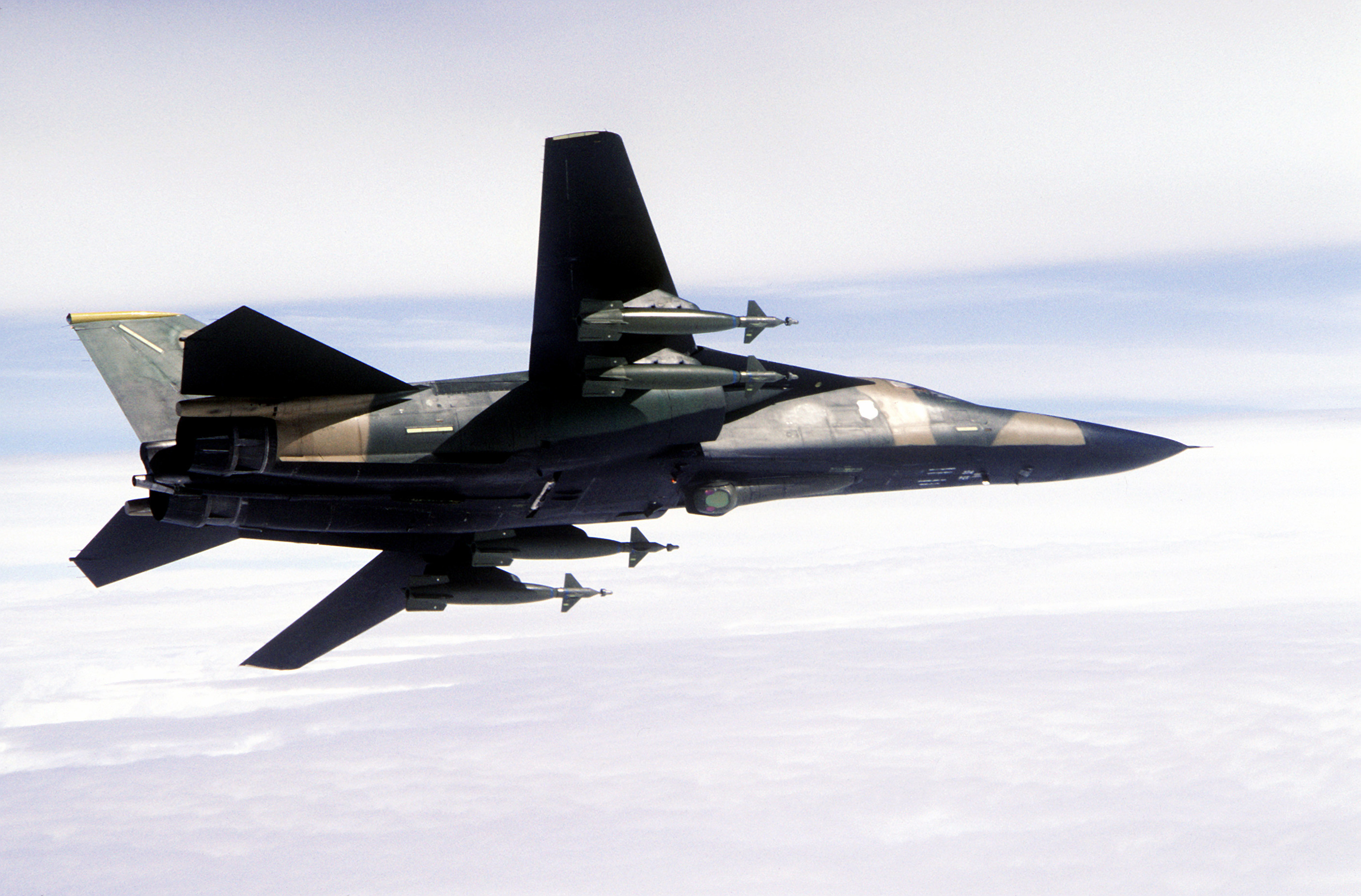
A 48th TFW F-111F in 1982, equipped with a Pave Tack and GBU-10s.

About 150 AVQ-26 pods were built, substantially fewer than originally planned. The last USAF Pave Tacks were withdrawn with the retirement of the F-111 in 1996.

The Royal Australian Air Force (RAAF) purchased ten Pave Tack pods in 1980 for its F-111 fleet. All 24 F-111Cs were wired for the pod, although there were not enough pods for all to be simultaneously equipped. Following the retirement of the USAF's F-111F in 1996 the RAAF purchased enough surplus pods for all of its F-111Cs.

The Republic of Korea Air Force (RoKAF) ordered an initial batch of eight pods in 1984 for delivery in 1987. It may have subsequently obtained additional pods from USAF surplus. The RoKAF uses the pods on its F-4 Phantoms.

== See also ==
- Pave Penny
- Pave Knife
- Pave Spike
- LANTIRN
- List of military electronics of the United States
