= Pave Spike =

Targeting pod

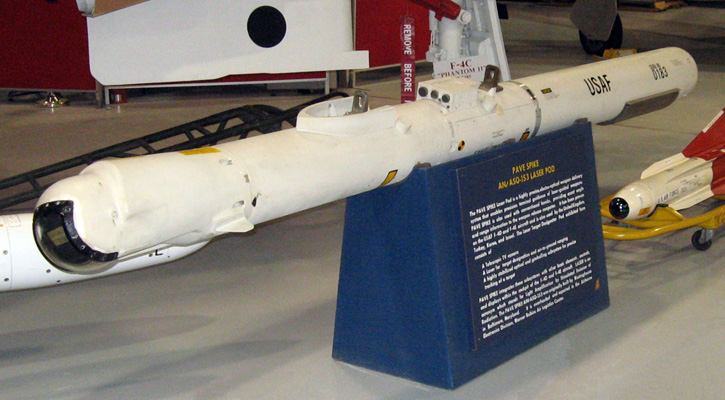
AN/ASQ-153 Pave Spike

The Westinghouse AN/ASQ-153\AN/AVQ-23 Pave Spike is an electro-optical laser designator targeting pod used to direct laser-guided bombs (LGBs) to target in daylight, visual conditions. It contained a laser boresighted to a television camera, which displayed its image on a cockpit screen.

== Development ==
Pave Spike was developed (alongside Pave Tack) replace the earlier Pave Knife laser designator in daylight conditions. Pave Knife was used by the USAF F-4D/E Phantom II and was bulky, slowing the F-4 and restricting maneuverability while occupying one of the weapons pylons on the F-4. Pave Spike was much smaller, the 144-inch-long (3.66 m), 420-lb (209 kg) pod was designed for carriage on the left, forward AIM-7 Sparrow missile station of the F-4. Because it was smaller and nestled into the semi-submerged AIM-7 station, it did not restrict F-4 speed or maneuverability, nor did it occupy a precious weapons pylon. The F-4 still had three AIM-7 stations in which it could carry the usual radar-guided missiles. Pave Spike, like Pave Knife, had a clear dome nose through which a television camera viewed the target area, and through which the laser could fire to designate the target. The entire nose assembly gimbaled to look throughout the hemisphere below the jet.

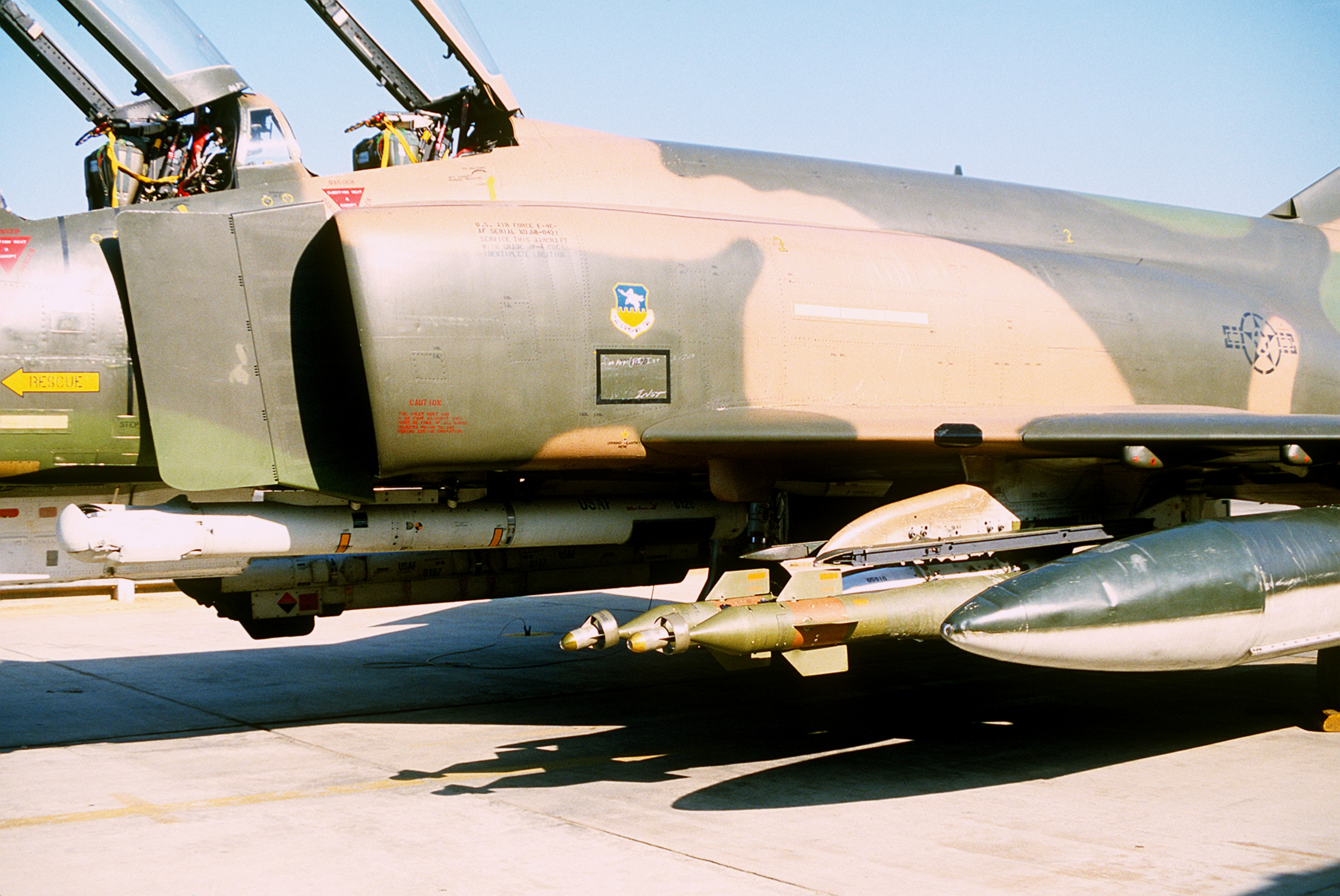
Pave Spike carried on an F-4E

By 1976 the F–4 Fighter Weapons School squadron, the 414th Fighter Weapons Squadron at Nellis Air Force Base, was flying its F-4E fighters with the new Pave Spike pod and learning how to employ the system throughout its performance envelope. The pod was on the leading edge of technology for the day and had several operating modes and bombing options.

The system offered the crew three options to acquire, or see, the target in the pod's television picture. In the most basic mode, the pod looked straight ahead, at the same location as the pilot's pipper on his gunsight. The pilot pointed the gunsight at the target, the Weapon systems officer (WSO) saw it in the TV picture, and, after taking command of the pod, tracked the target with his radar control handle. This mode was called 12-acquire or 12-vis because the pod looked at the visual point at the jet's 12 o'clock. A second acquisition mode was 9-acquire, or 9-vis. In this mode, the pod looked directly left of the aircraft at 9 o'clock. This mode enabled the crew to point the pod at the target before they rolled in on the attack if the target was on the left side of the airplane. The third mode, weapons release computer system acquire, was at once the most useful and the most difficult to use because of its complexity. During their mission planning, the crew measured the distance between a point that was easy to find and their intended target. As they approached the target, the crew could fly over the preplanned point, whereupon the WSO pushed a button that commanded the pod to look directly at the target over the premeasured distance.

All of these modes were particularly useful if the crews planned to fly at low altitude to the target, then pop up to higher altitudes to drop their LGB. In fact, a proficient crew might plan to use all three, each one as a backup for the other, during the attack. As the attackers zipped toward the target, they would plan to have the target offset to their left side. First, they would fly over a known point and insert the weapons release computer system (WRCS) offsets to slave the pod toward the target. Then, at a specific distance from the target, the pilot would select full afterburner and start a 20- or 30-degree climb, while visually scanning out the left side for the target. If the WRCS acquire worked perfectly, then the WSO would see the target in the picture. If not, and the pilot saw the target visually, he would tell the WSO to put the pod in 9-acquire to find the target. If that worked, fine, but if it did not, then the pilot would start a left roll in and put his pipper on the target, after telling the WSO to change acquisition modes again to the 12-acquire option.

For low altitude attacks crews adopted a 10-degree loft, 2 miles (3.2 km) from the target. With the pod in 12-acquire, the crew flew directly at the target at very low altitude. As soon as the WSO saw the target in his TV, he took command of the pod and started lasing the target. A cockpit indicator displayed exact laser range to the target, and, at precisely two miles from the target, the pilot depressed the release button and pulled sharply up. The computer would then release the bomb at 10 degrees of climb. The whole pull-up and release process took only two seconds. Immediately after the bomb came off, the pilot would start a 6-g turn away from the target and back to low altitude, while the WSO lased the target until the bomb hit.

In December 1978 the 414th Fighter Weapons Squadron got the opportunity to demonstrate how the Pave Spike pod and the new 500-pound GBU-12 Paveway II could perform at low altitude. The Air Force hosted a precision-guided munitions firepower demonstration for the secretary of defense to showcase improvements in precision munitions. The squadron successfully destroyed a fuel tank partially filled with expired jet fuel with four LGBs in a low-altitude loft attack. By the end of the 1970s Pave Spike tactics and systems were a mature part of the F-4 fleet.

Even though Pave Spike was a good system, it was suited for use only during periods of good visibility during the daytime. At night, in haze, or in bad weather, the pod could not be used.

== Service ==
156 examples of the original AN/ASQ-153 were used from 1974 through 1989.

In 1979, the Royal Air Force acquired a number of the simplified AN/AVQ-23E pods for their Blackburn Buccaneers. Twelve aircraft equipped with the pod were deployed to Saudi Arabia for the Gulf War to initially perform laser designation for other RAF aircraft. Later in the air campaign, these aircraft would carry laser-designated bombs themselves.

The pod was replaced by systems like LANTIRN and AN/ASQ-228 ATFLIR.

The National Museum of the United States Air Force holds a Pave Spike in its collection.

== See also ==
- List of military electronics of the United States
