= Pave Knife =

Airborne laser designator pod

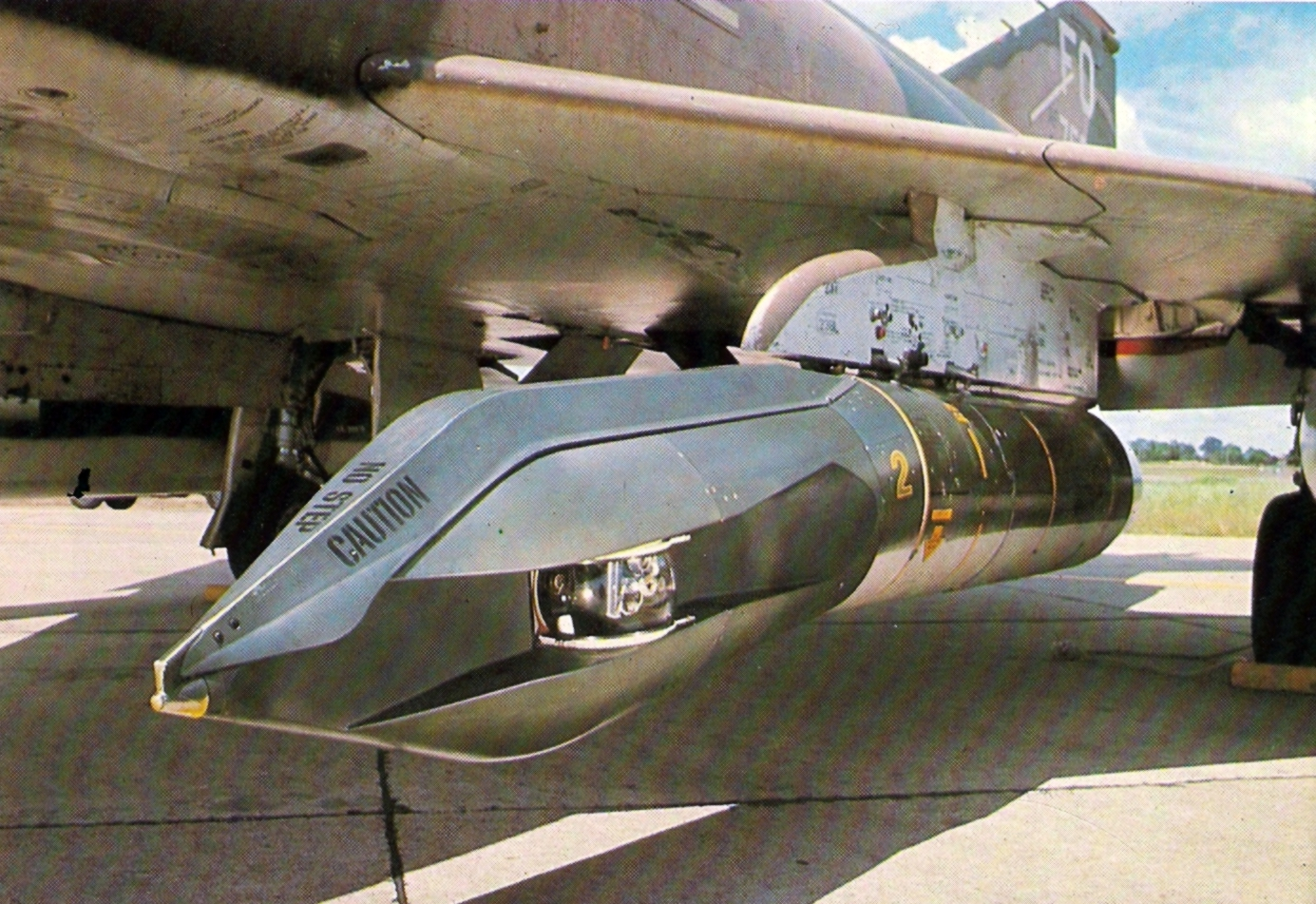
A Pave Knife on a 435th TFS F-4D in the Vietnam War, 1973.

The Ford Aerospace AN/AVQ-10 Pave Knife was an early targeting pod developed by the USAF and US Navy to designate and guide laser-guided bombs.

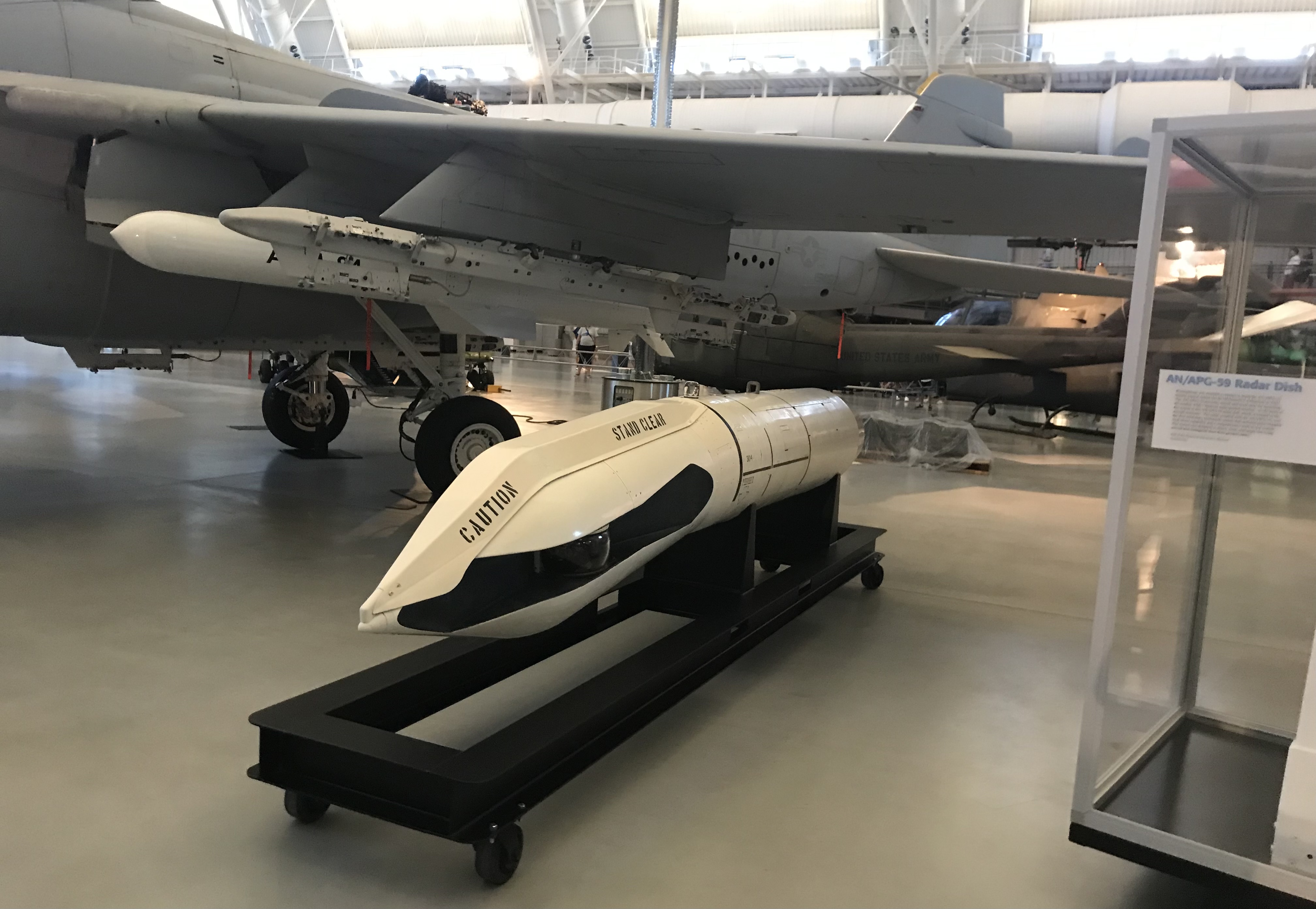
Pave Knife on display at the Steven F. Udvar-Hazy Center.

Pave Knife was developed in 1969 to replace the original, essentially improvised Airborne Laser Designator (ALD) and TRIM pod (see A-6 Intruder). ALD was not a pod but a hand-held laser operated by the weapon systems officer to mark targets for Paveway laser-guided bombs. Pave Knife was a roughly banana-shaped external pod, weighing about 550 kg (1,200 lb), containing a steerable laser and closed-circuit television camera. The weapon systems officer or bombardier/navigator (BN) monitored the TV image with a small Sony TV in the cockpit and steered the laser onto the target with a hand controller, then passing the target information to the aircraft's gun sight.

The Pave Knife bid was a firm fixed-price contract, involving design, development, and manufacture of one prototype, which was considered to be of vital nature due to the war in Vietnam.

Ford Aerospace was known at that time as Philco-Ford, Aeronutronics Division, in Newport Beach, California. This facility was recognized for its strong engineering skills in electro-optics and image stabilization. During this time, Philco-Ford was producing the optical heat seeking section of the AIM-9 missile.

A project manager convinced the company to invest (while the bids were being reviewed by the USAF) in creating the specifications for the subcontracts, selecting the subcontractors, preparing contract verbiage, and setting it up to be able to turn on all the engineering and procurement on the day after the winner of the bidding was announced. The remainder of the design, prototype fabrication and system integration was completed within budget, and on-time with delivery accomplished in an astonishing 6 months from the contract award date.

The key subcontractors were Dalmo Victor in the San Francisco Bay peninsula who provided the night vision system. Another contractor provided a very complex power supply with multiple outputs to operate numerous system components, which had to be squeezed into a semi-oval shape to fit against the inner shape of the pod, with protrusions on the power supply to fit into whatever space was left after other components were designed in. Yet another provided the laser designator.

All the subcontractors met their specifications, price, and delivery dates. When the pod was shipped to Florida for testing at Eglin Air Force Base, the system met specifications. It immediately entered testing and performed so well that within a few weeks, it was shipped to Vietnam and placed into service where it met objectives. McDonnell Douglas F-4D-31-MC, 66-7693, acted as the test-bed at the Armament Development Test Center, and the pod was carried on left inner wing pylon (Station 2), bolted on in an asymmetric configuration which typically included a 370 US gallons (1,400 L) drop tank on the starboard wing, plus up to two LGBs (on Stations 1 and 8), along with the regular fit of a centerline tank, Sparrows and ECM.

The system used various technologies including image stabilization, night vision, target designation with a laser, and optical tracking to stay with moving ground targets. It had to withstand high G forces as well as very low and very high temperatures. A second jet with a laser-guided bomb using a guidance system provided by Texas Instruments would operate as a team with the first jet and drop the munitions.

Pave Knife was used by F-4 Phantom II and A-6 Intruder aircraft in the attack role. It was used operationally in the Vietnam War; while it had its limitations, it validated the combat utility of laser-guided bombs. The Pave Knife was superseded by the later Pave Spike and Pave Tack systems, and is no longer in service. A dozen USAF F-4Ds of the 433d Tactical Fighter Squadron, all from Block 31, were wired for Pave Knife, a dozen of which pods were built and six deployed to Southeast Asia. Three were held in reserve and three were diverted to the U.S. Navy for use on A-6As of VA-145.

== See also ==
- List of military electronics of the United States
