= Lockheed F-117 Nighthawk =

American stealth ground-attack aircraft

F-117 Nighthawk
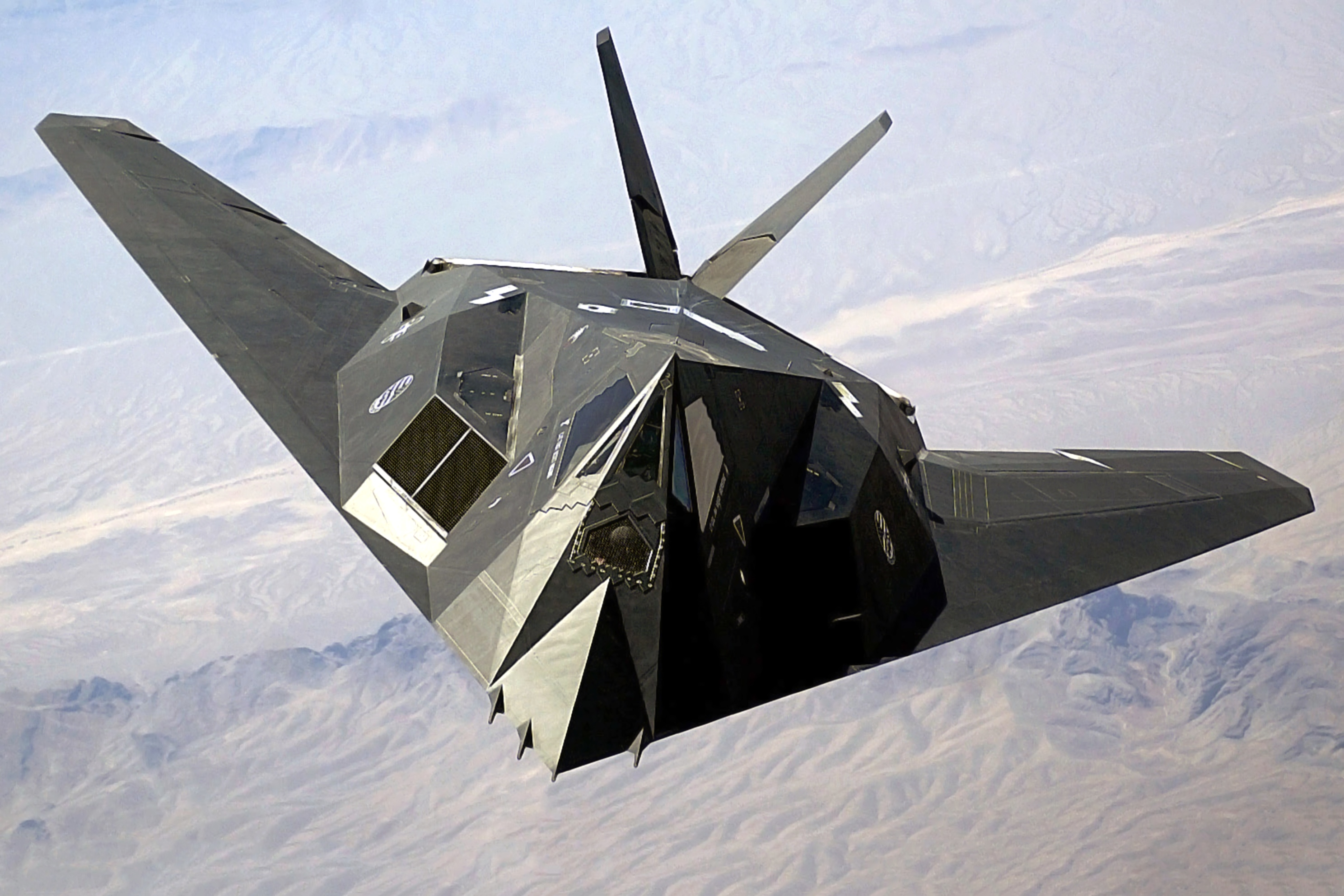
- F-117 flying over mountains in Nevada in 2002

General information
- Type: Stealth attack aircraft
- National origin: United States
- Manufacturer: Lockheed Corporation
- Status: Retired from combat in 2008, used as training aircraft as of 2026
- Primary user: United States Air Force
- Number built: 64 (5 YF-117As, 59 F-117As)

History
- Manufactured: 1981–1990
- Introduction date: October 1983; 43 years ago
- First flight: 18 June 1981; 45 years ago

The Lockheed F-117 Nighthawk is a retired American single-seat, subsonic, twin-engined stealth attack aircraft developed by Lockheed's Skunk Works division and operated by the United States Air Force (USAF). It was the first operational aircraft to be designed with stealth technology.

Work on what would become the F-117 began in the 1970s to counter increasingly sophisticated Soviet surface-to-air missiles (SAMs). In 1976, the Defense Advanced Research Projects Agency (DARPA) issued Lockheed a contract to produce the Have Blue technology demonstrator, whose test data validated the concept. On 1 November 1978, Lockheed decided to develop the F-117. Five prototypes were produced, the first of which performed its maiden flight in 1981 at Groom Lake, Nevada. The first production F-117 was delivered in 1982, and initial operating capability was achieved in October 1983. All aircraft were initially based at Tonopah Test Range Airport, Nevada.

The aircraft's faceted shape (made from flat surfaces) heavily contributes to its relatively low radar cross-section of about 0.001 m^{2} (0.0108 sq ft). To minimize its infrared signature, its non-circular tail pipe mixes hot exhaust with cool ambient air and lacks afterburners; it is also restricted to subsonic speeds, as breaking the sound barrier would produce an obvious sonic boom that would increase its acoustic and infrared footprints. While commonly referred to as the "Stealth Fighter", the aircraft was designed and employed as a dedicated attack aircraft; its performance in air combat maneuvering was less than that of most contemporary fighters. The F-117 has integrated digital navigation and attack systems, with targeting via a thermal imaging infrared system and a laser rangefinder/laser designator. It is aerodynamically unstable in all three aircraft principal axes, thus requiring constant flight corrections via a fly-by-wire flight system to maintain controlled flight.

Even in the years after it entered service, the F-117 was a black project. Its existence was denied by USAF officials until 10 November 1988, when the aircraft was first publicly acknowledged. Its first combat mission was flown during the U.S. invasion of Panama in 1989. The last of the 59 production F-117s was delivered on 3 July 1990. The F-117 gained note in the Gulf War of 1991, during which it flew about 1,300 sorties and struck what the US military described as 1,600 high-value targets in Iraq. F-117s also participated in the conflict in Yugoslavia, during which one was shot down by a surface-to-air missile in 1999. It was also active during Operation Enduring Freedom in 2001 and Operation Iraqi Freedom in 2003. The USAF retired the F-117 in 2008, primarily because the F-22 Raptor had entered service, but has kept some aircraft in flying condition for research and development, testing, and training.

== Development ==
=== Background and Have Blue ===
In 1936, Robert Watson Watt, the British radar pioneer, noted that measures to reduce an object's radar cross-section (RCS) could be used to evade radar detection. In 1962, Pyotr Ufimtsev, a Soviet mathematician, published a seminal paper titled "Method of Edge Waves in the Physical Theory of Diffraction" in the Journal of the Moscow Institute for Radio Engineering, in which he showed that the strength of the radar return from an object is related to its edge configuration, not its size. Ufimtsev was extending theoretical work published by German physicist Arnold Sommerfeld. Ufimtsev demonstrated that he could calculate the RCS across a wing's surface and along its edge. The obvious and logical conclusion was that even a large aircraft could reduce its radar signature by exploiting this principle. However, the resulting design would make the aircraft aerodynamically unstable, and the state of computer technology in the early 1960s could not provide the kinds of flight computers that would later allow aircraft such as the F-117 and B-2 Spirit to stay airborne. By the 1970s, when Lockheed analyst Denys Overholser found Ufimtsev's paper, computers and software had advanced significantly, and the stage was set for the development of a stealth airplane.

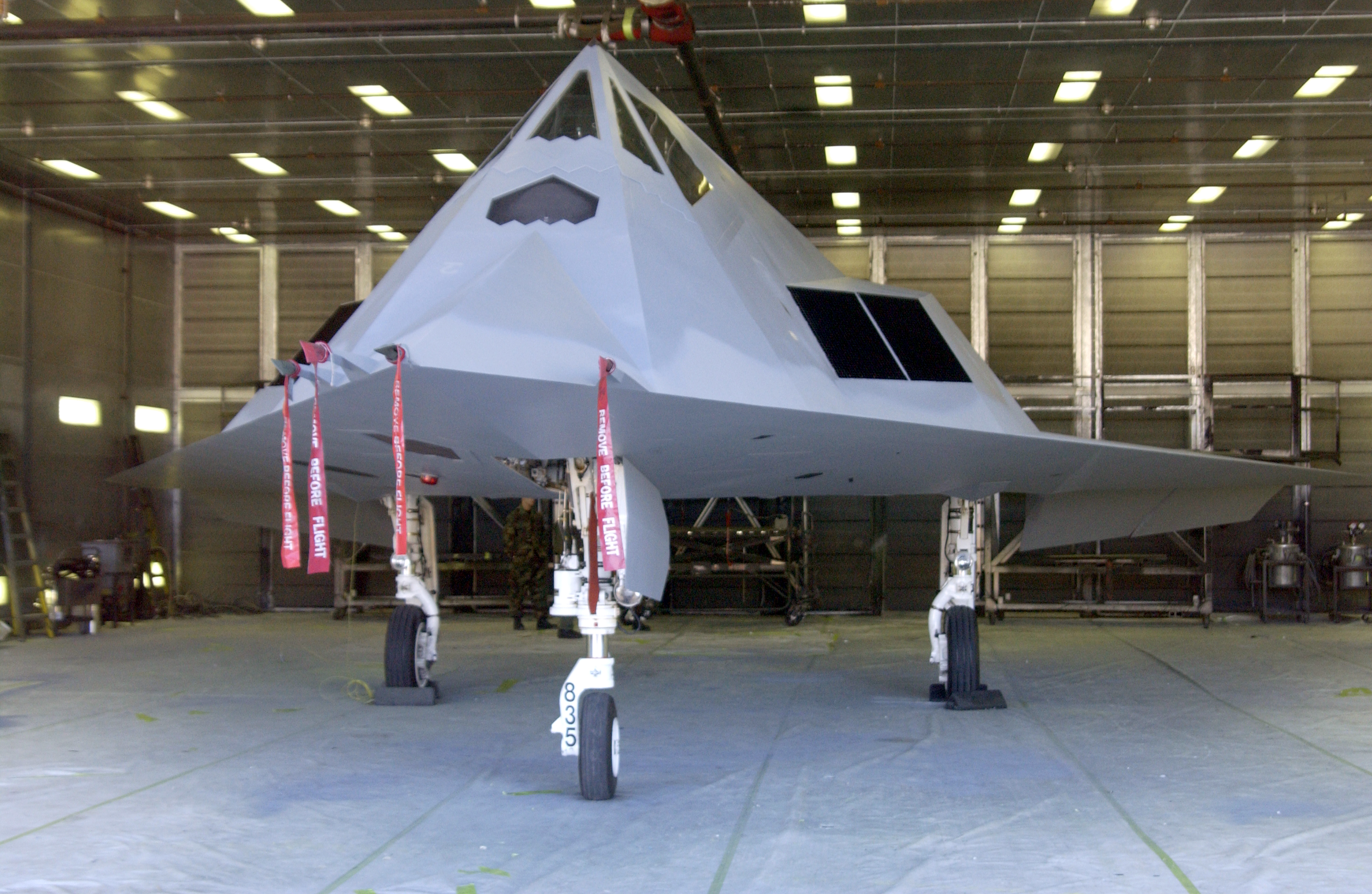
F-117A painted in "Gray Dragon" experimental camouflage scheme

The F-117 was conceived after the Vietnam War, where increasingly sophisticated Soviet surface-to-air missiles (SAMs) had downed heavy bombers. The heavy losses inflicted by Soviet-made SAMs upon the Israeli Air Force in the 1973 Yom Kippur War also contributed to a 1974 Defense Science Board assessment that in case of a conflict in Central Europe, air defenses would likely prevent NATO air strikes on targets in Eastern Europe.

It was a black project, remaining an ultrasecret program for much of its life. The project began in 1975 with a model called the "Hopeless Diamond" (a wordplay on the Hope Diamond because of its appearance). The following year, the DARPA issued Lockheed Skunk Works a contract to build and test two stealth strike fighters, under the code name "Have Blue". These subscale aircraft incorporated jet engines of the Northrop T-38A, fly-by-wire systems of the F-16, landing gear of the A-10, and environmental systems of the C-130. By bringing together existing technology and components, Lockheed built two demonstrators under budget, at $35 million for both aircraft, and in record time. Undersecretary of Defense for Research and Engineering William J. Perry was instrumental in shepherding the project.

The maiden flight of the demonstrators occurred on 1 December 1977. Although both aircraft crashed during the demonstration program, test data gathered proved positive. The success of Have Blue led the government to increase funding for stealth technology. Much of that increase was allocated towards the production of an operational stealth aircraft, the Lockheed F-117, under the program code name Senior Trend.

=== Senior Trend ===
The decision to produce the F-117 was made on 1 November 1978, and a contract was awarded to Lockheed Advanced Development Projects, popularly known as the Skunk Works, in Burbank, California. The program was led by Ben Rich, with Alan Brown as manager of the project. Rich called on Bill Schroeder, a Lockheed mathematician, and Overholser, a mathematician and radar specialist, to exploit Ufimtsev's work. The three designed a computer program called "Echo", which made possible the design of an airplane with flat panels, called facets, which were arranged so as to scatter over 99% of a radar's signal energy "painting" the aircraft.

The first YF-117A, serial number 79-10780, made its maiden flight from Groom Lake (Area 51), Nevada, on 18 June 1981, only 31 months after the full-scale development decision. The first production F-117A was delivered in 1982, and operational capability was achieved in October 1983. The 4450th Tactical Group stationed at Nellis Air Force Base, Nevada, was tasked with the operational development of the early F-117, and between 1981 (prior to the arrival of the first models) and 1989, the group used LTV A-7 Corsair IIs for training, to bring all pilots to a common flight-training baseline and later as chase planes for F-117A tests.

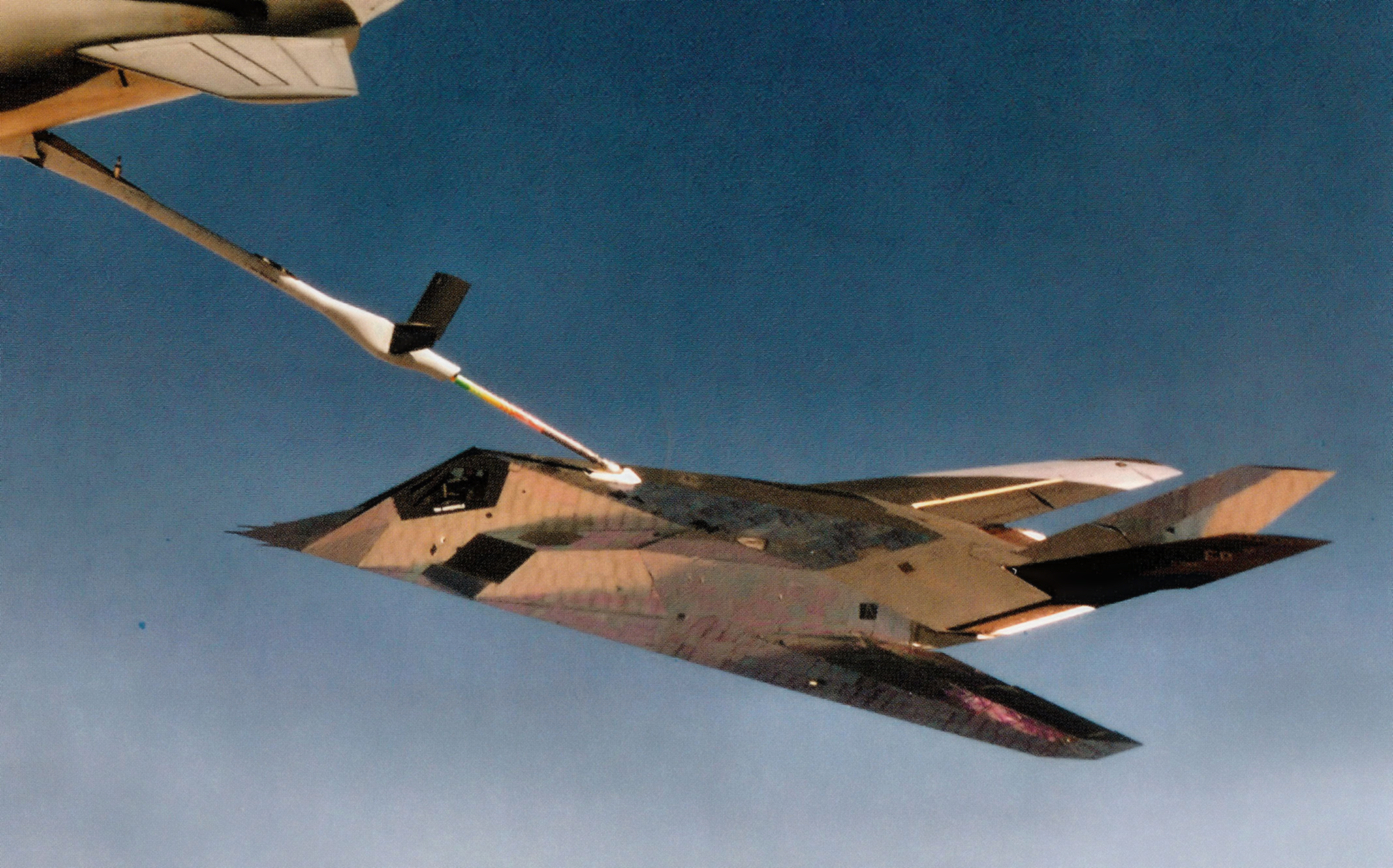
YF-117A 79-10784 being refueled by a Boeing KC-135 Stratotanker of the 4450th Tactical Group in 1983.

The F-117 was secret for much of the 1980s. Many news articles discussed what they called an "F-19" stealth fighter, and the Testor Corporation produced a very inaccurate scale model. When an F-117 crashed in Sequoia National Forest in July 1986, killing the pilot and starting a fire, the USAF established restricted airspace. Armed guards prohibited entry, including firefighters, and a helicopter gunship circled the site. All F-117 debris was replaced with remains of a F-101A Voodoo crash stored at Area 51. When another fatal crash in October 1987 occurred inside Nellis, the military again provided little information to the press.

The USAF denied the existence of the aircraft until 10 November 1988, when Assistant Secretary of Defense J. Daniel Howard displayed a grainy photograph at a Pentagon press conference, disproving the many inaccurate rumors about the shape of the "F-19". After the announcement, pilots could fly the F-117 during daytime and no longer needed to be associated with the A-7, flying the T-38 supersonic trainer for travel and training, instead. In April 1990, two F-117s flew to Nellis, arriving during daylight, and publicly displayed to a crowd of tens of thousands.

F-117 flight demonstration

Five full-scale development aircraft were built, designated "YF-117A". The last of 59 production F-117s was delivered on 3 July 1990. As the USAF has stated, "Streamlined management by Aeronautical Systems Center, Wright-Patterson AFB, Ohio, combined breakthrough stealth technology with concurrent development and production to rapidly field the aircraft... The F-117A program demonstrates that a stealth aircraft can be designed for reliability and maintainability."

=== Designation ===
The operational aircraft was officially designated "F-117A". Most modern U.S. military aircraft use post-1962 designations in which the designation "F" is usually an air-to-air fighter, "B" is usually a bomber, "A" is usually a ground-attack aircraft, etc. (Examples include the F-15, the B-2, and the A-6.) The F-117 is primarily an attack aircraft, so its "F" designation is inconsistent with the Department of Defense system. This inconsistency has been repeatedly employed by the USAF with several of its attack aircraft since the late 1950s, including the Republic F-105 Thunderchief and General Dynamics F-111 Aardvark. A televised documentary quoted project manager Alan Brown as saying that Robert J. Dixon, a four-star USAF general who was the head of Tactical Air Command, felt that the top-notch USAF fighter pilots required to fly the new aircraft were more easily attracted to an aircraft with an "F" designation for fighter, as opposed to a bomber ("B") or attack ("A") designation. Early on, one potential air-to-air mission considered for the F-117 was to hunt down the Soviet A-50 "Mainstay" airborne warning and control system. However, this was not deemed to be effective and this mission was passed to the nascent Advanced Tactical Fighter, which eventually became the F-22 Raptor.

The designation "F-117" seems to indicate that it was given an official designation prior to the 1962 U.S. Tri-Service Aircraft Designation System and could be considered numerically to be a part of the earlier Century Series of fighters. The assumption prior to the revealing of the aircraft to the public was that it would likely receive the F-19 designation, as that number had not been used, but no other aircraft were to receive a "100" series number following the F-111. Soviet fighters obtained by the U.S. via various means under the Constant Peg program were given F-series numbers for their evaluation by U.S. pilots, and with the advent of the Teen Series fighters, most often Century Series designations.

As with other exotic military aircraft types flying in the southern Nevada area, such as captured fighters, an arbitrary radio call of "117" was assigned. This same radio call had been used by the enigmatic 4477th Test and Evaluation Squadron, also known as the "Red Hats" or "Red Eagles", who often had flown expatriated MiG jet fighters in the area, but no relationship existed between the call and the formal F-19 designation then being considered by the USAF. Apparently, use of the "117" radio call became commonplace, and when Lockheed released its first flight manual (i.e., the USAF "dash one" manual for the aircraft), F-117A was the designation printed on the cover.

== Design ==
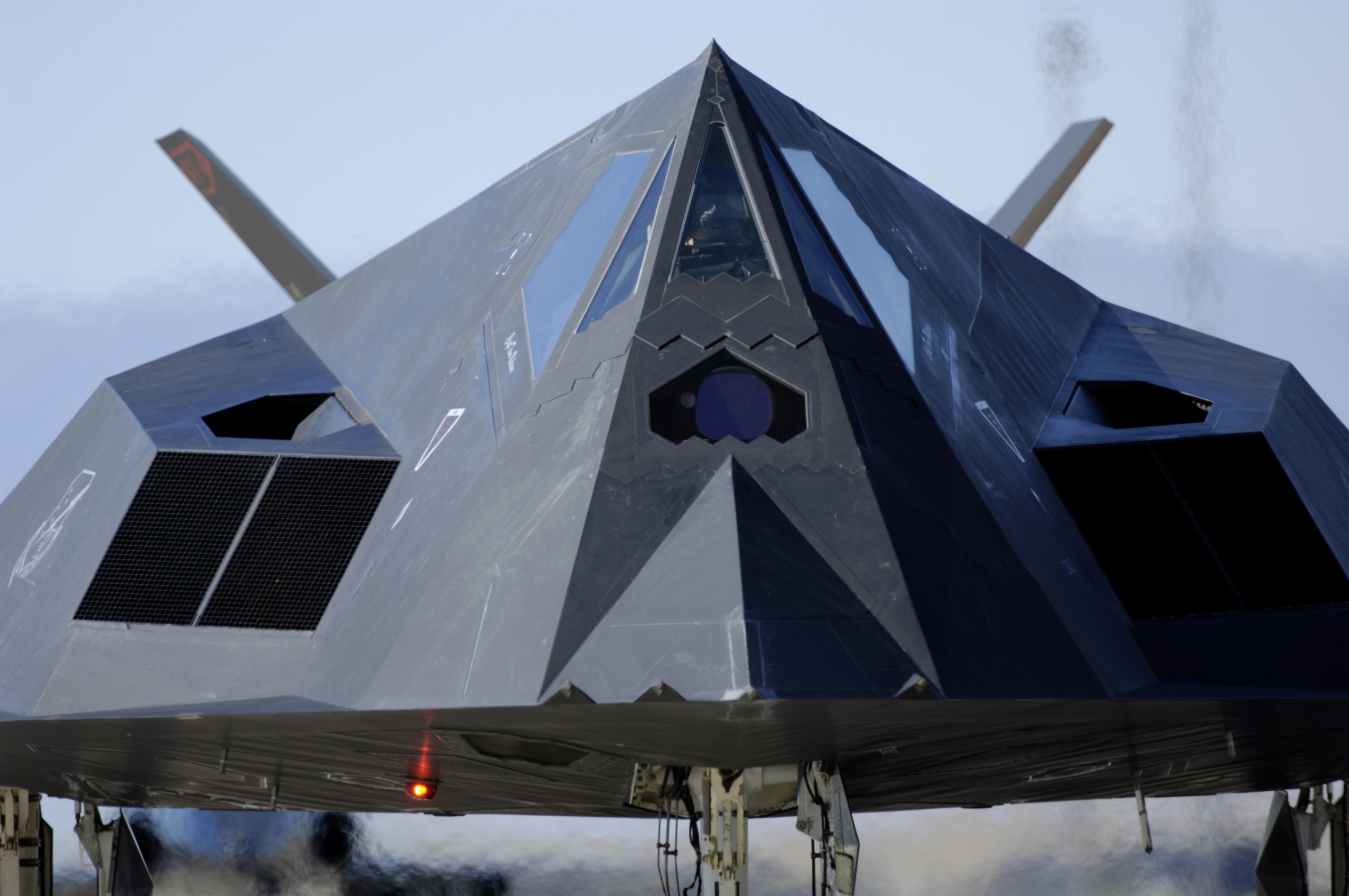
Front view of an F-117

When the USAF first approached Lockheed with the stealth concept, Skunk Works Director Kelly Johnson proposed a rounded design. He believed smoothly blended shapes offered the best combination of speed and stealth. However, his assistant, Ben Rich, showed that faceted-angle surfaces would provide a significant reduction in radar signature, and the necessary aerodynamic control could be provided with computer units. A May 1975 Skunk Works report, "Progress Report No. 2, High Stealth Conceptual Studies", showed the rounded concept that was rejected in favor of the flat-sided approach. The resulting unusual design surprised and puzzled experienced pilots; a Royal Air Force pilot who flew it as an exchange officer stated that when he first saw a photograph of the still-secret F-117, he "promptly giggled and thought [to himself] 'this clearly can't fly'".

The single-seat F-117 is powered by two nonafterburning General Electric F404 turbofan engines. They were extensively modified to suit a stealth aircraft, such as to have a cooler operational temperature, and somewhat resembled a turbojet, instead. The engine was redesigned to produce a minimum of mass thrust, which eased the task of designing a suitable inlet and nozzle. To obscure the engine from enemy radar, a conductive metal mesh grill was installed in the intake, while the exhaust gases were intentionally mixed with cool air to lower the thermal signature.

The aircraft is air refuelable and features a V-tail. The maximum speed is 623 mph (1,003 km/h; 541 kn) at high altitude, the maximum rate of climb is 2,820 feet (860 m) per minute, and the service ceiling is 43,000 to 45,000 feet (13,000 to 14,000 m). The cockpit was quite spacious, with ergonomic displays and controls, but the field of view was somewhat obstructed with a large blind spot to the rear.

=== Avionics ===
Early stealth aircraft were designed with a focus on minimal radar cross-section rather than aerodynamic performance; because of this, the F-117 is aerodynamically unstable in all three aircraft principal axes and requires constant flight corrections from a fly-by-wire (FBW) flight system to maintain controlled flight. It is equipped with quadruple-redundant FBW flight controls. To lower development costs, the avionics, FBW systems, and other systems and parts were derived from the General Dynamics F-16 Fighting Falcon, Boeing B-52 Stratofortress, McDonnell Douglas F/A-18 Hornet, and McDonnell Douglas F-15E Strike Eagle. To maintain a high level of secrecy, components were often rerouted from other aircraft programs, ordered using falsified addresses and other details, while $3 million worth of equipment was removed from USAF storage without disclosing its purpose.

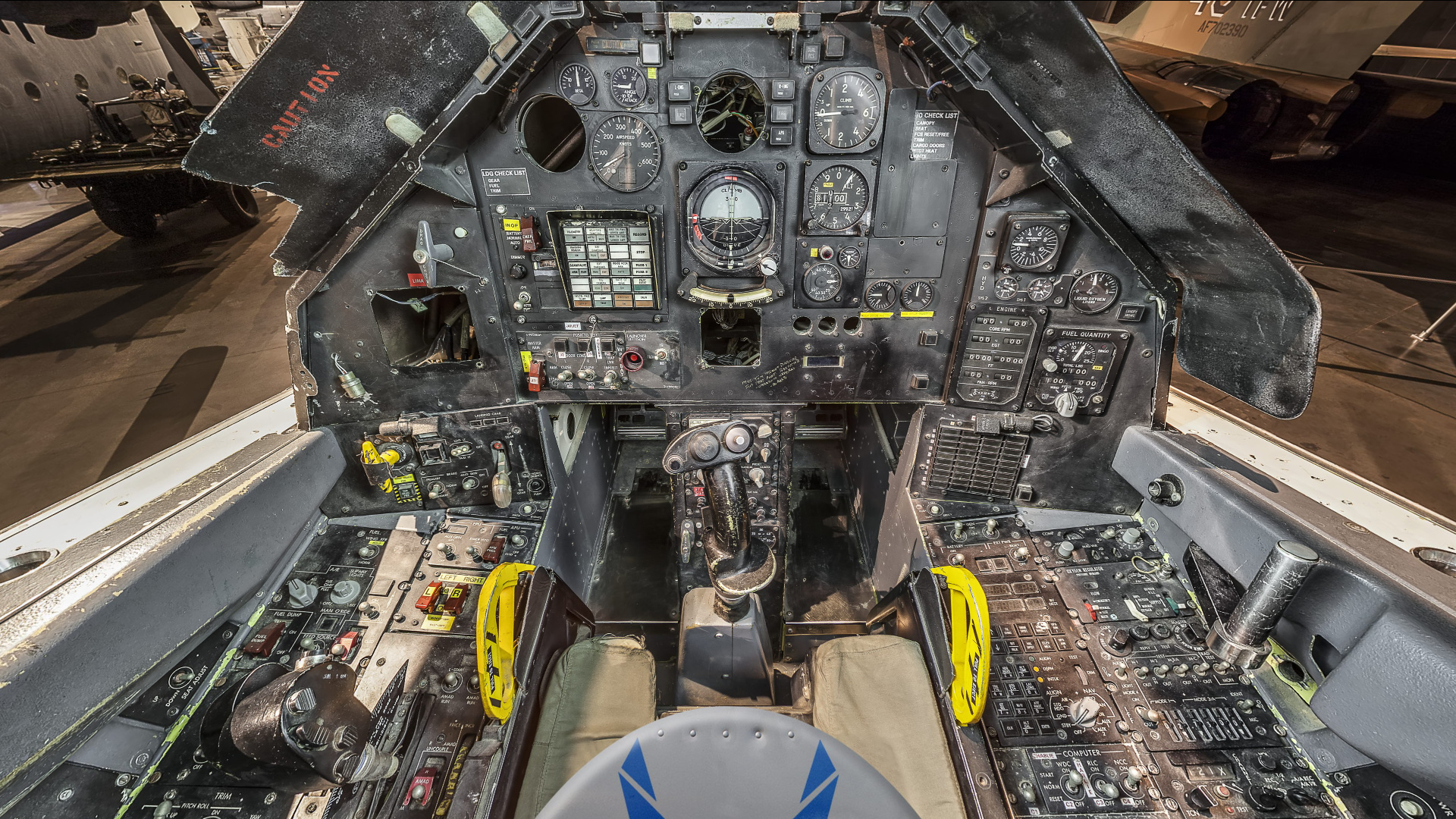
YF-117A cockpit

The aircraft is equipped with sophisticated navigation and attack systems integrated into a digital avionics suite. It navigates primarily by GPS and high-accuracy inertial navigation. Missions are coordinated by an automated planning system that can automatically perform all aspects of an attack mission, including weapons release. Targets are acquired by a thermal imaging, infrared system, paired with a laser rangefinder/laser designator that finds the range and designates targets for laser-guided bombs. The F-117's split internal bay can carry 5,000 pounds (2,300 kg) of ordnance. Typical weapons are a pair of GBU-10, GBU-12, or GBU-27 laser-guided bombs, two BLU-109 penetration bombs, or, after 2006, two Joint Direct Attack Munitions (JDAM) GPS/INS-guided stand-off bombs.

=== Stealth ===
The F-117 has an RCS around 0.001 m^{2} (0.0108 sq ft). Among the penalties for stealth are subsonic speeds to prevent frame heating, heat on the engine inlet and outlet prevent certain thrusting maneuvers, a very low wing aspect ratio, and a high sweep angle (50°), needed to deflect incoming radar waves to the sides. With these design considerations and no afterburner, the F-117 is limited to subsonic speeds. Additionally, to maintain its low observability, the F-117 was not equipped with radar; not only would an active radar be detectable through its emissions, but an inactive radar antenna would also act as a reflector of radar energy. Whether it carries any radar detection equipment remained classified as of 2008.

Its faceted shape (made from two-dimensional flat surfaces) resulted from the limitations of the 1970s-era computer technology used to calculate its RCS. Later supercomputers made subsequent aircraft like the B-2 bomber made using curved surfaces while maintaining stealth possible, through the use of far more computational resources to perform the additional calculations. The F-117 was covered by almost one ton of radio-wave absorbing materials, manufactured as flat sheets. The sheets were held in place by glue, with the gaps between filled by a kind of putty material called "butter".

An exhaust plume contributes a significant infrared (IR) signature. The F-117 reduces IR signature with a noncircular tail pipe (a slit shape) to minimize the exhaust cross-section and maximize the mixing of hot exhaust with cool, ambient air. The F-117 lacks afterburners, because the hot exhaust would increase the infrared signature, breaking the sound barrier would produce an obvious sonic boom, and surface heating of the aircraft skin would also increase the IR footprint. As a result, its performance in air combat maneuvering required in a dogfight would never match that of a dedicated fighter aircraft; this was unimportant in the case of the F-117, since it was a dedicated attack aircraft.

Passive (multistatic) radar, bistatic radar, and especially multistatic radar systems detect some stealth aircraft better than conventional monostatic radars, since first-generation stealth technology (such as the F-117) reflects energy away from the transmitter's line of sight, effectively increasing the RCS in other directions, which the passive radars monitor.

=== Nuclear capability ===
While the F-117 was designed with the capability to deliver nuclear weapons, it never served in a standardized nuclear role, instead being kept at a lower, latent, or reserve nuclear readiness. It could store and drop two nuclear gravity bombs, including the B57 and B61. Its cockpit had a panel for interfacing with the nuclear weapons' permissive action links.

It was an ideal aircraft for potential nuclear strategic bombing attacks against the Soviet Union, not only for its stealth shape and paint, but also its flight-planning software that allowed it to minimize exposure to the Warsaw Pact's dense antiaircraft forces. Forward deployments were considered to the United Kingdom and South Korea, but abandoned due to concerns about the aircraft's sensitive technology. In 1985, the aircraft experienced a shaking issue while test dropping a dummy B61 nuclear bomb at Groom Lake in Area 51.

F-117 pilots were trained for specific conventional (GBU-27) attack missions against the Warsaw Pact from airfields in the United Kingdom in what theoretically would be the opening non-nuclear phases of World War III. One pilot was assigned a target in Rostock, East Germany.

== Operational history ==
=== Early activities ===
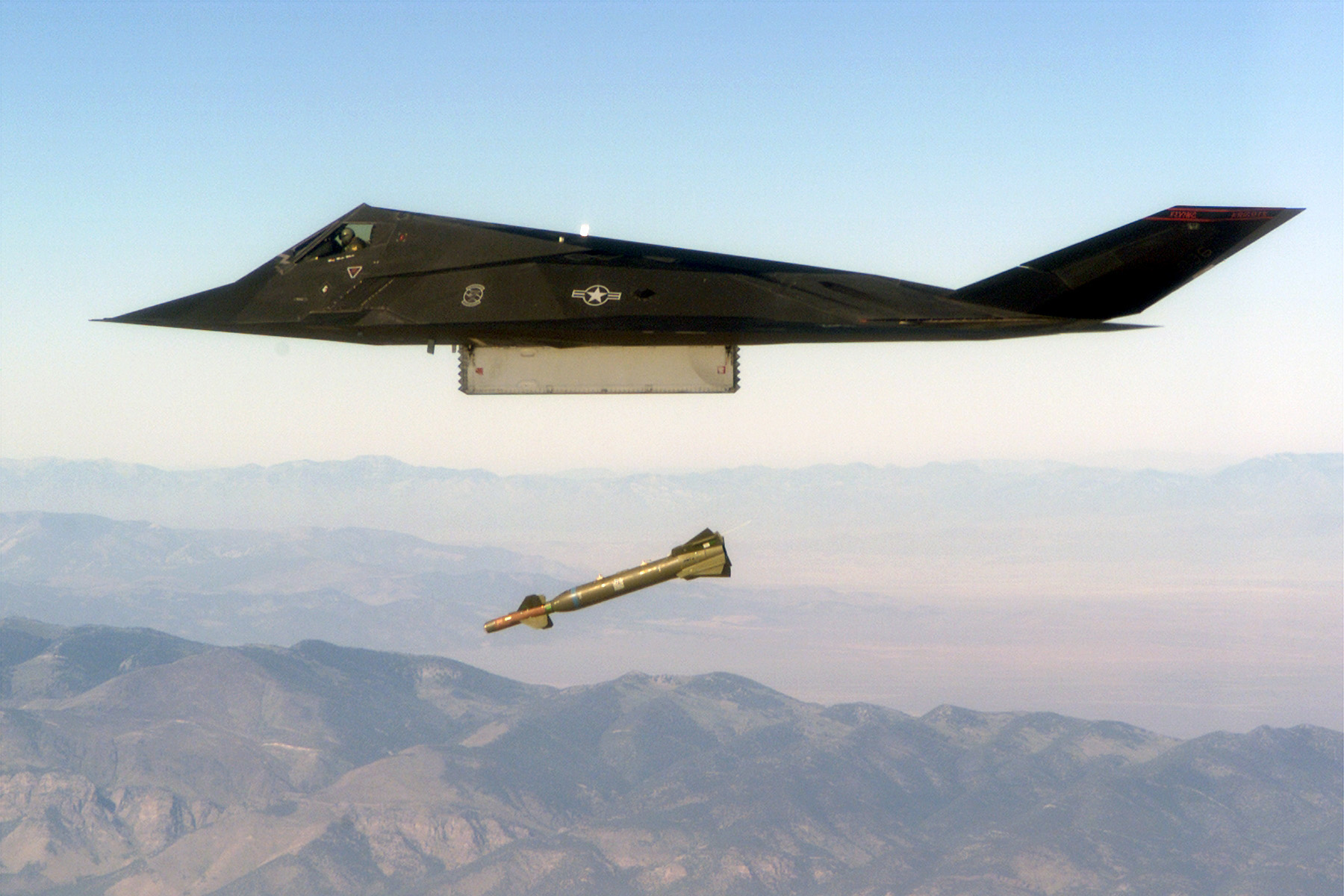
An F-117 conducts a live-exercise bombing run using GBU-27 laser-guided bombs.

During the program's early years, from 1984 to mid-1992, the F-117 fleet was based at Tonopah Test Range Airport, Nevada, where it served under the 4450th Tactical Group; Air Combat Command's only F-117A unit. The unit was headquartered at Nellis Air Force Base. A-7 Corsair II aircraft were used for training. Most personnel and their families lived in Las Vegas. This required commercial air and trucking to transport personnel between Las Vegas and Tonopah each week. The 4450th was absorbed by the 37th Tactical Fighter Wing in 1989. In 1992, the entire fleet was transferred to Holloman Air Force Base, New Mexico, under the command of the 49th Fighter Wing.

The F-117 reached initial operating capability status in 1983. The Nighthawk's pilots called themselves "Bandits". Each of the 558 Air Force pilots who have flown the F-117 has a Bandit number, such as "Bandit 52", that indicates the sequential order of their first flight in the F-117. Pilots told friends and families that they flew the Northrop F-5 in aggressor squadrons against Tactical Air Command.

The F-117 has been used several times in war. Its first mission was during the United States invasion of Panama in 1989. During that invasion, at least two F-117s dropped bombs on Rio Hato airfield.

The aircraft was operated in secret from Tonopah for almost a decade; after the Gulf War, all aircraft moved to Holloman in 1992, but its integration with the USAF's nonstealth "iron jets" occurred slowly. As one senior F-117 pilot later said: "Because of ongoing secrecy, others continued to see the aircraft as 'none of their business, a stand-alone system'." The F-117 and members of the 49th Fighter Wing were deployed to Southwest Asia on multiple occasions. On their first deployment, with the aid of aerial refueling, pilots flew nonstop from Holloman to Kuwait, around an 18.5-hour flight.

=== Iraq and Afghanistan ===
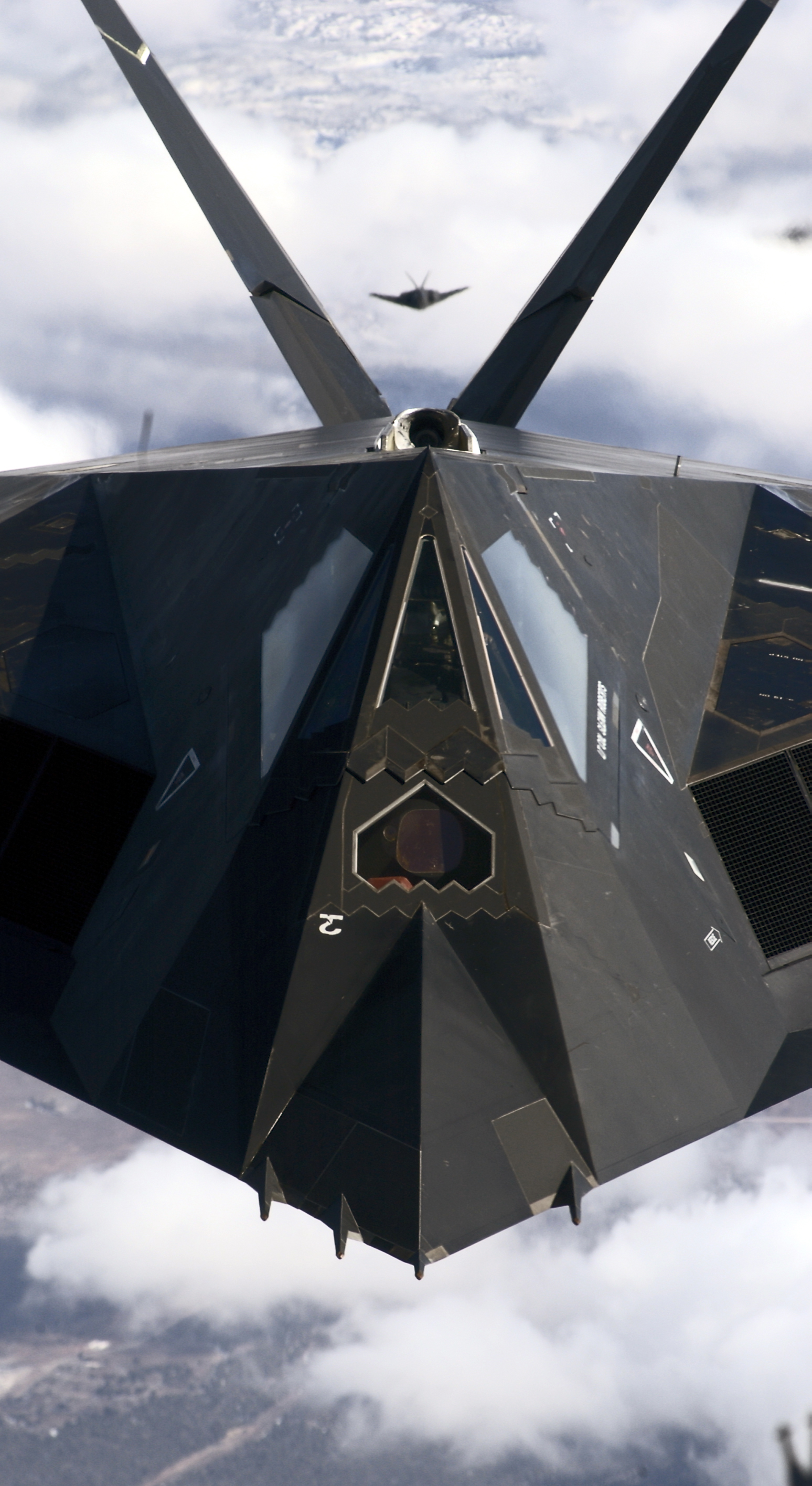
A pair of F-117s

During the Gulf War in 1991, the F-117 flew roughly 1,300 sorties and scored direct hits on what the U.S. called 1,600 high-value targets in Iraq over 6,905 flight hours. Leaflet drops on Iraqi forces displayed the F-117 destroying ground targets and warned "Escape now and save yourselves". Only 229 Coalition tactical aircraft could drop and designate laser-guided bombs, of which 36 F-117s represented 15.7%, and only the USAF had the I-2000 bombs intended for hardened targets. So, the F-117 represented 32% of all coalition aircraft that could deliver such bombs. Notably, F-117s were involved in the Amiriyah shelter bombing, killing at least 408 civilians.

Much media attention was given to the bombing of telecommunications, water, and transportation infrastructure in Baghdad. Stealth bombers were used due to the perimeter of Baghdad being heavily defended with antiaircraft weapons. The bombings quickly became part of a propaganda battle, with media highlighting the killing of civilians and American claims that stealth bombing was highly effective at destroying military targets. Postwar records show that the F-117 had 18 times more targets per aircraft than their nonstealth peers.

Outside of Baghdad, the F-117 bombing was primarily used to destroy airfields, and it was used in conjunction with other air munitions. Overall, 42 F-117s dropped 2077 bombs in Desert Storm. This accounts for about a third of USAF guided bombing.

Early claims of the F-117's effectiveness were later found to be overstated. Initial reports of F-117s hitting 80% of their targets were later scaled back to "41–60%". On the first night, they failed to hit 40% of their assigned air-defense targets, including the Air Defense Operations Center in Baghdad, and eight such targets remained functional out of 10 that could be assessed. In their Desert Storm white paper, the USAF stated, "the F-117 was the only airplane that the planners dared risk over downtown Baghdad" and that this area was particularly well defended. (Dozens of F-16s were routinely tasked to attack Baghdad in the first few days of the war.) In fact, most of the air defenses were on the outskirts of the city and many other aircraft hit targets in the downtown area, with minimal casualties when they attacked at night like the F-117; they avoided the optically aimed antiaircraft cannon and infrared SAMs, which were the biggest threat to Coalition aircraft.

The F-117 was used during Operation Enduring Freedom in 2001. The Taliban lacked a modern air force. After the initial bombing campaign in October, targets justifying F-117 usage were limited, as was the use of the F-117.

The first bombs dropped in the 2003 Operation Iraqi Freedom were from two F-117s on the Dora Farms in an attempt to assassinate Saddam Hussein. The F-117 was chosen to deliver a bunker-buster payload because nearby Baghdad was heavily fortified with antiaircraft weapons, and US intelligence indicated Saddam Hussein's bunker was too reinforced for missiles. The EGBU-27 Advanced Paveway III bunker buster is an unusual payload for the F-117. Post facto intelligence showed that Saddam Hussein had been at Dora Farms, but left several hours prior to the bombing. During this time, the USAF estimated the operational cost as $35,000 per JDAM-style bomb delivered by the F-117.

=== Yugoslavia ===
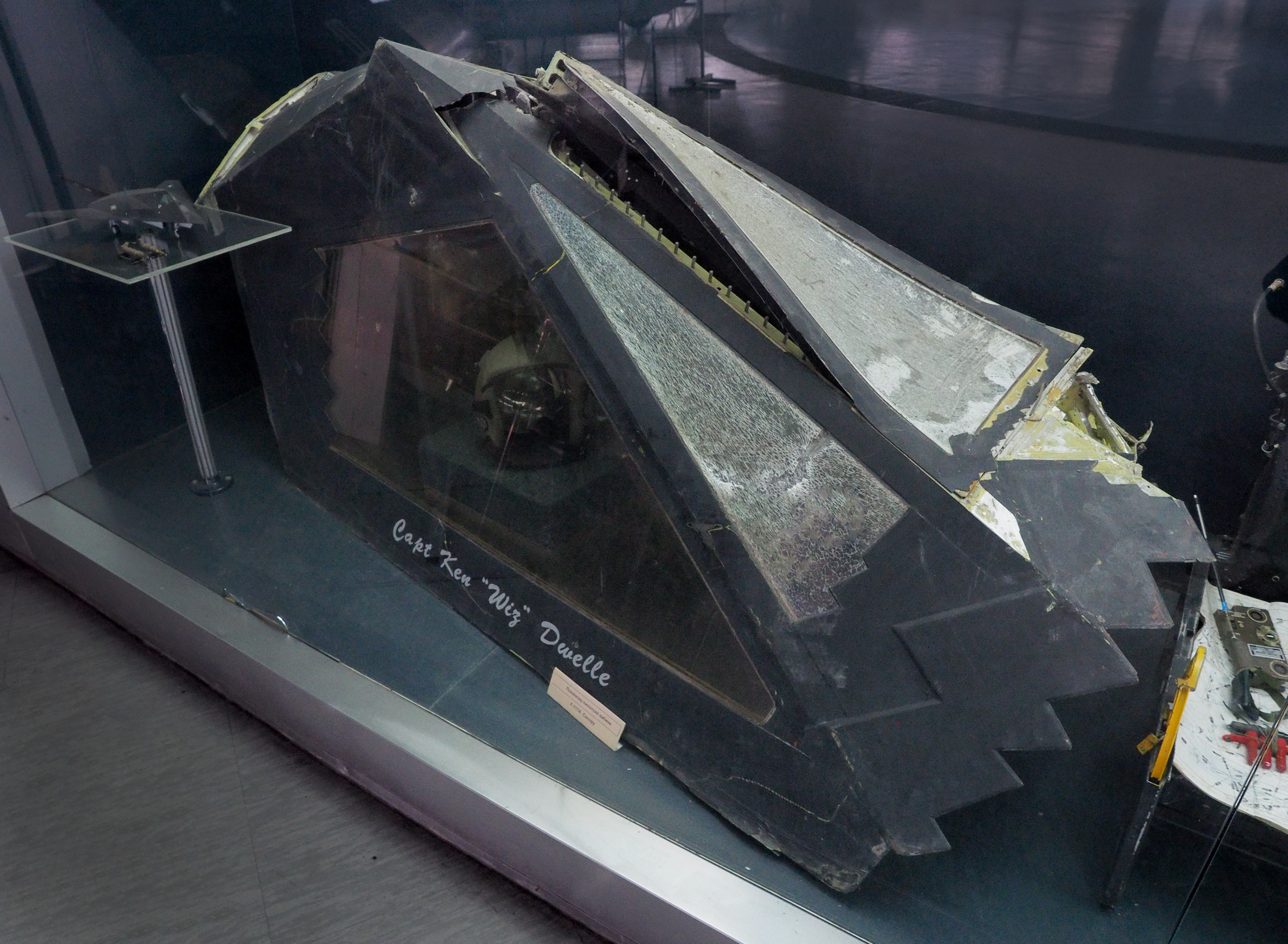
Canopy of F-117 shot down in Serbia in March 1999 at the Museum of Aviation in Belgrade

One F-117 (AF ser. no. 82-0806) was lost to enemy action. It was downed during an Operation Allied Force mission against the Army of Yugoslavia on 27 March 1999. The aircraft was shot down at a distance of 8.1 mi (13 km) and an altitude of 26,000 ft (8 km). SA-3s were then launched by a Yugoslav version of the Soviet Isayev S-125 "Neva" (NATO name SA-3 "Goa") antiaircraft missile system. The launcher was run by the 3rd Battalion of the 250th Air Defence Missile Brigade under the command of Colonel Zoltán Dani. After the explosion, the aircraft became uncontrollable, forcing the pilot to eject. The pilot was recovered six hours later by a USAF pararescue team. The stealth technology from the downed F-117 has reportedly been studied by Russia, and possibly China. The U.S. did not attempt to destroy the wreckage; senior Pentagon officials claimed that its technology was already dated and no longer important to protect.

American sources state that a second F-117 was targeted and damaged during the campaign, allegedly on 30 April 1999. The aircraft returned to Spangdahlem Air Base, but it supposedly never flew again. The USAF continued using the F-117 during Operation Allied Force.

=== Program closeout ===
The loss of an F-117 in Serbia caused the USAF to create a subsection of its existing weapons school to improve tactics. More training was done with other units, and the F-117 began to participate in Red Flag exercises. Though advanced for its time, the F-117's stealthy faceted airframe required a large amount of maintenance and was eventually superseded by streamlined shapes produced with computer-aided design. Other weapons systems began to take on the F-117's roles, such as the F-22 Raptor gaining the ability to drop guided bombs. By 2005, the aircraft was used only for certain missions, such as if a pilot needed to verify that the correct target had been hit, or when minimal collateral damage was vital.

The USAF had once planned to retire the F-117 in 2011, but Program Budget Decision 720 (PBD 720), dated 28 December 2005, proposed retiring it by October 2008 to free up an estimated $1.07 billion to buy more F-22s. PBD 720 called for 10 F-117s to be retired in FY2007 and the remaining 42 in FY2008, stating that other USAF planes and missiles could stealthily deliver precision ordnance, including the B-2 Spirit, F-22, and JASSM. The planned introduction of the multirole F-35 Lightning II also contributed to the retirement decision.

In late 2006, the USAF closed the F-117 formal training unit, and announced the retirement of the F-117. The first six aircraft to be retired took their last flight on 12 March 2007 after a ceremony at Holloman AFB to commemorate the aircraft's career. Brigadier General David L. Goldfein, commander of the 49th Fighter Wing, said at the ceremony, "With the launch of these great aircraft today, the circle comes to a close—their service to our nation's defense fulfilled, their mission accomplished, and a job well done. We send them today to their final resting place—a home they are intimately familiar with—their first, and only, home outside of Holloman."

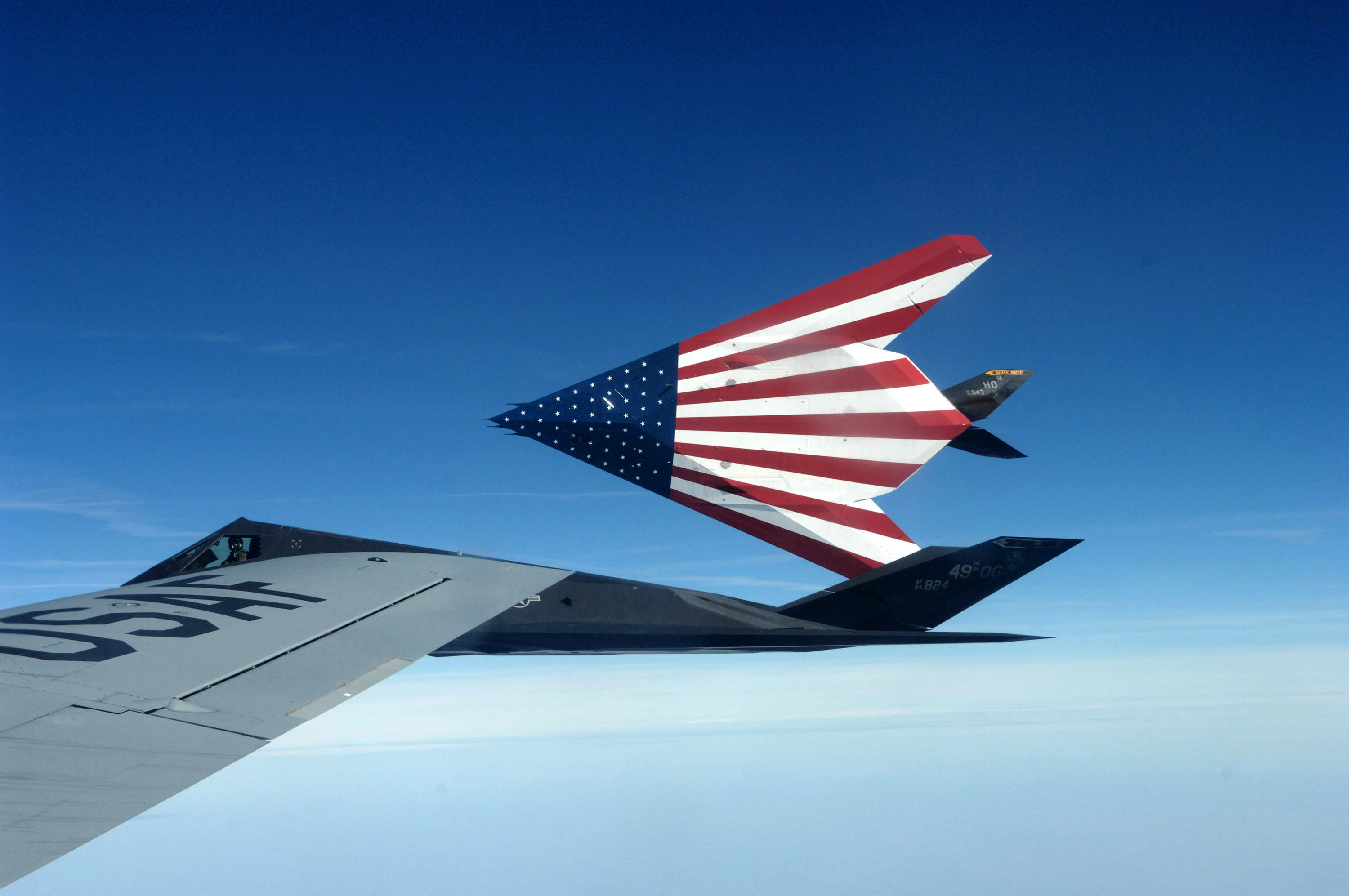
A pair of specially painted F-117s sporting a United States flag theme on their bellies fly off from their last refueling by the Ohio Air National Guard's 121st Air Refueling Wing.

Unlike most other USAF aircraft that are retired to Davis-Monthan AFB for scrapping, or dispersal to museums, most of the F-117s were placed in "Type 1000" storage in their original hangars at the Tonopah Test Range Airport. At Tonopah, their wings were removed and the aircraft are stored in their original climate-controlled hangars. The decommissioning occurred in eight phases, with the operational aircraft retired to Tonopah in seven waves from 13 March 2007 until the last wave's arrival on 22 April 2008. Four aircraft were kept flying beyond April by the 410th Flight Test Squadron at Palmdale for flight tests. By August, two were remaining. The last F-117 (AF Serial No. 86-0831) left Palmdale to fly to Tonopah on 11 August 2008. With the last aircraft retired, the 410th was inactivated in a ceremony on 1 August 2008.

Five aircraft were placed in museums, including the first four YF-117As and some remains of the F-117 shot down over Serbia. Through 2009, one F-117 had been scrapped; AF Serial No. 79-0784 was scrapped at the Palmdale test facility on 26 April 2008. It was the last F-117 at Palmdale and was scrapped to test an effective method for destroying these planes.

Congress had ordered that all F-117s mothballed from 30 September 2006 onwards were to be maintained "in a condition that would allow recall of that aircraft to future service" as part of the 2007 National Defense Authorization Act. As of 2022, USAF plans to demilitarize three F-117s each year until 2034, when they should all be demilitarized.

=== Postretirement service ===
The USAF is currently using the aircraft in aggressor squadron and cruise missile training, and research and development. USAF has also slowed the retirement of its current inventory of about 45 F-117s to two to three units a year. This plan should extend the lifetime of the F-117 program to 2034. In March 2019, four F-117s reportedly had been secretly deployed to the Middle East in 2016, and one had to make an emergency landing at Ali Al Salem, Kuwait, sometime late that year.

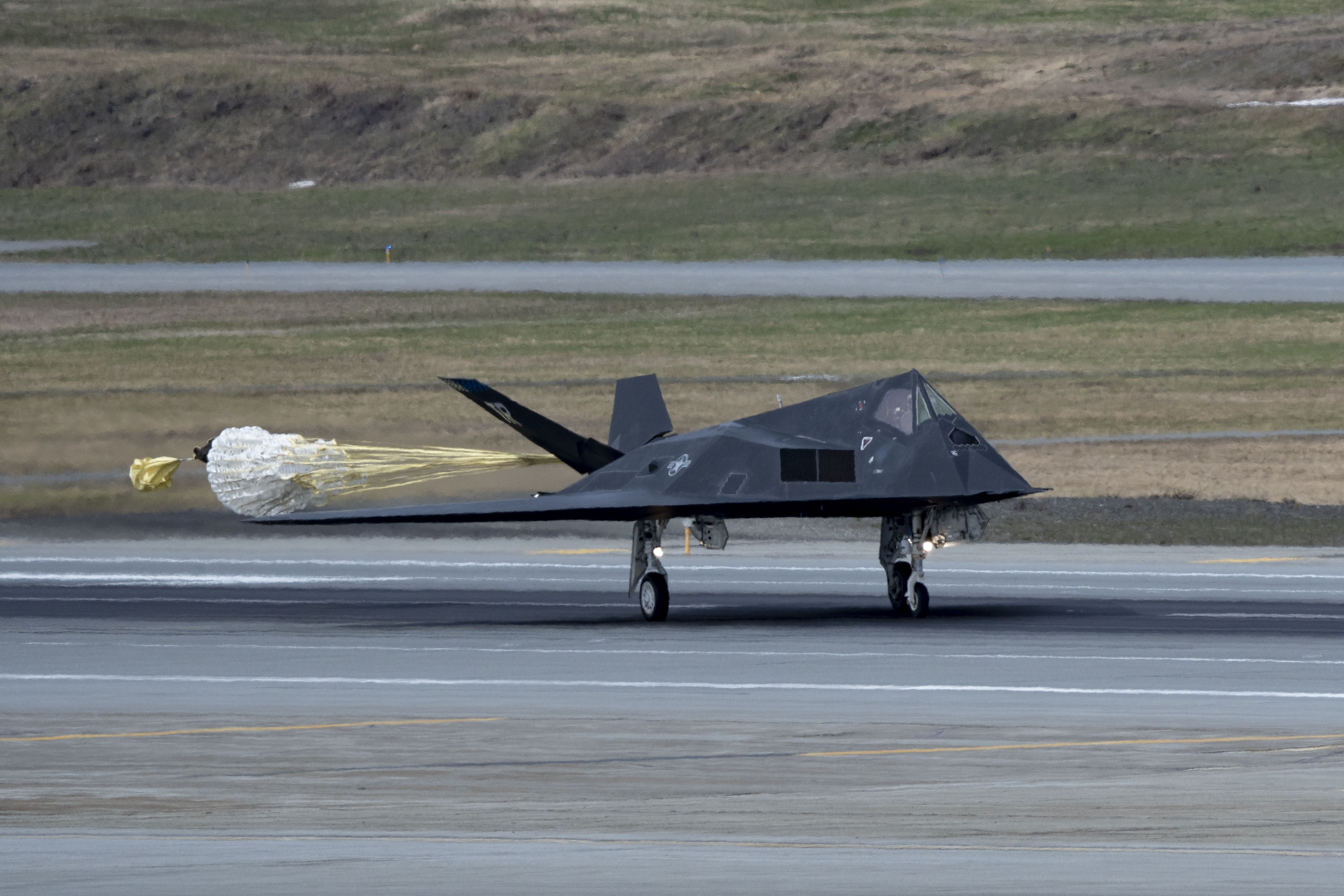
F-117 Nighthawk during Northern Edge 23–1 at Joint Base Elmendorf-Richardson, Alaska, May 2023

On 13 September 2021, a pair of F-117s landed at Fresno Yosemite International Airport in California. They were scheduled to train with the California Air National Guard F-15C/D Eagles of the 144th Fighter Wing over the next few days. One aircraft had red letters on its tail, and the other had white letters. One of the two was observed to not be fitted with radar reflectors. That year, USAF published photographs on DVIDS, the first acknowledgement by the service that the aircraft continued to fly after its official retirement.

In January 2022, two F-117s were observed in flight in the Saline Military Operating Area. One had portions of its exterior covered in a "mirror-like coating" believed to be an experimental treatment to reduce the aircraft's infrared signature.

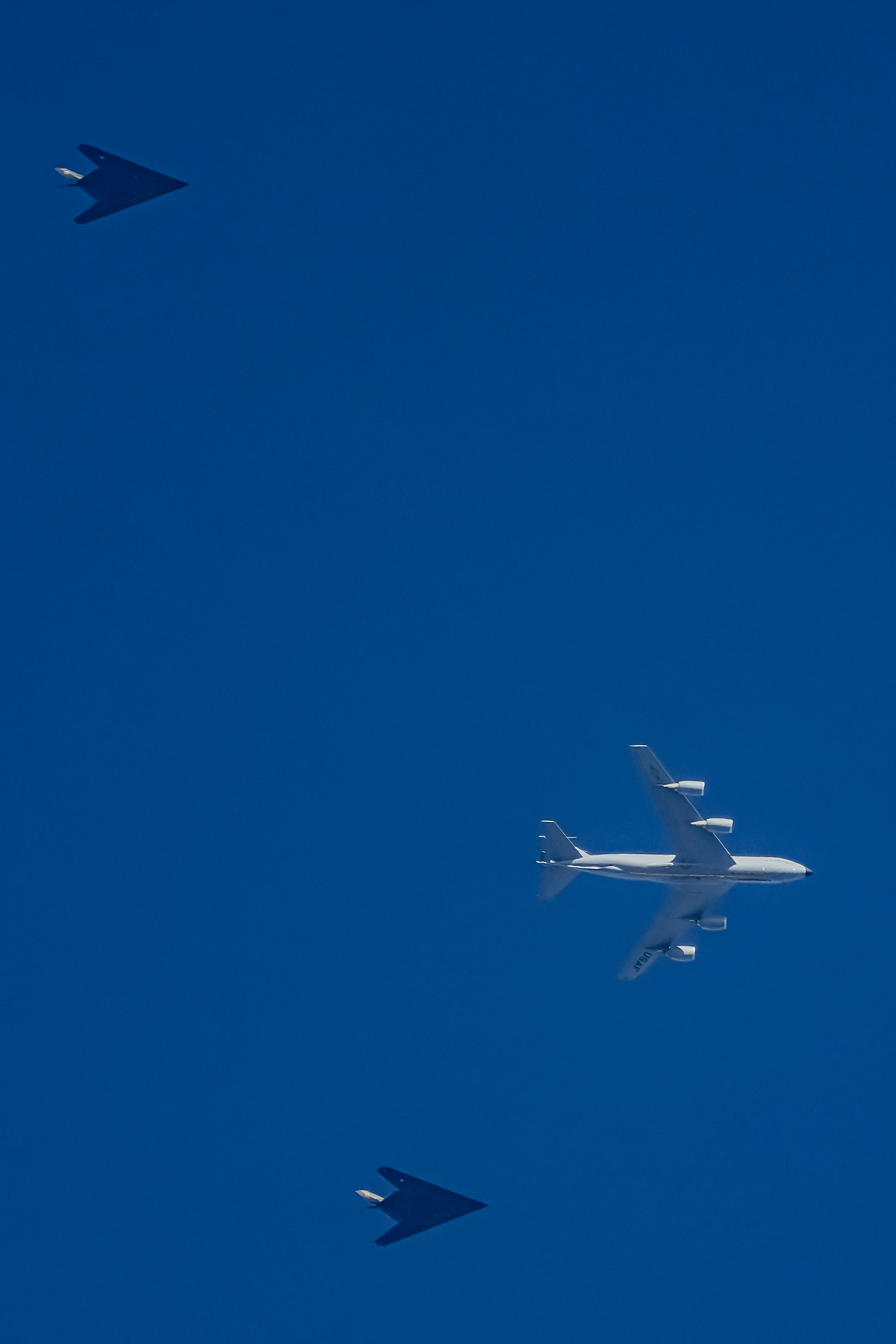
F-117s trailing a KC-135 Stratotanker, October 2023

In May 2022, an F-117 participated in exercise Savannah Sentry at the Air Dominance Center in Savannah, Georgia. It was a joint exercise with both active USAF and Air National Guard units. In a video documenting the exercise, an off-screen crew member stated that about 48 flyable F-117s are in USAF inventory. They stated that the F-117 is sometimes used in aggressor-type training roles and was brought to Savannah Sentry to participate in an "unclassified capacity".

In May 2023, two F-117s participated in exercise Northern Edge 23–1, marking the first time they were officially spotted operating outside of the continental US after their retirement. On 1 February 2024, two F-117s were seen at testing range R-2508 in the Mojave Desert.

In September 2025, two F-117s were spotted above Los Angeles being refueled by a USAF KC-46 Pegasus tanker. This marks the first time the two have been spotted transferring fuel to one another.

== Variants ==
=== F-117N "Sea Hawk" ===
The United States Navy tested the F-117 in 1984, but determined it was unsuitable for carrier use. In the early 1990s, Lockheed proposed an upgraded carrier-capable F-117 variant dubbed the "Seahawk" to the Navy as an alternative to the canceled A/F-X program. The unsolicited proposal was received poorly by the Department of Defense, which lacked interest in the single-mission capabilities on offer, particularly as it would take money away from the Joint Advanced Strike Technology program, which evolved into the Joint Strike Fighter. The F-117N would have differed from the land-based F-117 in several ways, such as the use of "elevators, a bubble canopy, a less sharply swept wing and reconfigured tail". It would also be re-engined with General Electric F414 turbofans in place of the General Electric F404s. The aircraft would be optionally fitted with hardpoints, allowing for an additional 8,000 lb (3,600 kg) of payload, and a new ground-attack radar with air-to-air capability. In that role, the F-117N could carry AIM-120 AMRAAM air-to-air missiles.

=== F-117B ===
After being rebuffed by the Navy, Lockheed submitted an updated proposal that included afterburning capability and a larger emphasis on the F-117N as a multimission aircraft, rather than just an attack aircraft. To boost interest, Lockheed also proposed an F-117B land-based variant that shared most of the F-117N capabilities. This variant was proposed to the USAF and RAF. Two RAF pilots formally evaluated the aircraft in 1986 as a reward for British help with the American bombing of Libya that year. RAF exchange officers began flying the F-117 in 1987, but the British declined an offer during the Reagan administration to purchase the aircraft. This renewed F-117N proposal was also known as the A/F-117X. Neither the F-117N nor the F-117B was ordered.

== Operators ==
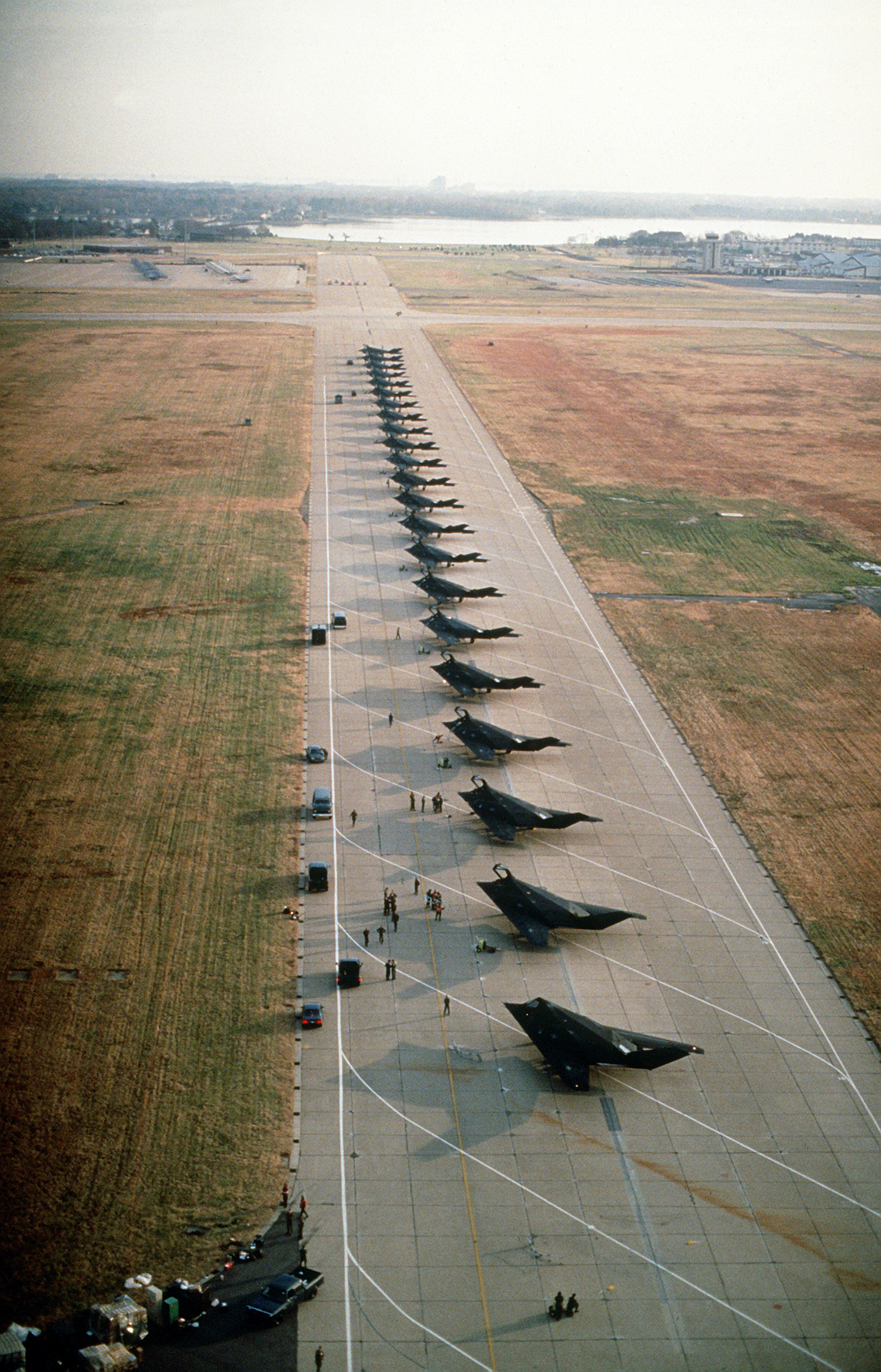
These 22 F-117s from the 37th Tactical Fighter Wing are at Langley AFB, Virginia, prior to being deployed to Saudi Arabia for Operation Desert Shield

United States

- United States Air Force
  - 4450th Tactical Group – Tonopah Test Range, Nevada
    - 4450th Tactical Squadron (1981–1989)
    - 4451st Tactical Squadron (1981–1989)
    - 4453rd Test and Evaluation Squadron (1985–1989)
  - 37th Tactical Fighter Wing/Fighter Wing – Tonopah Test Range
    - 415th Tactical Fighter Squadron (1989–1992)
    - 416th Tactical Fighter Squadron (1989–1992)
    - 417th Tactical Fighter Training Squadron (1989–1992)
  - 49th Fighter Wing – Holloman AFB, New Mexico
    - 7th Fighter Squadron (1992–2006)
    - 8th Fighter Squadron (1992–2008)
    - 9th Fighter Squadron (1993–2008)
  - 412th Test Wing – Edwards AFB, California
    - 410th Flight Test Squadron (1993–2008)

Source: f117sfa.org

== Aircraft on display ==
=== United States ===
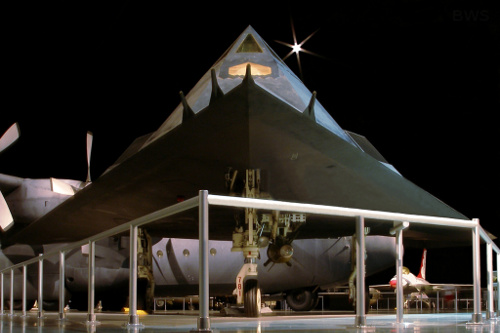
79-10781 Scorpion 2 at the National Museum of the United States Air Force

YF-117A

- 79-10780 Scorpion 1 – is on pedestal display on Nellis Boulevard, at the entrance to Nellis Air Force Base, Nevada (36°13′38.00″N 115°3′33.28″W). It was put in place on 16 May 1992, the first F-117 to be made a gate guardian.
- 79-10781 Scorpion 2 – is at National Museum of the United States Air Force at Wright-Patterson Air Force Base outside Dayton, Ohio. It was delivered to the museum on 17 July 1991.
- 79-10782 Scorpion 3 – at Holloman Air Force Base, New Mexico, was repainted to resemble the first F-117A used to drop weapons in combat. This aircraft was used for acoustics and navigation-system testing. While wearing a flag painted on its bottom surface, this aircraft revealed the type's existence to high-ranking officials at Groom Lake on 14 December 1983, the first semipublic unveiling of the aircraft. It was placed on display at Holloman AFB on 5 April 2008.
- 79-10783 Scorpion 4 – had been previously on display at the Blackbird Airpark Museum at Air Force Plant 42, Palmdale, California. In June 2012, Scorpion 4 was transported from Blackbird Airpark to Edwards AFB for restoration work; the aircraft was planned to be displayed at the Air Force Flight Test Museum.

F-117A

- 80-0785 – Pole-mounted outside the Skunk Works facility at United States Air Force Plant 42 in Palmdale, California, it is a hybrid airframe comprising the wreckage of 80–0785, the first production F-117A, and static test articles 778 and 779. It is fixed to a pedestal and serves as a monument.
- 81-0794 Delta Dawn - this aircraft arrived at the Museum of Aviation (Warner Robins) on 18 May 2023; it is to be partially restored and put on display.
- 82-0799 Midnight Rider – this aircraft arrived at the Hill Aerospace Museum on 5 August 2020; it was to be prepared and painted for display.
- 82-0803 Unexpected Guest – is displayed outside the Ronald Reagan Presidential Library in Simi Valley, California. It was fixed to a pedestal and became a monument.
- 84-0810 Dark Angel – on 13 November 2022, social media reported that the airframe was being delivered from Tonopah Test Range to the Pima Air & Space Museum. Aircraft is visible outside of the restoration and maintenance hangar as of November 2024.
- 85-0813 The Toxic Avenger – was delivered to the Castle Air Museum in Atwater, California, on 29 July 2022 for restoration and then display. Restoration was expected to take about a year and cost around $75,000.
- 85-0816 Lone Wolf - at the Evergreen Aviation & Space Museum in McMinnville, Oregon, is undergoing restoration. It was the first F-117 to drop a bomb during Operation Desert Storm.
- 85-0817 Shaba – arrived at the Kalamazoo Air Zoo on 11 December 2020. Restoration was completed and it was put on display in July 2022.
- 85-0818 The Overachiever – due to be transferred to the Smithsonian Institution and placed on display at the Steven F. Udvar-Hazy Center in Chantilly, Virginia by October 2026. This particular F-117 flew in all four major conflicts in which Nighthawks flew combat operations.
- 85-0819 Raven Beauty – arrived at the Stafford Air & Space Museum on July 11, 2024, for preservation. It was to be available for public display on 24 July 2024.
- 84-0827 – a stripped fuselage listed as "scrap" on a government-surplus website in early 2020, its fate unknown.
- 85-0831 – is located at the Strategic Air Command & Aerospace Museum in Ashland, Nebraska, where it has undergone restoration and is now on display. It served as a test aircraft at Air Force Plant 42 in Palmdale, California from 1987 to 2008.
- 85-0833 Black Devil – was unveiled at Palm Springs Air Museum on 3 October 2020, and is now on display following a period of restoration.

=== Serbia ===
F-117A

- 82-0806 Something Wicked – was shot down over Serbia; the remains are displayed at the Museum of Aviation in Belgrade close to Belgrade Nikola Tesla Airport.

== Nicknames ==
The aircraft's official name is "Night Hawk", with the alternative form "Nighthawk" also used.

As it prioritized stealth over aerodynamics, it earned the nickname "Wobblin' Goblin" due to its alleged instability at low speeds. However, F-117 pilots have stated the nickname is undeserved. "Wobblin' (or Wobbly) Goblin" is likely a holdover from the early Have Blue / Senior Trend (FSD) days of the project when instability was a problem. In the USAF, "Goblin" (without wobbly) persists as a nickname because of the aircraft's appearance. During Operation Desert Storm, Saudis dubbed the aircraft "Shaba", which is Arabic for "ghost". Some pilots also called the airplane the "Stinkbug".

During the NATO bombing of Yugoslavia in 1999, it picked up the nickname "Invisible" (Serbian Cyrillic "Невидљиви", Latin "Nevidljivi"). The name became ironic after it was shot down over Serbian airspace near Buđanovci, leading to the phrase "we didn't know it was invisible".

== Specifications (F-117A) ==
Data from U.S. Air Force National Museum, for the F-117A, Jet Bombers

General characteristics

- Crew: 1
- Length: 65 ft 11 in (20.09 m)
- Wingspan: 43 ft 4 in (13.21 m)
- Height: 12 ft 5 in (3.78 m)
- Wing area: 780 sq ft (72 m^{2})
- Airfoil: Lozenge section, three flats Upper, two flats Lower
- Empty weight: 29,500 lb (13,381 kg)
- Max takeoff weight: 52,500 lb (23,814 kg)
- Powerplant: 2 × General Electric F404-F1D2 turbofan engines, 9,040 lbf (40.2 kN) thrust each

Performance

- Maximum speed: 594 kn (684 mph, 1,100 km/h)
- Maximum speed: Mach 0.92
- Range: 930 nmi (1,070 mi, 1,720 km)
- Service ceiling: 45,000 ft (14,000 m)
- Wing loading: 67.3 lb/sq ft (329 kg/m^{2}) calculated from
- Thrust/weight: 0.40

Armament

- 2 × internal weapons bays with one hardpoint each (total of two weapons) equipped to carry:
  - Bombs:
    - GBU-10 Paveway II laser-guided bomb with 2,000 lb (910 kg) Mk84 blast/fragmentation or BLU-109 or BLU-116 Penetrator warhead
    - GBU-12 Paveway II laser-guided bomb with 500 lb (230 kg) Mk82 blast/fragmentation warhead
    - GBU-27 Paveway III laser-guided bomb with 2,000 lb (910 kg) Mk84 blast-fragmentation or BLU-109 or BLU-116 Penetrator warhead
    - GBU-31 JDAM INS/GPS guided munition with 2,000 lb (910 kg) Mk84 blast-frag or BLU-109 Penetrator warhead
    - B61 nuclear bomb

== Notable appearances in media ==
The Omaha Nighthawks professional American football team used the F-117 Nighthawk as its logo.

== See also ==
- Sea Shadow
- Wainfan Facetmobile

Related development

- Lockheed Have Blue

Aircraft of comparable role, configuration, and era

- BAE Systems Replica
- MBB Lampyridae

Related lists

- List of Lockheed aircraft
- List of military aircraft of the United States
