= Mark 80 bomb series =

American family of munitions

The Mark 80 series of bombs are a family of munitions created and primarily operated by the United States of America as general purpose unguided weapons. The Mark 80 series range from the 250 pound Mark 81 to the 2000 pound Mark 84, along with the intermediate 500 pound Mark 82, and 1000 pound Mark 83 bombs. Note however, that the "weight" of the bomb refers to the overall assembly, and the mass of explosive filler is often far less than the overall mass of the weapon.

All weapons of the Mark 80 series were designed to maximize interoperability and modularity, such that they can be dropped by many types of aircraft from service branches of various nations, and are able to be used with many different types of additional guidance kits added, most notably the Paveway series of laser guidance kits, and the JDAM series of GPS/INS guidance kits.

The bomb bodies of the Mark 80 series have 3 attachment points: the standard attachment points along the "spine" of the weapon for carrying, and a set of nose & tail attachment points for seeker heads & fin kits, respectively. For example, the nose point usually includes a fuse, the Paveway Laser Guidance kits attach to both the nose and tail, the JDAM GPS Guidance kits attach only to the tail, and the -ER wing kits clamp around the center of the bomb body, using none of the attachment points. The Mark 81-83 bombs series utilize the standard 14 inch mounting lugs, whereas the significantly larger and heavier Mark 84 uses the 30 inch mounting lugs.

Weapon	Weight	Mass of explosive filler	With Paveway Laser Guidance	With JDAM GPS Guidance
Mark 81	250 lb	96 lb	GBU-58 Paveway II EGBU-59 Enhanced Paveway II	GBU-29 JDAM (cancelled)
Mark 82	500 lb	196 lb	GBU-12 Paveway II GBU-22 Paveway III	GBU-38 JDAM GBU-54 LJDAM GBU-62 JDAM-ER GBU-75 JDAM-LR
Mark 83	1000 lbs	445 lbs	GBU-16 Paveway II EGBU-48 Enhanced Paveway II	GBU-32 JDAM GBU-55 LJDAM GBU-63 JDAM-ER
Mark 84	2000 lbs	946 lbs	GBU-10 Paveway II GBU-24 Paveway III	GBU-31 JDAM GBU-56 LJDAM GBU-64 JDAM-ER
