= Mark 84 bomb =

2000 lb unguided aerial bomb

Mark 84
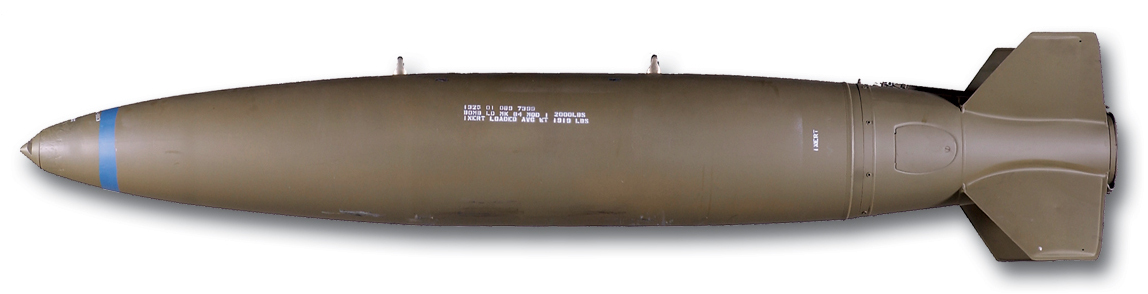
- Type: Low-drag general-purpose bomb
- Place of origin: United States

Service history
- In service: Since 1950s
- Used by: United States; Israel; Saudi Arabia

Production history
- Manufacturer: Paligen Technologies, Inc.
- Unit cost: US$16,000
- Variants: AGM-130; GBU-10 Paveway II; GBU-15; GBU-24 Paveway III; GBU‐31 JDAM

Specifications
- Mass: 2,039 lb (925 kg)
- Length: 12 ft 7 in (3.84 m)
- Diameter: 18 in (460 mm)
- Tailspan: 2 ft 1 in (640 mm)
- Warhead: Tritonal, H6 or PBXN-109
- Warhead weight: 946 lb (429 kg)
- References: Janes and The War Zone

The Mark 84 or BLU-117 is a 2,000-pound (900 kg) American general purpose aircraft bomb. It is the largest of the Mark 80 series of weapons. Entering service during the Vietnam War, it became a commonly used US heavy unguided bomb. At the time, it was the third largest bomb by weight in the US inventory behind the 15,000-pound (6,800 kg) BLU-82 "Daisy Cutter" and the 3,000-pound (1,400 kg) M118 "demolition" bomb. It is currently sixth in size due to the addition of the 5,000 lb (2,300 kg) GBU-28 in 1991, the 22,600 lb (10,300 kg) GBU-43/B Massive Ordnance Air Blast bomb (MOAB) in 2003, the 30,000 lb (14,000 kg) GBU-57A/B Massive Ordnance Penetrator (MOP) in 2011, and the 5,000 lb GBU-72 A5K Advance Penetrator in 2021, with the BLU-82 being retired in 2008 in favor of the GBU-43/B.

== Development and use ==
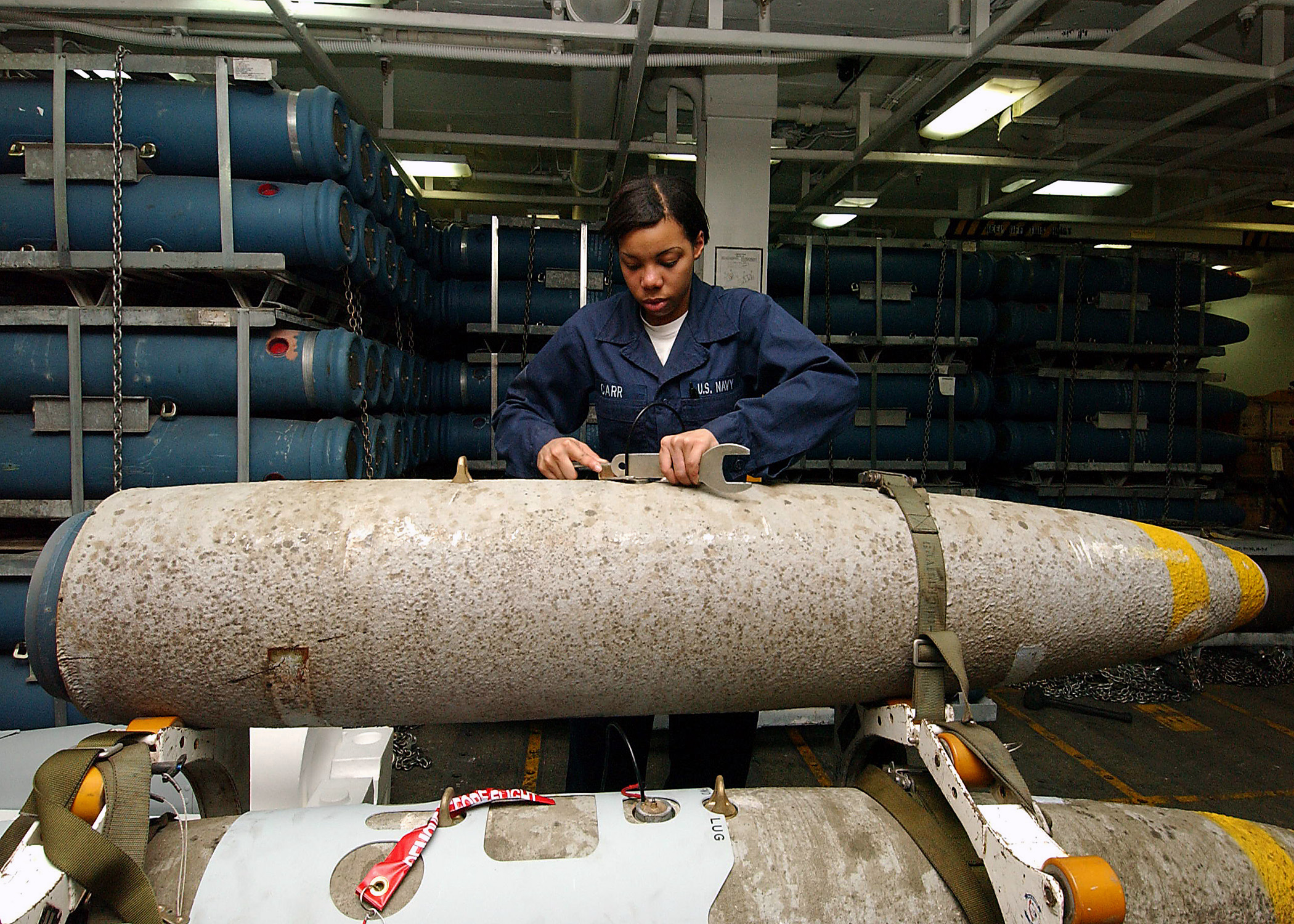
An aviation ordnance technician handling the bomb body of a "thermally protected" (insulated to slow cook-off time in case of fire) Mark 84 aboard the USS George Washington

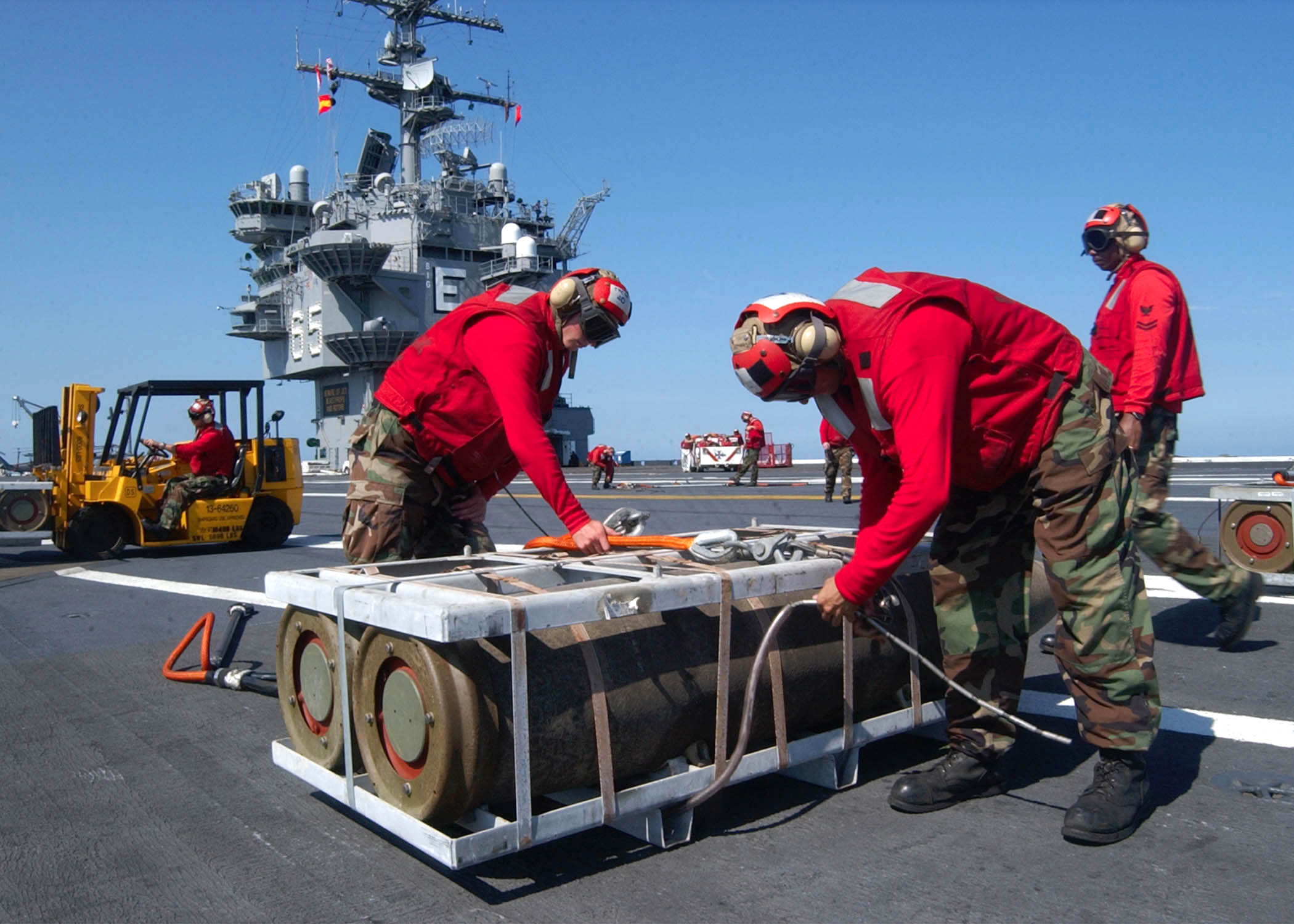
Sailors remove hoisting sling from a crate containing a pair of Mark 84 bomb bodies. Tailfins and fuzes have not yet been fitted

The Mark 84 has a nominal weight of 2,000 lb (907 kg), but its actual weight varies depending on its fin, fuze options, and retardation configuration, from 1,972 to 2,083 lb (894 to 945 kg). It is a streamlined steel casing filled with 945 lb (429 kg) of tritonal high explosive.

The Mark 84 can form a crater 50 feet (15 m) wide and 36 ft (11 m) deep. It can penetrate up to 15 inches (38 cm) of metal or 11 ft (3.4 m) of concrete, depending on the height from which it is dropped, and causes lethal fragmentation to a radius of 400 feet (120 m).

In 2003, General Dynamics acquired Intercontinental Manufacturing Company (IMCO), the manufacturer of U.S. aircraft bomb bodies located in Garland, Texas. Intercontinental Manufacturing Company became part of General Dynamics Ordnance and Tactical Systems. In 2025, Repkon USA acquired the Garland, Texas facility from General Dynamics Ordnance and Tactical Systems. In 2026, Repkon USA was renamed Paligen Technologies.

Many Mark 84s have been retrofitted with stabilizing and retarding devices to provide precision guidance capabilities. They serve as the warhead of a variety of precision-guided munitions, including the GBU-10/GBU-24/GBU-27 Paveway laser-guided bombs, GBU-15 electro-optical bomb, GBU-31 JDAM and Quickstrike sea mines. The HGK is a Turkish guidance kit used to convert 2000-lb Mark 84 bombs into GPS/INS guided smart bombs.

According to a test report conducted by the United States Navy's Weapon System Explosives Safety Review Board (WSESRB) established in the wake of the 1967 USS Forrestal fire, the cooking off time for a Mk 84 is about 8 minutes 40 seconds.

=== Deployment in wars ===
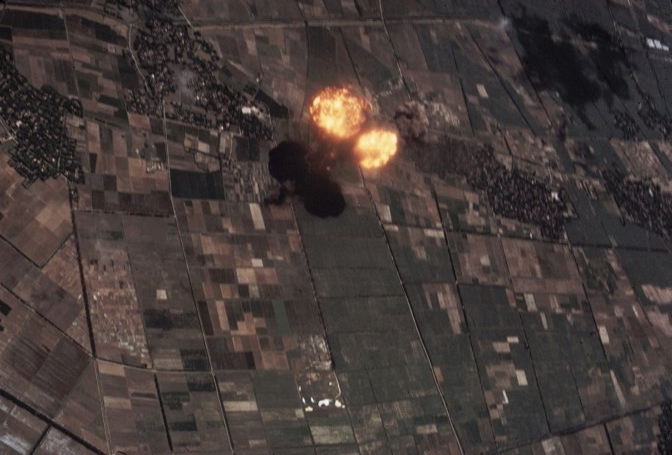
MK 84 exploding in North Vietnam, 1972

MK 84 were used by U.S. forces in the Vietnam War, Gulf War, Iraq War, Afghanistan War, the bombing of Yugoslavia, and in the 2026 Iran War and by Israel in the 2014 Gaza War and the ongoing Gaza war.

According to a forensic investigation by Human Rights Watch, MK 84 bombs were also in the Saudi-led intervention in the Yemeni civil war.

In 2023 and 2024, the United States supplied over 14,000 Mark 84 bombs to Israel. They have been used extensively in the Gaza Strip during the Gaza war. At least one of the bombs was used in the 13 July 2024 al-Mawasi attack that killed the top commander of Hamas' military wing, Mohammed Deif, and Hamas' Khan Yunis Military Division Chief Rafa Salama and 90+ Palestinians and injured over 300.

According to the US Senator Mark Kelly, Israel used a bomb of this type in the assassination of Hassan Nasrallah, leader of Hezbollah, in Lebanon on September 27, 2024.

== See also ==
- BLU-109 bomb
- BLU-116
- Mark 81 bomb
- Mark 82 bomb
- Mark 83 bomb
