= GBU-27 Paveway III =

- GBU-27 Paveway III
- Type: Laser guided bomb
- Place of origin: United States

Service history
- In service: 1987–present

Production history
- Designer: Texas Instruments
- Manufacturer: Raytheon
- Unit cost: US $ 55,600

Specifications
- Mass: 900 kg (2,000 lb)
- Length: 4.2 m (14 ft)
- Diameter: 711 mm (28.0 in)
- Effective firing range: 19 km (12 mi)

The GBU-27 Paveway III (Guided Bomb Unit) is a laser-guided bomb with bunker buster capabilities. It is a GBU-24 Paveway III fitted on the warhead of the BLU-109 bomb body that has been redesigned to be used by the F-117A Nighthawk stealth ground attack aircraft. The pilots flying over Iraq during the First Gulf War nicknamed it the "Hammer", for its considerable destructive power and blast radius.

== Combat history ==
The GBU-27 was used in Operation Desert Storm. It was the weapon used in the February 13, 1991 attack on the Amiriyah shelter, which resulted in the deaths of more than 400 Iraqi civilians. It was also used in a series of strikes on the Muthanna State Enterprise site during February 1991.

During the 1999 NATO bombing of Yugoslavia, two of these bombs were used to destroy the Avala Tower, a landmark telecommunications and observation tower near Belgrade; the structure was later rebuilt.

During the 2003 invasion of Iraq, the US Air Force dropped 98 EGBU-27s on Iraqi targets.

The first foreign sale of the GBU-27 was the acquisition by Israel of 500 units equipped with BLU-109 penetrating warheads, authorized in September 2004. Delivery of such precision guided weaponry was accelerated at the request of Israel in July 2006, though the exact munitions were not specified. Israel Defense Forces officials state that other precision-guided munitions have been used to attack Hezbollah facilities in the 2006 Lebanon War. However, the bunker busting technology in the GBU-27 could be directed, according to Israeli military sources, at Iran or possibly Syria.

As of 2011, the UK's RAF have also ordered the GBU-27 for use in Libya.

== See also ==
- Paveway
- JDAM
- BLU-109
