= Amiriyah shelter bombing =

Gulf War bombing of a civilian shelter in Iraq

- Part of the Gulf War
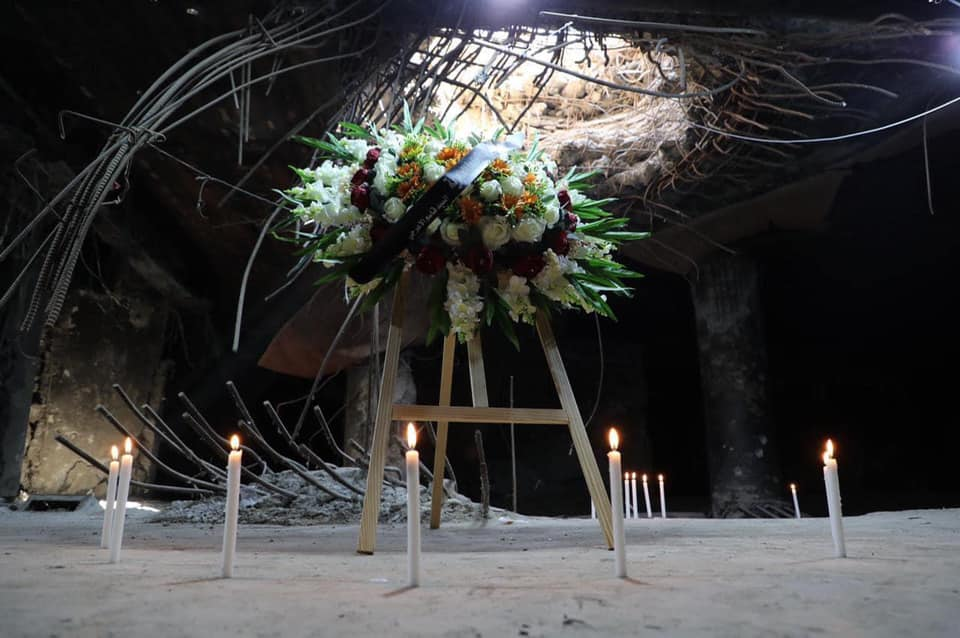
- A memorial placed near the bomb's entry hole to commemorate the 30th anniversary of the bombing (2021)

- Location of the shelter within Iraq
- Location: 33°17′50″N 44°16′51″E; Amiriya, Baghdad, Iraq
- Date: February 13, 1991 c. 4:30 a.m. (UTC+3)
- Target: Public Shelter No. 25
- Attack type: Airstrike
- Weapon: 2 GBU-27 Paveway III bombs
- Deaths: 408+ civilians
- Injuries: Unknown
- Perpetrators: United States Armed Forces; United States Air Force

An aerial bombing attack killed at least 408 civilians on 13 February 1991 during the Gulf War, when an air-raid shelter ("Public Shelter No. 25") in the Amiriyah neighborhood of Baghdad, Iraq, was destroyed by the U.S. Air Force with two GBU-27 Paveway III laser-guided bombs. Human Rights Watch characterised the bombing as a war crime.

The U.S. Department of Defense stated that it knew the facility had been used as a civil-defense shelter during the Iran–Iraq War, while the U.S. military maintained it had been converted into a command center or a military personnel bunker.

== Background ==
The Amiriyah shelter was used in the Iran–Iraq War and the Gulf War by hundreds of civilians. According to the U.S. military, the shelter at Amiriyah had been targeted because it fit the profile of a military command center; electronic signals from the locality had been reported as coming from the site, and spy satellites had observed people and vehicles moving in, and out of the shelter.

Charles E. Allen, the CIA's National Intelligence Officer for Warning, supported the selection of bomb targets during the Gulf War. He coordinated intelligence with Colonel John Warden, who headed the U.S. Air Force's planning cell known as "Checkmate". On 10 February 1991, Allen presented his estimate to Colonel Warden that Public Shelter Number 25 in the southwestern Baghdad suburb of Amiriyah had become an alternative command post and showed no sign of being used as a civilian bomb shelter. However, Human Rights Watch noted in 1991, "It is now well established, through interviews with neighborhood residents, that the Amiriyah structure was plainly marked as a public shelter and was used throughout the air war by large numbers of civilians".

A former United States Air Force general who worked as "the senior targeting officer for the Royal Saudi Air Force", an "impeccable source" according to Robert Fisk, asserted in the aftermath of the bombing that "[Richard I.] Neal talked about camouflage on the roof of the bunker. But I am not of the belief that any of the bunkers around Baghdad have camouflage on them. There is said to have been barbed wire there but that's normal in Baghdad... There's not a single soul in the American military who believes that this was a command-and-control bunker... We thought it was a military personnel bunker. Any military bunker is assumed to have some civilians in it. We have attacked bunkers where we assume there are women and children who are members of the families of military personnel who are allowed in the military bunkers".

Satellite photos and electronic intercepts indicating this alternative use as a command-and-control center were regarded as circumstantial and unconvincing to Brigadier General Buster Glosson, who had primary responsibility for targeting. Glosson commented that the assessment was not "worth a shit". However, the unnamed human source in Iraq warned the Central Intelligence Agency (CIA) that the Iraqi Intelligence Service had begun operating in the shelter. In addition, military vehicles were seen parked near the shelter. The US military stated that it did not know that many Iraqi officers had brought wives and children to shelter in the bunker, despite surveillance of the bunker by satellites and reconnaissance aircraft. According to residents, civilians had been going in and out of the shelter for "weeks"; an Al Jazeera English journalist argues this should have given the military "ample time" to detect the presence of civilians.

On 11 February, Shelter Number 25 was added to the USAF's attack plan.

== Bombing ==
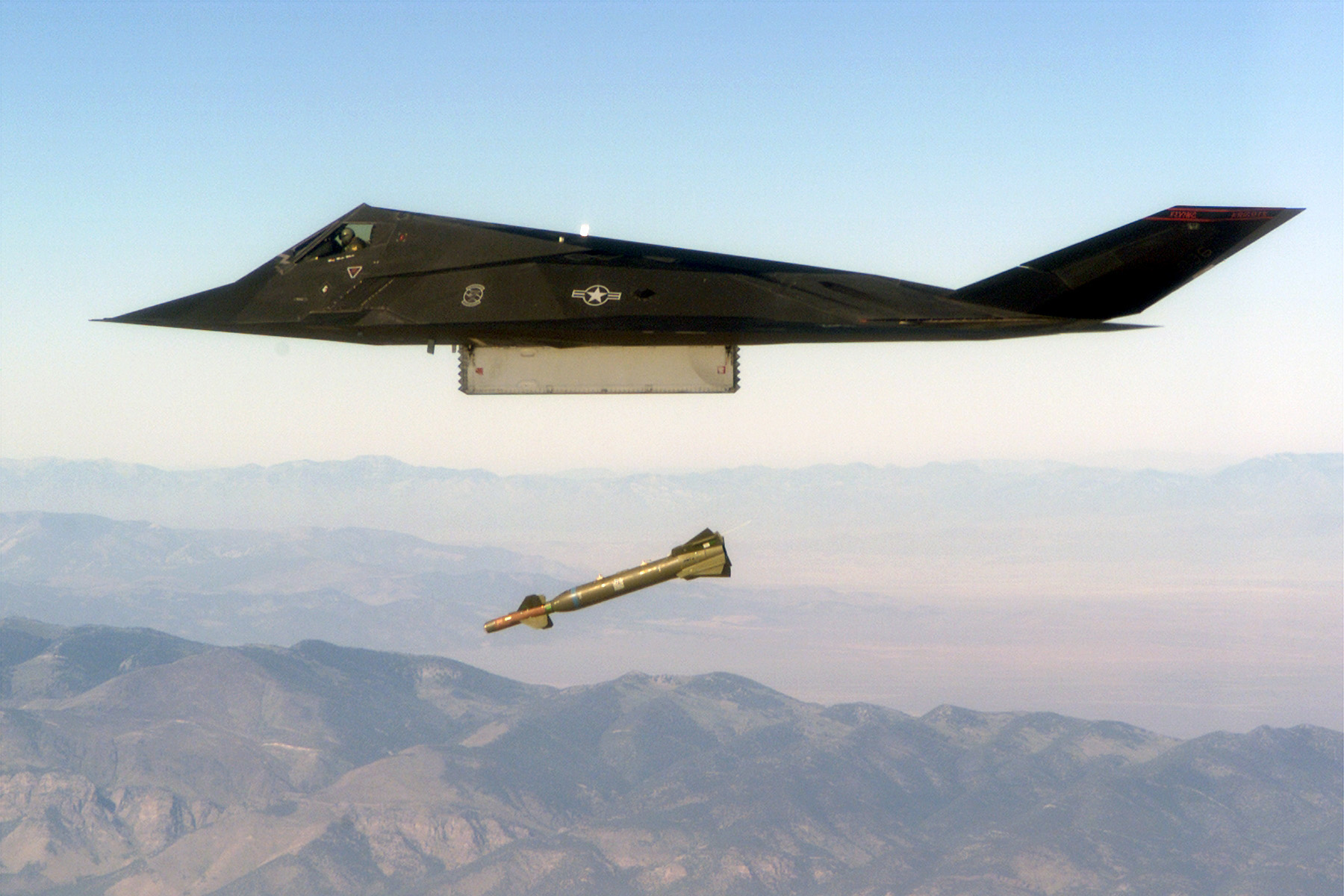
Two F-117 Nighthawk's each dropped a GBU-27 Paveway III onto the shelter

At 04:30 on the morning of 13 February, two F-117 stealth bombers each dropped a 900-kilogram (2,000 lb) GBU-27 laser-guided bomb on the shelter. The first bomb cut through 3 metres (10 ft) of reinforced concrete before a time-delayed fuse exploded. Minutes later, the second bomb followed the path cut by the first bomb. Neighborhood residents heard screams as people tried to get out of the shelter. They screamed for four minutes. After the second bomb hit, the screaming ceased.

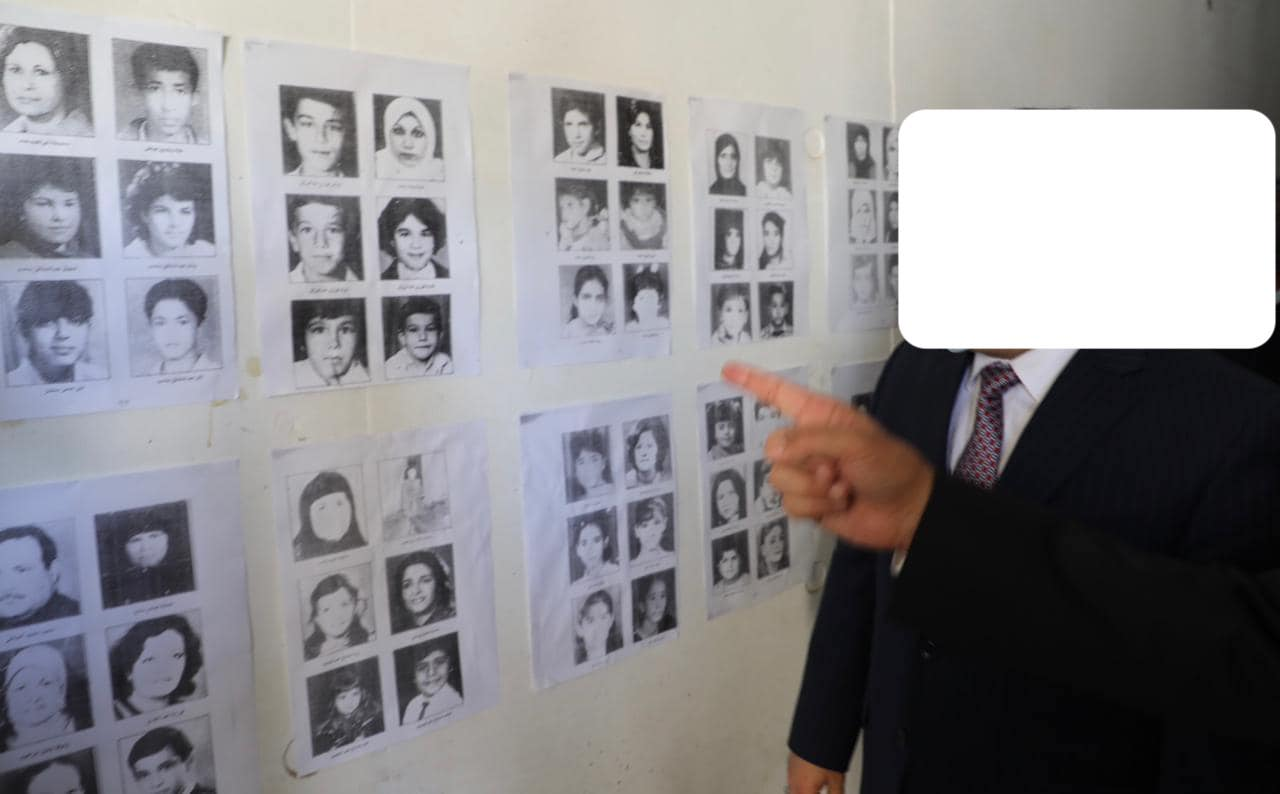
Photographs of young victims of the bombing

At the time of the bombing, hundreds of Iraqi civilians, mostly women and children, were sheltering in the building; many were sleeping. More than 408 people were killed; reports on precise numbers vary, and the registration book was incinerated in the blast. People staying on the upper level were incinerated by heat while boiling water from the shelter's water tank was responsible for the rest of the fatalities. Not all killed died immediately; black, incinerated handprints of some victims remained fused to the concrete ceiling of the shelter. Journalist John Simpson reported on the horrific sight of "bodies fused together so that they formed entire blocks of flesh" along with "a layer of melted human fat an inch deep lying on the surface of the water pumped in by the firemen". The blast sent shrapnel into surrounding buildings, shattering glass windows and splintering their foundations.

== Reactions ==
Iraqi foreign minister Tariq Aziz said: "This was a criminal, pre-meditated, planned attack against civilians."

Many foreign governments responded to the bombing at Amiriyah with mourning, outrage, and calls for investigations. Jordan declared three days of mourning. Algerian and Sudanese governing parties condemned the bombing as a "paroxysm of terror and barbarism" and a "hideous, bloody massacre" respectively. Jordan and Spain called for an international inquiry into the bombing, and Spain urged the U.S. to move its attacks away from Iraq itself and concentrate instead on occupied Kuwait.

== War crime debate ==
Jeremy Bowen, a BBC correspondent, was one of the first reporters on the scene. Bowen was given access to the site and found no evidence of military use.

The White House, in a report titled Apparatus of Lies: Crafting Tragedy, states that U.S. intelligence sources reported the shelter was being used for military command purposes. The report goes on to accuse the Iraqi government of deliberately keeping "select civilians" as human shields in a military facility at Amiriyah. USAF Major Ariane L. DeSaussur also accuses Iraq of intentionally co-mingling civilians with military personnel.

This argument has been disputed by other US military personnel. Richard G. Davis of the USAF said this explanation was not convincing. Instead he suggests that civilians were sheltering in this bunker because it was one of the last places in Baghdad with electricity. Laneka West of the US Army concurs and argues this may have been a consequence of the US destroying Baghdad's electricity infrastructure early in the war. West also argues that the location of the bunker in a densely populated area was not a violation of API Article 58. It is possible to locate a bunker closer to populated areas to mask electronic signals.

According to Jane's Information Group, the signals intelligence observed at the shelter was from an aerial antenna that was connected to a communications center some 270 metres (300 yd) away.

Oxford professor Janina Dill writes that if the US indeed knew about the presence of civilians, the attack would be a war crime. The 1977 Additional Protocol I (AP1) to the 1949 Geneva Conventions, Article 57 requires the "principle of proportionality", which is that the military advantage of an attack must be balanced against potential for civilian casualties. However, USAF Major Ariane L. DeSaussur argues that during the Gulf War, neither the United States nor Iraq had ratified AP1. (Iraq later ratified it in 2010, but the US has still not ratified it). However, Human Rights Watch points out that the US in 1987 had already accepted parts of Protocol I as customary international humanitarian law, including affirming that "attacks not be carried out that would clearly result in collateral civilian casualties disproportionate to the expected military advantage."

== Memorial ==
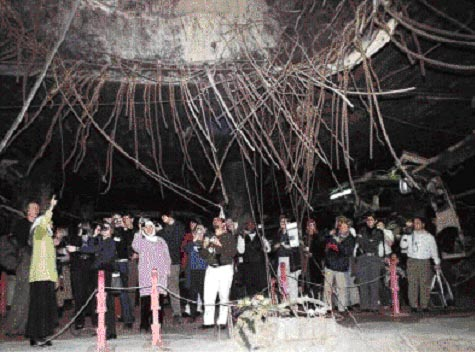
Visitors touring the shelter

The shelter is currently maintained as it was after the blast, as a memorial to those who died within it, featuring photos of those killed. According to visitors' reports, Umm Greyda, a woman who lost eight children in the bombing, moved into the shelter to help create the memorial and serves as its primary guide.

For many years, Iraqi schools commemorated "al Amiriyah shelter day", which often involved criticism of US foreign policy.

Many Iraqis later compared the Amiriyah shelter bombing to other instances when Americans were not held accountable for killing Iraqi civilians, including the Nisour Square massacre and the Haditha massacre.

== Lawsuit ==
Seven Iraqi families living in Belgium who lost relatives in the bombing launched a lawsuit against former President George H. W. Bush, former Secretary of Defense Dick Cheney, former Chairman of the Joint Chiefs of Staff Colin Powell, and General Norman Schwarzkopf for committing what they say were war crimes in the 1991 bombing. The suit was brought under Belgium's universal jurisdiction guarantees in March 2003 but was dismissed in September following their restriction to Belgian nationals and residents in August 2003.

== See also ==
- Dedebit Elementary School airstrike, Ethiopian attack on an IDP camp using laser-guided bombs
- Mariupol theatre airstrike, Russian bombing of a theatre-turned-air raid shelter
- Nisour Square massacre, a massacre of Iraqi civilians by American contractors
- 2026 Minab school attack, US military strike on an Iranian elementary school
