= AGM-130 =

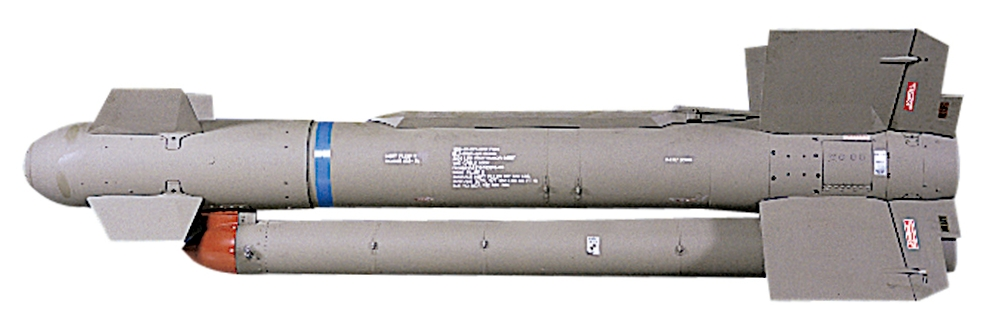
- Type: Air-to-surface guided missile
- Place of origin: United States

Service history
- In service: 1994–2013
- Used by: United States (USAF)
- Wars: Kosovo War

Production history
- Unit cost: Approximately $450,000 per weapon

Specifications
- Mass: 2,917 lb (1,323 kg)
- Length: 12 feet, 10.5 inches (3.90 meters)
- Diameter: 15 in/18 in (38 cm/46 cm) (bomb); 9 in (23 cm) (rocket motor)
- Wingspan: 59 in (150 cm)
- Warhead: 2,000 lb (907 kg) BLU-109 or MK 84
- Operational range: 46.6 miles (75 kilometers) although exact range is classified
- Flight ceiling: 30,000-plus feet (9,100 meters)
- Maximum speed: High subsonic, but exact speed is classified

The AGM-130 was an air-to-ground guided missile developed by the United States of America. Developed in 1984, it is effectively a rocket-boosted version of the GBU-15 bomb. It first entered operational service on 11 January 1999, and was retired in 2013. 502 were produced.

== Overview ==
The AGM-130 is a powered air-to-surface missile designed for strikes at long range against various targets. It is essentially a rocket-boosted version of the GBU-15 bomb, with the rocket motor increasing the launch range and so giving the launch aircraft protection from whatever defenses may protect the target. Two can be carried by the F-111F and F-15E.

In 1991 the development of some significant upgrades began; these included a new CCD seeker and a GPS/INS (GPS-aided Inertial Navigation System) mid-course guidance. This combined enhancement provided the system with an adverse weather capability. It can be retargeted in flight; the guidance head of the weapon provides a visual image of the target to the launch aircraft via the AXQ-14 data link, allowing the controller to steer it to the target (command guidance). The weapon can be retargeted in flight by simply steering it to a new target. Control can be released at any point, allowing the missile to home in on the target by itself. The AGM-130 is highly accurate, and is intended for use against high-value targets which are either slow moving or of fixed location.

The GBU-15 is a modular weapon, and the AGM-130 continues this concept. It consists of a CCD TV or focal plane array imaging infrared seeker head, a radar altimeter, wings, strakes, a Mark 84 or BLU-109 warhead, a control section, and a rocket motor and data link unit.

The AGM-130 needs little support on the ground, and can be based in remote "bare base" sites. What support and maintenance is required can be provided by mobile support equipment and intermediate level maintenance capability.

Development of the AGM-130A began in 1984 as an improvement to the GBU-15. The first unit became operational in 1994. Precise numbers are classified, but the US Air Force planned to buy 4,000+ originally. This was reduced to 2,300 units, and in 1995 further reduced to 502.

Development of the AGM-130 cost $192 million, not including a further $11 million for the AGM-130C.

== Variants ==
The AGM-130A was a Mk 84 general purpose bomb fitted with a television (TV) or imaging infrared seeker head, a GBU-15 short chord airfoil group, and an Alliant Techsystems SR 122-RD-1 solid-propellant boost motor. The motor is jettisoned in flight after the approximate 30-to-60 second boost phase.

The AGM-130B was a specialized variant utilizing the SUU-54/B submunition dispenser warhead, though it was ultimately cancelled before widespread production.

The upgraded AGM-130 Mid-Course Guidance (MCG) weapon, employs an improved global positioning and inertial navigation system. This allows the weapon to be used with less input from the launch aircraft, freeing the pilot and weapon systems officer for other tasks. The weapon became operational in 1999 when two F-15Es from the 335th and 336th Fighter Squadrons at Seymour Johnson Air Force Base, North Carolina, fired one weapon each.

The AGM-130LW [lightweight] is designed to be used by single-seat aircraft such as the F-16C. It also has an enhanced global positioning and inertial navigation system capability. The smaller, less powerful warhead used on this weapon allows better control over collateral damage.

The AGM-130C employed a 900 kg (2,000 lbs) BLU-109 penetrating warhead for use against hardened targets. It was developed, but not put into service.

The Autonomous AGM-130 is a proposed weapon that would incorporate a laser radar (LADAR) seeker, removing any need for the weapon to be steered to the target. The aircraft interface would be based on the JDAM interface; use of the autonomous seeker would greatly reduce the mission planning requirements and aircrew workload. Elimination of the datalink would also reduce the susceptibility to countermeasures.

== Combat history ==
The AGM-130 saw its first operational service on 11 January 1999 during Operation Northern Watch, when a pair of AGM-130s were used by F-15Es to destroy two Iraqi SAM sites. The AGM-130 was also the weapon used in the April 1999 NATO strike on a railway bridge in Grdelica, Serbia.

== Operators ==
- United States: The United States Air Force was the only operator of the AGM-130
