= GBU-24 Paveway III =

- Type: Laser-guided bomb
- Place of origin: United States of America

Service history
- In service: 1983

Production history
- Designer: Texas Instruments
- Designed: 1980
- Manufacturer: Raytheon

Specifications
- Mass: 1,050 kg (2,315 lb)
- Length: 4.39 m (14 ft 5 in)
- Diameter: 460 millimetres (18 in)
- Filling: Mark 84 bomb as warhead
- Filling weight: 910 kilograms (2,000 lb)

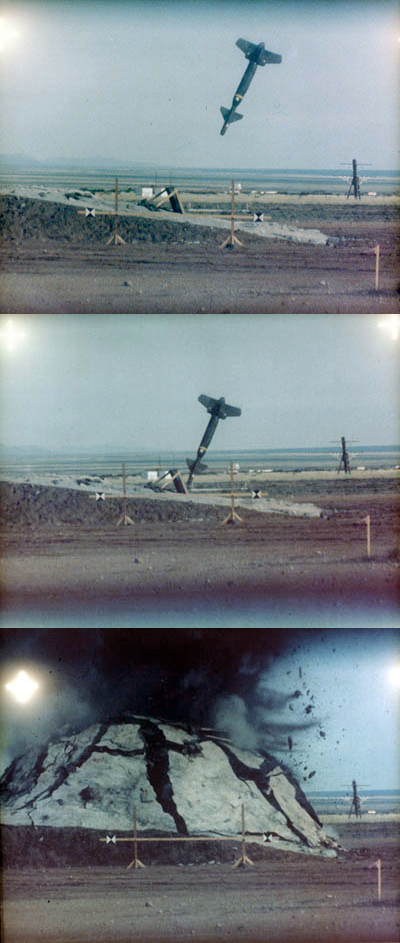
A laser-guided GBU-24 (BLU-109 warhead variant) strikes its target.

GBU-24 Paveway III or simply GBU-24 is a family of laser-guided bombs, a sub-group of the larger Raytheon Paveway III family of weapons. The Paveway guidance package consists of a seeker package attached to the nose of the weapon, and a wing kit attached to the rear to provide stability and greater range.

== Operation ==
Compared to the GBU-10 family, or the Paveway II family, the GBU-24 glides farther as a result of more efficient guidance technology. The Paveway III guidance kit is more expensive, however, making the GBU-24 suitable against well-defended, high-value targets. It was introduced into service c. 1983. This weapon is in service with the USAF, US Navy, US Marine Corps, and various NATO air forces.

The bomb requires a spot of pulse-coded laser energy to home on; this can be supplied by the delivery aircraft, another aircraft (Buddy Lasing), or by a Ground Laser Designator. After release from the delivery aircraft, the thermal battery for the Guidance Computer Group fires to supply power; the arming wire for the fuze is withdrawn; the wings are released; and depending on the configuration, either the turbine generator or the safety switch (to power the fuze) is activated.

Once this has happened, the seeker guides the bomb toward the designated impact point. If the laser illumination is lost, the bomb stops guiding and follows a roughly ballistic path, although interference from the guidance kit can lead to the weapon wandering off course. While the GBU-24 is guided, it is not a powered weapon—i.e., it has no propulsion. Its range, therefore, depends on aircraft speed, altitude, wind speed, etc. The GBU-24 is precise enough to be able to fly down ventilation shafts into hardened targets, although accuracy is usually dependent on the ability to point the laser correctly rather than the bomb's ability to hit the impact point.

The GBU-24 is cleared on the F-15E, F-16A MLU, F-16C Block 40/42, F-16C Block 50/52 CCIP, F-16C+ Block 30 SCU8, F/A-18, Panavia Tornado, Eurofighter Typhoon, Mirage 2000, Rafale, F-14 Tomcat (prior to the Tomcat's retirement from US Navy service), F-4E AUP, F-111C AUP and the Predator C UAVs.

Warhead options consist of:

- Mk. 84 – 910 kilograms (2,000 lb) General Purpose
- BLU-109 – 910 kilograms (2,000 lb) Penetrator
- BLU-116 – Advanced Unitary Penetrator
- CPE-800 – Used in the BPG-2000, a similar, indigenous Spanish weapon

== Operational use ==
Twenty-three GBU-24s were dropped by the US Navy's F-14s during the 2003 invasion of Iraq.

== On display ==
A deactivated example is on display at Eden Camp Museum.
