= BLU-109 bomb =

BLU-109
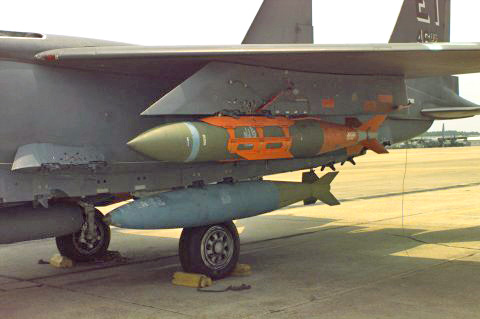
- A BLU-109 aboard an F-15E Strike Eagle configured as a JDAM
- Type: Free-fall penetration bomb (guided when equipped as JDAM or Paveway)
- Place of origin: United States

Service history
- In service: 1985-present
- Used by: United States Air Force; Israeli Air Force
- Wars: War in Afghanistan; Iraq War; Gaza war; Israel–Hezbollah conflict (2023–present); 2026 Iran war

Specifications
- Mass: 2,000 lb (910 kg)
- Length: 7 ft 11 in (2.41 m)
- Diameter: 14.6 in (370 mm)
- Filling: Tritonal
- Filling weight: 550 lb (250 kg)

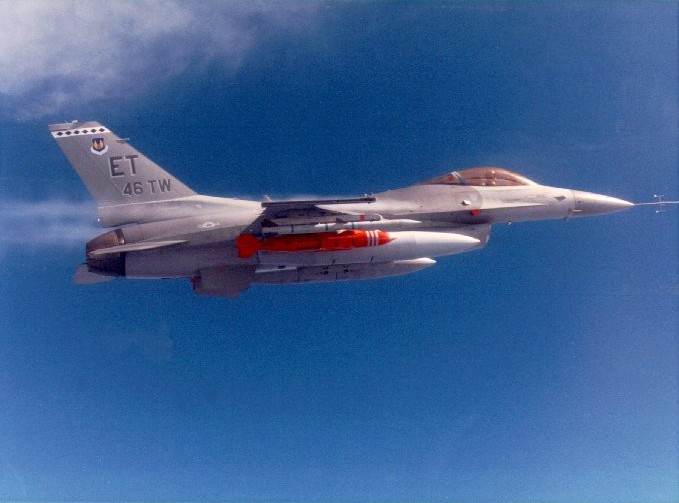
A BLU-109 aboard a General Dynamics F-16 Fighting Falcon configured as a JDAM

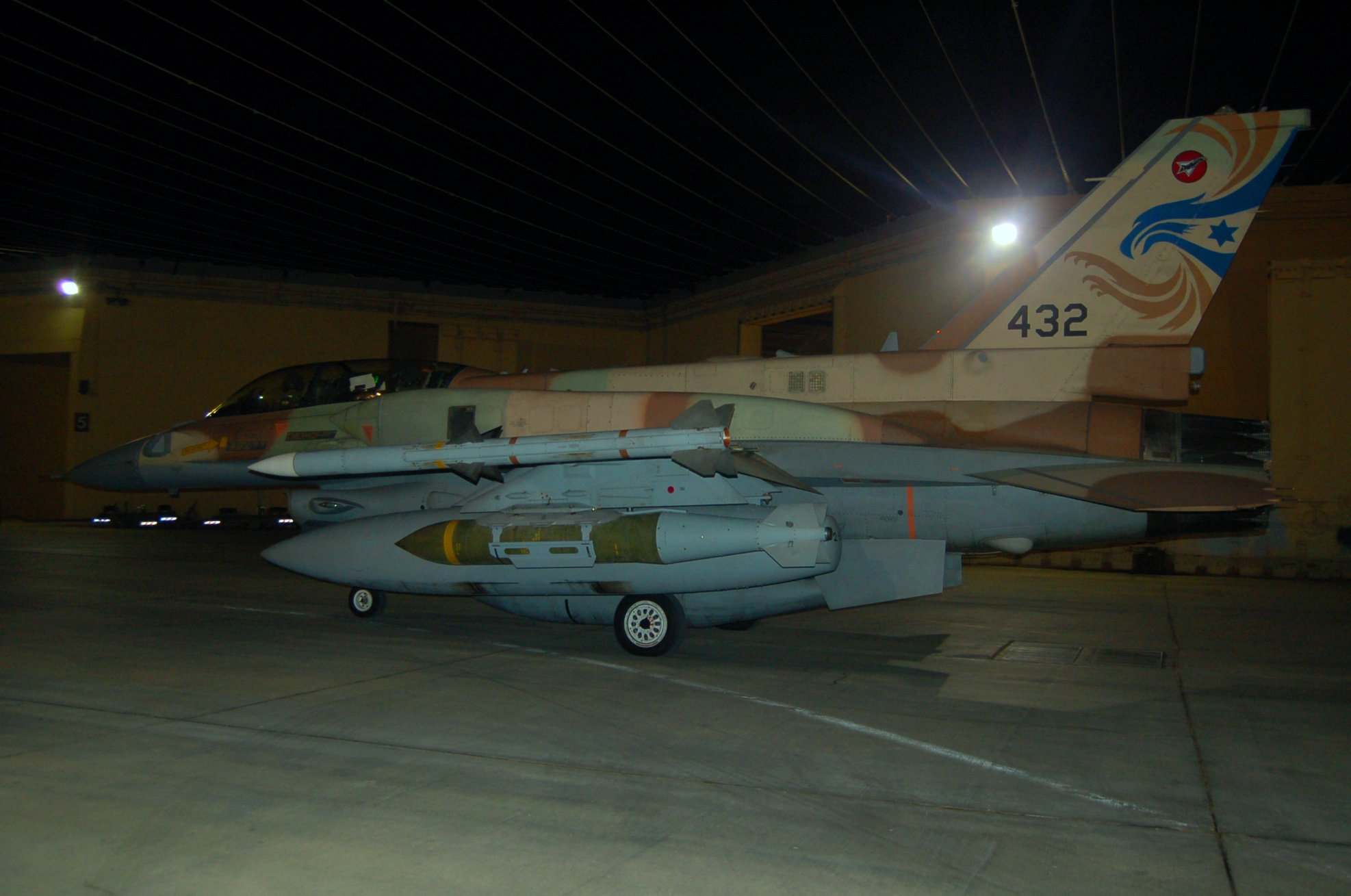
F-16I (Israeli Air Force) with a BLU-109 JDAM, 2,000 lb (910 kg) bunker buster penetration bomb

The BLU-109/B is a hardened bunker buster penetration bomb used by the United States Air Force (BLU is an acronym for Bomb Live Unit). As with other "bunker busters", it is intended to penetrate concrete shelters and other hardened structures before exploding. In addition to the US, it is part of the armament of the air forces of Australia, Belgium, Canada, Denmark, France, Germany, Greece, Italy, Israel, Netherlands, Norway, Pakistan, Saudi Arabia, United Kingdom, and United Arab Emirates.

== Design ==
The BLU-109/B has a steel casing about 1 inch (25 mm) thick. Its warhead is filled with 550 pounds (250 kg) of tritonal. It has a mechanical-electrical delayed-action FMU-143 tail-fuze.

The BLU-109 entered service in 1985. It is also used as the warhead of some marks of the GBU-15 electro-optically guided bomb, the GBU-24 Paveway III and GBU-27 Paveway III laser-guided bombs, as well as the GBU-31 Joint Direct Attack Munition (JDAM) and AGM-130 air-to-surface missile.

== Variants ==
The BLU-118 is reportedly a thermobaric explosive filler variation on the BLU-109 casing and basic bomb design. It contains PBXIH-135, an aluminized enhanced blast explosive.

In 2015, General Dynamics started a $7.2 million development of a version called HAMMER, which is intended to destroy chemical and biological substances by spreading dozens of Kinetic Fireballs Incendiaries (KFI) (not explosions) inside a bunker. The KFIs evolved out of the earlier Small Business Innovation Research (SBIR) program by Exquadrum, Inc. of Adelanto, California.

== Operators ==
The BLU-109 has been sold to key US allies including South Korea, Israel, Greece, Saudi Arabia, UAE, Pakistan, and Turkey

- Australia: Royal Australian Air Force.
- Greece: Hellenic Air Force
- Israel: Israeli Air Force
- Morocco: Royal Moroccan Air Force
- Netherlands: Royal Netherlands Air Force
- Pakistan: Pakistan Air Force
- Saudi Arabia: Royal Saudi Air Force
- Serbia: Serbian Air Force
- South Korea: Republic of Korea Air Force
- Turkey: Turkish Air Force
- UAE: United Arab Emirates Air Force
- United States: United States Air Force

== Operational history ==
In late 2023, the United States delivered 100 BLU-109 bombs to Israel. Israeli F-15I fighter jets are believed to have used BLU-109s with JDAM guidance kits in the strikes that killed Hezbollah leader Hassan Nasrallah in Beirut on 27 September 2024.

It was also reported that Israel used BLU-109s in a July 2024 attack on Al-Mawasi that killed al-Qassam Brigades chief Mohammed Deif and al-Qassam Brigades Khan Yunis head Rafa Salama.

BLU-109 bombs were used by the US in combat in the 2026 Iran war.

== See also ==
- BLU-116
