= BLU-116 =

- Type: 'Bunker buster' bomb
- Place of origin: United States

Service history
- Used by: United States Air Force

Specifications
- Mass: 874 kg (1,927 lb)
- Length: 2.4 m (7.9 ft)
- Width: .37 m (1.2 ft)

The BLU-116 is a United States Air Force bomb, designed as an enhanced bunker buster penetration weapon, designed to penetrate deep into rock or concrete and destroy hard targets.

The BLU-116 is the same shape, size, and weight (1,927 lb / 874 kg) and twice the penetration as the BLU-109 penetration bomb first deployed in the 1980s. The BLU-116 has a lightweight outer shell around a dense, heavy metal penetrator core. The shape and size mean that the BLU-116 could be used by unmodified existing aircraft and bomb guidance units such as the GPS guided GBU-31 Joint Direct Attack Munition and GBU-24 Paveway III laser-guided bomb.
