= GBU-10 Paveway II =

- Type: Unpowered guided weapon

Specifications
- Mass: 2,000 lb (910 kg)
- Length: 14 ft 4 in (4.37 m)
- Diameter: 18 in (460 mm)
- Effective firing range: More than 8 nmi (9.2 mi; 15 km)

The GBU-10 Paveway II is an American Paveway-series laser-guided bomb, based on the Mk 84 general-purpose bomb, but with laser seeking capabilities and wings for guidance. Introduced into service c. 1976, it is used today by the USAF, US Navy, US Marine Corps, Royal Australian Air Force and various NATO air forces.

== Description ==
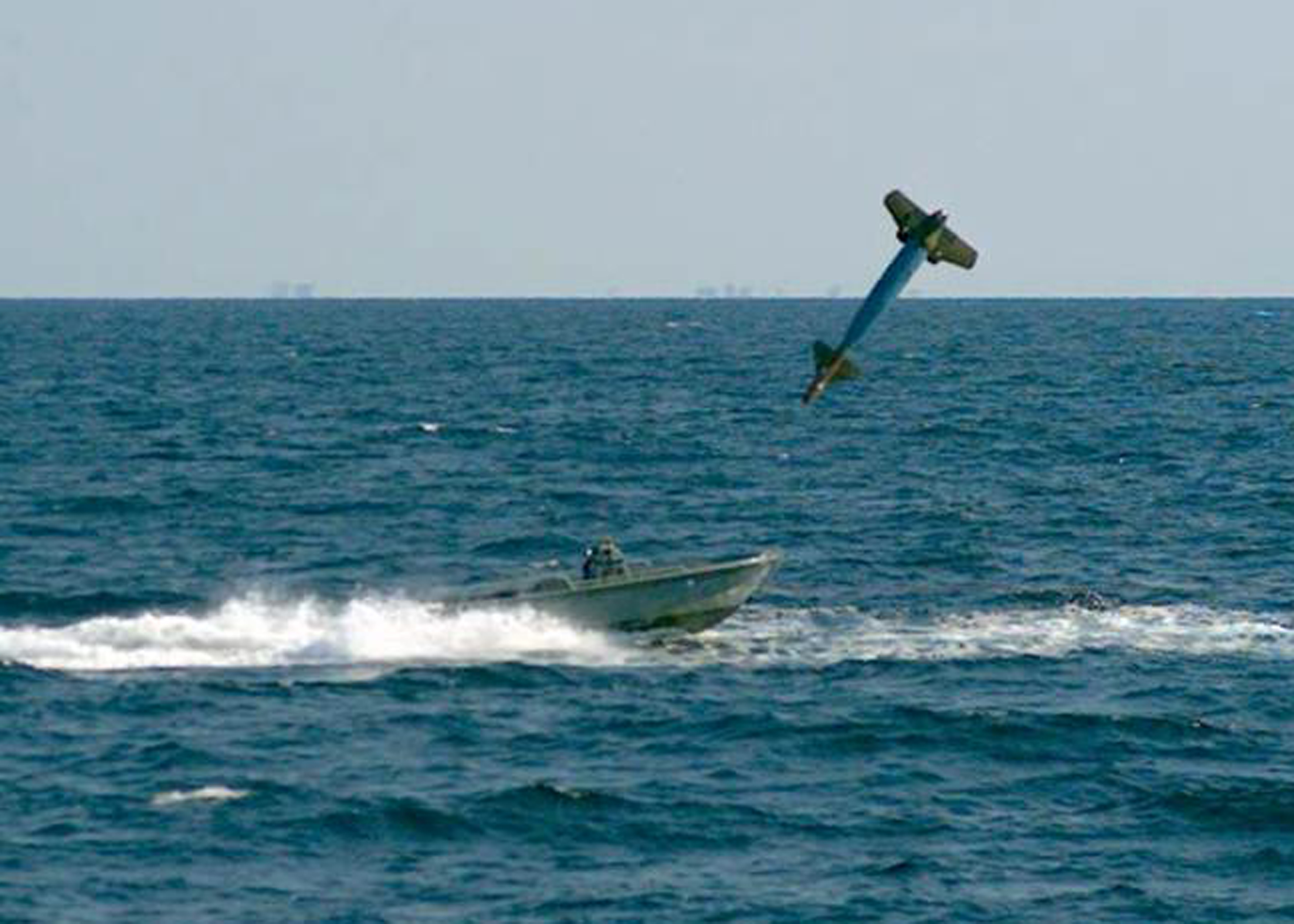
GBU-10 shortly before it impacts a small boat during a training exercise

The GBU-10 has been built in more than a half-dozen variants with different wing and fuse combinations. Weight depends on the specific configuration, ranging from 2,055 to 2,103 lb (932 to 954 kg). GBU-10 bombs (along with the balance of the Paveway series) are produced by defense contractors Lockheed Martin and Raytheon. Raytheon began production after purchasing the product line from Texas Instruments. Lockheed Martin was awarded a contract to compete with Raytheon when there was a break in production caused by transferring manufacturing out of Texas.

Raytheon production of the Paveway II is centered in Arizona, Texas, and New Mexico. Lockheed Martin production is centered in Pennsylvania.

According to Raytheon's fact sheet for the Paveway II, 99 deliveries of guided munitions will yield a circular error probable (CEP) of only 3.6 feet (1.1 m), compared to a CEP of 310 feet (94 m) for 99 unguided bombs dropped under similar conditions.

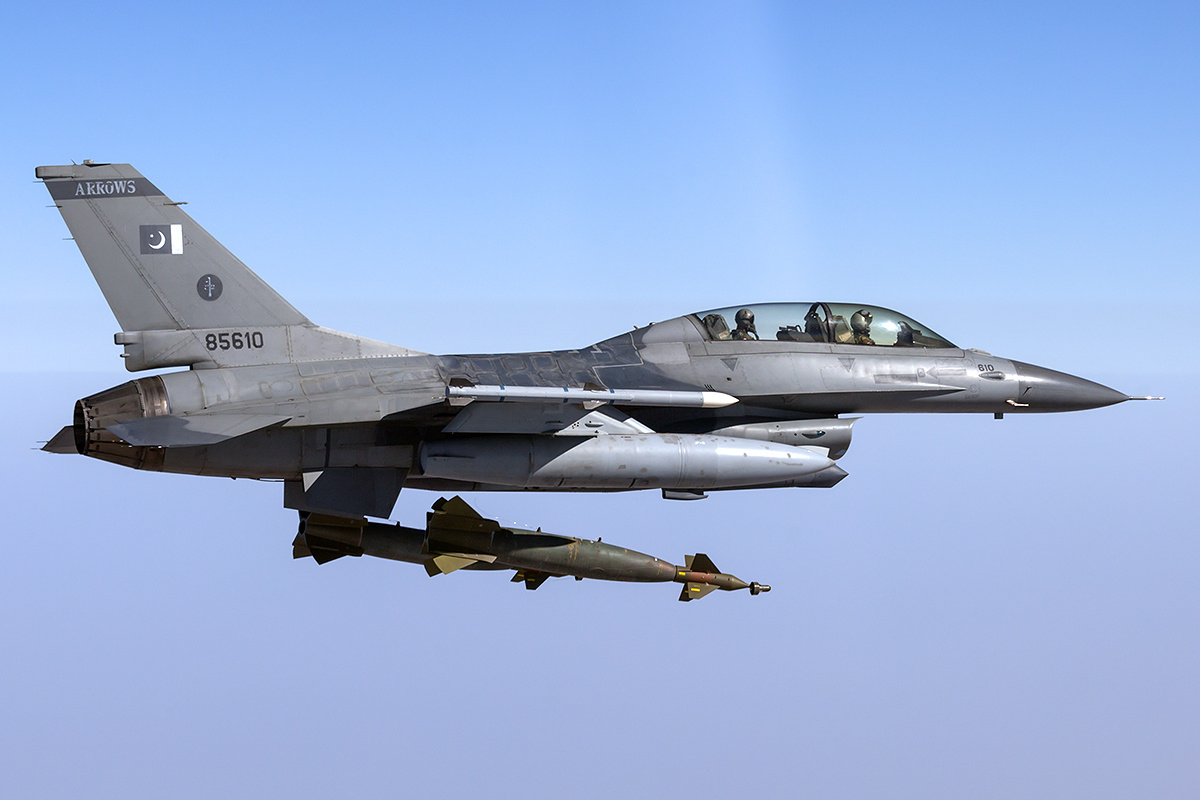
A Pakistan Air Force F-16BM drops two 2000lb GBU-10s.

On 14 February 1991, an air-to-air kill was scored by a GBU-10 when an F-15E Strike Eagle of the 335th Tactical Fighter Squadron hit an Iraqi Air Force Mil Mi-24 Hind. 30 seconds after firing, the F-15E crew thought the bomb had missed and were about to fire an AIM-9 Sidewinder air-to-air missile when the helicopter suddenly exploded.

Both Lockheed Martin and Raytheon have developed GPS-guided versions of the GBU-10. Lockheed Martin calls its version the DMLGB (Dual-Mode LGB) GPS/INS, and the U.S. Navy issued Lockheed Martin a contract in 2005 for further development of the weapon system. The GPS/INS-equipped version of the GBU-10 produced by Raytheon is the GBU-50/B, also informally also known as the EGBU-10 (GPS/INS-enabled LGBs are frequently referred to as Enhanced GBUs or EGBUs). So far, Raytheon-built Paveway II EGBUs have only been produced for export, and have been used in combat by the British Royal Air Force over Afghanistan and Iraq. The GBU-10s along with GBU-12 have been used by Pakistan Air Force to carry out counterinsurgency (COIN) operations against terrorist hideouts in Pakistan's northwestern tribal regions, especially after 2009.
