= List of U.S. Department of Defense and partner code names =

List of DoD code names

This is an incomplete list of United States Department of Defense code names primarily the two-word series variety. Officially, Arkin (2005) says that there are three types of code name:

- Nicknames – a combination of two separate unassociated and unclassified words (e.g. Polo and Step) assigned to represent a specific program, special access program, exercise, or activity.
- Code words – a single classified word (e.g. BYEMAN) which identifies a specific special access program or portion. A list of several such code words can be seen at Byeman Control System, though the Byman Control System itself has now ceased to be used.
- Exercise terms – a combination of two words, normally unclassified, used exclusively to designate an exercise or test

In 1975, the Joint Chiefs of Staff introduced the Code Word, Nickname, and Exercise Term System (NICKA) which automated the assignment of names. NICKA gives each DOD organization a series of two-letter alphabetic sequences, requiring each 'first word' or a nickname to begin with a letter pair. For example, AG through AL was assigned to United States Joint Forces Command.

The general system described above is now in use by NATO, the United Kingdom, Canada (Atlantic Guard, Atlantic Spear, Atlantic Shield) Australia and New Zealand, and allies/partners including countries like Sweden.

Most of the below listings are "Nicknames."

- A
- B
- C
- D
- E
- F
- G
- H
- I
- J
- K
- L
- M
- N
- O
- P
- Q
- R
- S
- T
- U
- V
- W
- Y

== List of code names ==
=== A ===
- Able – North Atlantic Treaty Organization (NATO) Allied Command Europe (ACE) and U.S. European Command (USEUCOM) nuclear weapons exercise first word. First gained prominence after the Able Archer 83 nuclear command and control exercise.
  - Able Ally – annual command post exercise involving escalation to nuclear use. Held November/December/
  - Able Archer 83 – nuclear command and control exercise
  - Able Crystal – nuclear weapons related exercise
  - Able Gain – annual United States Air Forces in Europe (USAFE) field training exercise involving NATO Nuclear sharing forces
  - Able Staff – command post exercise, April–September 1997, practicing Supreme Allied Commander Europe (SACEUR)'s nuclear warning system.
- Able – Coast Guard first word
  - Able Manner – Windward Passage patrols to interdict Haitian migrants, January 1993-November 1993.
  - Able Response
  - Able Vigil
- Able Avionics – Air Training Command program of 1976 to provide only elemental training for avionics systems maintenance at training centers, with further training given at field training detachments.
- Able Chief – Air Training Command program of 1976 to provide only elemental training for crew chiefs at training centers, with further training given at field training detachments.
- Able Danger – A program and compartment led by the United States Special Operations Command (SOCOM) and the Defense Intelligence Agency (DIA). It was created as a result of a directive from the Joint Chiefs of Staff in early October 1999 by Chairman of the Joint Chiefs of Staff General Hugh Shelton, to develop an information operations campaign plan against transnational terrorism.
- Able Mable – US Air Force top-secret RF-101C Voodoo reconnaissance aircraft flights over Southeast Asia confirming communist activity in South Vietnam and Laos
- Operation Able Sentry/Sabre 1993–1999 – U.S. Army task force attached to United Nations Preventive Deployment Force (UNPREDEP) in Macedonia to monitor border activity.
- Ace Guard – NATO deployment of the ACE Mobile Force (Air) and surface to air missiles to Turkey, between 3 January 1991 – 8 March 1991. Turkey had requested greater NATO forces to be deployed to meet any Iraqi threat after the Iraqi invasion of Kuwait on 2 August 1990.
- Operation Acid Gambit – Operation undertaken by U.S. Army Delta Force and the 160th Special Operations Aviation Regiment to rescue Kurt Muse, a U.S. citizen involved in the broadcast of anti-Noriega material, during the United States invasion of Panama, 1989.
- Active Edge – Routine no-notice NATO Allied Forces Central Europe readiness exercise held twice yearly. "The most recent such exercise took place, on the date and in the format planned, on 12th June 1989. It did not include the exercise deployment of forces outside their garrisons." (House of Lords Debate 27 June 1989)
- Operation Active Endeavour – NATO Allied Forces Southern Europe Mediterranean patrols
- Operation Active Fence – operations to guard NATO border during Syrian fighting
- Adventure – ACE Mobile Force first word
  - Adventure Exchange – command post exercise
  - Adventure Express – winter exercise series, dating to at least 1983.
- African – U.S.-Moroccan European Command (EUCOM) (now Africa Command) first word
  - African Eagle – U.S.-Moroccan biennial exercise practicing deployment of United States Air Force (USAF) units to Morocco. Dates to at least 1984.
  - African Falcon '85, African Fox '85.
  - Exercise African Lion – in 2009 described as "Train forces capable of conducting joint and combined U.S., air, and land combat interoperability operations." Held in Morocco with Royal Moroccan Armed Forces.
- Exercise Agile Spirit 19 began with dual opening ceremonies at Senaki Air Base and Vaziani Training Area in the country of Georgia on July 27, 2019. Approximately 3,300 military personnel from 14 allied and partner forces were expected to participate in the exercise.
- Exercise Alam Halfa – U.S.-New Zealand, NZ-sponsored land forces exercise, Linton and Napier, central North Island, April 26-May 6, 2012. The new exercise series, according to the New Zealand Herald, was made possible by the "Wellington Declaration" signed by the two countries in November 2010. Continued probably yearly after that point; Alam Halfa 2013. Named for the Battle of Alam Halfa during World War II.
- Allied – NATO Allied Command Europe first word
  - Allied Action – Combined Joint Task Force exercises, in the sense of greater European Union involvement in military affairs. See Berlin Plus agreement.
  - Allied Effort – Combined Joint Task Force exercises, in the sense of greater European Union involvement in military affairs. See Berlin Plus agreement. Allied Effort 01 had the CJTF exercising in Wrocław, Poland. Also reported as codename for NATO's maritime operation in the Adriatic Sea during the Kosovo crisis in 1999.
  - Operation Allied Force 1999 – Air war over Serbia to withdraw forces from Kosovo.
  - Operations Allied Goodwill I & II, 4–9 February & 27 February-24 March 1992. After the collapse of the Soviet Union in December 1991, NATO flew teams of humanitarian assistance experts and medical advisors to Russia and other former Soviet states using NATO Airborne Early Warning Force trainer cargo aircraft.
  - Operation Allied Harmony was launched in December 2002 to provide NATO advisory elements to assist the Macedonian government in ensuring stability.
  - Operation Allied Protector - anti-piracy operation undertaken by NATO forces from March – August 2009 in the Gulf of Aden, the Indian Ocean, and the Guardafui Channel to protect International Recommended Transit Corridor (IRTC) maritime routes from pirates. Succeeded by Ocean Shield.
  - Allied Provider - Initial NATO anti-piracy operation in Gulf of Aden and Indian Ocean. Succeeded by Allied Protector.
  - Operation Allied Solace - NATO operation in 2021 after collapse of Afghan government to receive NATO-affiliated Afghan evacuees from Afghanistan and to arrange their onward transport and resettlement.
- Operation Allies Refuge – Evacuation of personnel from Kabul in August 2021 as the Taliban took over the country.
- Exercise Amalgam Virgo – A North American Aerospace Defense Command counter-terrorist and field training exercise (FTX) carried out in Tyndall Air Force Base, Florida in early June 2001.
- Amalgam Warrior – North American Aerospace Defense Command air defense exercise
- Operation Amber Star – Delta Force and Intelligence Support Activity anti-Persons Indicted for War Crimes (PIFWC) reconnaissance and surveillance, Bosnia-Herzegovina
- Ample Gain – See Ample Train
- Exercise Ample Strike – In August and September 2017, the 307th Bomb Wing supported and participated in Exercise Ample Strike, which was Czech Republic led with two B-52s and two B-1s. This was a critical, annual exercise meant to increase proficiency levels of all forward air controllers and joint terminal air controllers, as well as to improve standardization and interoperability across NATO Allies and partners that included multiple European countries.
- Ample Train (previously Ample Gain) – Exercise "initiated to improve the ability of NATO's Air Forces to work on and with each others aircraft; ground servicing crews from one nation [worked] with air crew and aircraft from other nations."
- Anatolian Eagle – an air force exercise hosted by the Turkish Air Force (TAF) and held in Konya, Turkey. There are both national and international exercises held, the international exercises usually involving air arms of the United States, other NATO forces, and Asian countries. The first exercise, Anatolian Eagle 01, was held by TAF Operations Command on 18–29 June 2001. As well as Turkey, the air forces of USA and Israel also participated.
- Exercise Anchor Express – In late February and early March 1986, 2nd Battalion, 4th Marines deployed to Nordland and Troms counties of Norway, near Evenes and Brøstadbotn, as the main US ski-mobile maneuver element of the 4th Marine Amphibious Brigade commanded by then Brigadier General Carl E. Mundy Jr., taking a leading role in the multi-national NATO winter exercise, "Anchor Express". The wintry, subfreezing weather, unprecedented level of snow, and the rugged terrain in the operating area of "Anchor Express" astride Salangenfjord, Faksfjorden and Lavangenfjord tested 2/4's ski-borne Marines to their limits. Such was the deep snow, extremely steep mountains in fjord country and gusty subzero winds that on 5 March 1986, a devastating avalanche in Vassdalen, Nordland, struck 31 fellow-Norwegian soldiers, killing sixteen engineers from the elite Norwegian Army unit Brigade North, many of whose soldiers operating with 2/4 during the exercise. The Vassdalen avalanche was Norway's worst disaster involving the military since the German invasion of Norway (1940). As a result, Norway went into mourning and the force-on-force exercise prematurely ended.
- Operation Anchor Guard – 10 August 1990 – 9 March 1991. Following the Iraqi invasion of Kuwait of 2 August 1990, Boeing E-3 Sentry aircraft of the NATO Airborne Early Warning Force were moved to Konya, Turkey to monitor the situation. The aircraft remained at Konya to maintain surveillance of south-eastern Turkey throughout the crisis, which led to the Gulf War of January–March 1991.
- Exercise Anorak Express – NATO exercise in 1980. In January 1980, USS Saipan (LHA-2) was out to sea to an amphibious landing at Cape Code in preparation for the exercise. Sailing February 14 for Northern Norway, the ship entered her first operational deployment.
- Arabian Gauntlet - CENTCOM/United States Fifth Fleet mine clearance and Sea lines of communication exercise. Held 1999–2005.
- Arcade - NATO Allied Command Europe Rapid Reaction Corps exercise series preparatory to deployment.

Arcade Azimuth
Arcade Bugle
Arcade Falcon
ARRCade Fusion, the annual computer-assisted warfighting Command Post Exercise
Arcade Globe
Arcade Guard.

- Operation Arc Light – B-52 operations in Southeast Asia, primarily bombing the Socialist Republic of Vietnam (North Vietnam); South Vietnam; and Cambodia. Bombing Cambodian border areas was intended to hinder North Vietnamese use of the Ho Chi Minh Trail supply line to South Vietnam.
- Operation Argus – Series of low-yield, high-altitude nuclear testing and missile tests secretly conducted from 27 August to 9 September 1958 over the South Atlantic
- Operation Arid Farmer – 1983 Support to the crisis in Chad
- Ardent Sentry – annual U.S. Northern Command homeland security/defense exercise.
- Armada Sweep – U.S. Navy electronic surveillance from ships off the coast of East Africa to support drone operations in the region.
- Project Arrow – 1955 project by Air Defense Command to replace its post World War II air defense groups with fighter groups with "memorable recrds" in the two World Wars
- Operation Assured Delivery – United States Department of Defense (DOD) logistical support to humanitarian aid efforts in Georgia following the Russo-Georgian War in 2008.
- Assured Lift – a Joint Task Force carried out move of Economic Community of West African States Monitoring Group cease-fire monitoring troops into Liberia, March–April 1997, from Abidjan. See also European Command documentation.
- Assured Response – a Joint Task Force carried out Non-combatant evacuation operation from Monrovia, Liberia, 8 April-12 August 1996. Run by Special Operations Command, Europe.
- Exercise Atlantic Guard – Canadian interagency homeland security exercise (May 2002, Land Forces Atlantic Area (LFAA))
- Exercise Atlantic Shield – Canadian interagency homeland security exercise (12 May 2003, hosted by Halifax Port Authority
- Exercise Atlantic Spear – Canadian interagency homeland security exercise (18-22 November 2002, hosted by LFAA)
- Atlantic Trident - trilateral air combat / coordination exercise involving U.S., UK, and France. Led by United States Air Forces in Europe - Air Forces Africa. 2025 iteration taking place in Finland.
- Atlas – U.S. European Command/Africa Command African and sometimes European operation first word
  - Atlas/Central Accord – Started by U.S. European Command in 1996, at which time it was called Atlas Drop. United States Africa Command (USAFRICOM) took over the exercise in 2008, and renamed it Atlas Accord in 2012. This put it in line with AFRICOM's other “Accord series” exercises, which focus on training African ground forces. Atlas Accord 12 was an AFRICOM Mali-based medical exercise conducted in Mopti, Mali, on 7–15 February 2012 despite the cancellation of Flintlock 12. The joint-aerial-delivery exercise, hosted by U.S. Army Africa, brought together Army personnel with African armed forces to enhance air drop capabilities and ensure effective delivery of military resupply materials and humanitarian aid.
  - Atlas Eagle – in 2009 described as "Train forces capable of conducting joint and combined U.S., air, and land combat interoperability operations."
  - Atlas Drop – from 1997 to 2003, U.S.-Tunisian exercise
  - Atlas Response – response to Mozambique floods of 2001
  - Atlas Vision – peacekeeping exercise with Russia. Atlas Vision 2012 appears to have been the first of a series, according to commentators at Small Wars Journal. Atlas Vision 2013 took place in Germany. U.S. European Command had been in the planning stages for Atlas Vision 2014, which was to take place in July in Chelyabinsk (Chelyabinsk Oblast), and focus on joint peace-keeping operations. Because of the beginning of the Russian invasion of Ukraine in 2014, “all planning for this exercise has been suspended.”
- Attain Document – in 1986, the US Navy began several "Freedom of Navigation" operations in the area around Libya, the first two parts of the operation being held from January 26–30, and February 12–15 without incident. The third part began on 23 March 1986 and led to the Action in the Gulf of Sidra (1986).
- Operation Attleboro – U.S. and Army of the Republic of Vietnam (ARVN) air mobile operations in Tây Ninh
- Operation Auburn Endeavor 1998 – relocation of uranium fuel from Tbilisi, Georgia.
- Exercise Austere Challenge – October 2012 US-Israel military exercise (missile defense). Austere Challenge '15 was a warfighting exercise conducted across several locations in the U.S. European Command area, which involved participation by the 1 (German/Netherlands) Corps.
- Austere Strike – U.S. Air Force system utilizing an electro-optical seeker and tracker for acquisition and tracking missions flown by McDonnell Douglas F-4 Phantom II aircraft.
- Autumn Forge – A series of NATO exercises conducted each year in Allied Command Europe (ACE) during the Cold War. It began in 1975 linking a number of training exercises under a common scenario, to present a more potent public image. Autumn Forge 83.
- Operation Autumn Return – non-combatant evacuation operation (NEO) in Côte d'Ivoire, September–October 2002.
- Operation Avid Recovery – U.S. European Command activities with Nigerian and British service personnel in clearing unexploded ordnance left over after the 2002 Lagos armoury explosion at Ikeja Cantonment, Lagos, on 27 January 2002. U.S. Explosive Ordnance Disposal soldiers helped to "stabilize" the cantonment area, as well as "providing safety training to the public and special ordnance handling training" for Nigerian Armed Forces personnel.
- Joint Task Force Aztec Silence – European Command "established Joint Task Force Aztec Silence under the Commander of the U.S. Sixth Fleet in December 2003 to counter transnational terrorism in the under-governed areas of Northern Africa and to build closer alliances with those governments. In support of this, U.S. Navy intelligence, surveillance and reconnaissance assets Lockheed P-3 Orions based in Sigonella, Sicily were used to collect and share information with U.S. [partners] and their militaries. This robust cooperative ISR effort was augmented by the release of intelligence collected by national assets."

=== B ===
- Baby Bonnet – Operation during the Cuban Missile Crisis by RB-47 Stratojets of the 55th Strategic Reconnaissance Wing to locate the Soviet tanker Grozny, operating from Lajes Air Base
- Operation Babylift – Mass evacuation/airlift of orphans from South Vietnam to the U.S. and other countries
- Balikatan – Joint exercises with the Armed Forces of the Philippines, numbered by year. Includes Balikatan 2025.
- Baker Blade – Classified exercise.
- Baker Mint – Exercise conducted by the US Army and Malaysia
- * Baker Mint 99-1 – Conducted by the US Army and Malaysia in 1999. Trained on military intelligence and photo-surveillance.
- * Baker Mint Lens 99 – Conducted by the US Army and Malaysia in 1999
- Baker Mondial V – Exercise conducted by the US Army and Mongolia in 1997. Trained on medical procedures.
- Baker Mongoose II – Conducted by the US Army and Mongolia in 1995.
- Baker Piston Lens 2000 – Conducted by the US Army and the Philippines in 2000.
- Baker Tepid – A series of eight exercises conducted by the US Army and Thailand.
- Baker Torch – A series of three exercises conducted by the US Army and Thailand from 1999 to 2001. Trained on border control.
  - Baker Torch Lens – Conducted by the US Army and Thailand. Trained on diving.
- Bamboo Eagle - exercise practicing air warfare against the People's Republic of China in a degraded environment. The exercise “… replicated the challenges of conducting long-range missions in the Indo-Pacific, including how we integrate aircraft and other systems across all domains,” providing aviators with a “highly complex and realistic training opportunity.” As part of the Agile Combat Employment concept, teams operated from hub-and-spoke locations, including across California, Hawaii, and Guam. Began 2024.
- Banner – First word for withdrawal of USAF units from Thailand in extension of Keystone operations.
  - Banner Star – Inactivation of 43d Tactical Electronic Warfare Squadron, 556th Civil Engineering Squadron (Heavy Repair), 609th Special Operations Squadron, discontinuance of F-102 detachment at Udorn and movement of planes to Clark Air Base, consolidating F-105s at Takhli, reduction of C-121s of 553d Reconnaissance Wing by one third.
  - Banner Sun – Ended USAF activities at Takhli Royal Thai Air Force Base; inactivated 355th Tactical Fighter Wing, moved F-105s to Kadena Air Base, moved one squadron of Wild Weasel aircraft to Korat, reduced 553d Reconnaissance Wing to a squadron, moved 11th Tactical Reconnaissance Squadron to United States, discontinued F-102 detachment at Don Muang and movement of planes to Clark Air Base.
- Bar None – Strategic Air Command exercise to test operational effectiveness of a wing. Name replaced by Buy None.
- Operation Barrel Roll – Air interdiction in northern and central Laos against Pathet Lao and North Vietnamese Army forces
- Operation Bat Cat – EC-121R electronic surveillance of the Ho Chi Minh Trail
- Exercise Battle Griffin – amphibious exercise practicing reception, staging, and operation of a Marine Air-Ground Task Force in defense of Northern Norway. Also involved UK, Netherlands. In 1991 Exercise Battle Griffin took place in February–March. That year the 2nd Marine Expeditionary Brigade made the first test of the Norway Air-Landed Marine Expeditionary Brigade plan. It was composed completely of Marine Corps Reserve units as Operation Desert Storm was getting under way. The force comprised HQ Company 25th Marines, 3/25 Marines, Co E, 4th Reconnaissance Battalion, and 1st Battalion, 14th Marines (artillery, composed of HQ, Alpha, and Bravo Batteries). Battle Griffin 93; Battle Griffin 96.
- Beacon Flash – U.S.-Oman dissimilar air combat exercise going back to the 1970s. Carrier Air Wing 1 flying from USS America (CV-66) carried out at least two Beacon Flash exercises in the first half of 1983 (Command History 1983).
- Beggar Shadow - late-1960s U.S. Navy reconnaissance program that collected intelligence about and communications between Soviet Bloc states while remaining safely (at least according to international laws) in international waters. The EC-121 shot down by North Korea in 1969 was on a "Beggar Shadow" mission.
- Bell Tone – US Air Force air defense detachment at Don Muang Air Base from 1961
- Bent Spear – A Chairman of the Joint Chiefs of Staff term identifying and reporting a significant nuclear weapon incident involving a nuclear weapon or warhead, nuclear components, or vehicle when nuclear

loaded. This term includes a significant incident as defined in DoD Directive 5100.52.

- Operation Bield Kirk – Unarmed reconnaissance of the Farabundo Martí National Liberation Front and Armed Forces of El Salvador by Lockheed AC-130 Spectre gunships, operating from Howard Air Force Base. Renamed Operation Blue Flame when operation's name was compromised.
- Operation Big Buzz – a DOD entomological warfare field test probably conducted by the Army Chemical Corps in the U.S. state of Georgia in 1955.
- Big Eva – Headquarters US Air Force project, test program determining serviceability of the long-range AN/ARC-21 aircraft HF Single-sideband (SSB) radio system
- Big Eye – Original name of College Eye Task Force, 1965–1967
- Big Gun – 1965 deployment of F-104 Starfighters from Webb AFB to Ramey AFB.
- Big Horn – Forward deployment of B-47 Stratojets to Adana Air Base.
- Operation Big Itch was an entomological warfare field test using uninfected fleas to determine their coverage and survivability as a vector for biological agents. The tests were conducted at Dugway Proving Ground in 1954.
- Exercise Big Pine – Combined Honduras and US Navy exercise in 1983 with the Navy deploying two carrier battle groups off the coast of Honduras.
- Big Safari – a United States Air Force program begun in 1952 which provides management, direction, and control of the acquisition, modification, and logistics support for special purpose weapons systems derived from existing aircraft and systems.
- Operation Big Star – Minuteman Mobility Test Train rail-mobile test of deployment of Minuteman ICBMs, 1960.
- Black Spot – Fairchild C-123Ks modified with sensors and capability to drop cluster bombs for night interdiction operations over the Ho Chi Minh Trail.
- Birds Eye – July 1956 deployment of B-47 Stratojets and KC-97 Stratofreighters to Adana Air Base, Turkey to test the base's ability to recover aircraft following a strike on the Soviet Union.
- Operation Blade Jewel – the return of military dependents to the U.S. at the time of the United States invasion of Panama.
- Blind Bat – C-130 flare drop and forward air control operations from Thailand.
- Operation Blinking Light – Continuation of Operation Blue Flame (originally Operation Bield Kirk) after c. 1986. In August 1988 operations were conducted from Palmerola Air Base, Honduras, but returned to Howard Air Force Base due to logistical problems. Discontinued in 1989.
- Operation Blowdown – Explosives test carried out in Australia's Cape York Peninsula Kutini-Payamu jungle in 1963, simulating the effect of a nuclear weapon on tropical rainforest
- Blue Banner – Strategic Air Command KC-97 Stratofreighter maritime reconnaissance flights for Atlantic Command from Kindley Air Force Base, Bermuda and Lajes Air Base, Azores during the Cuban Missile Crisis
- Operation Blue Bat – Deployment of Composite Air Strike Force to Lebanon in 1958
- Blue Eagle – Airborne command and control for Pacific Command, mostly operating EC-135J aircraft at Hickam Air Force Base.
- Operation Blue Flame – Continuation of Operation Bield Kirk after operation name was compromised in 1984. Renamed Operation Blinking Light.
- Blue Springs – Joint Chiefs of Staff directive for photographic reconnaissance in Southeast Asia using SAC Ryan Model 147 drones. First mission flown from Kadena Air Base 20 August 1964. Moved to Bien Hoa Air Base in October 1964. Included missions over China. Renamed Bumble Bug on 1 August 1967.
- Operation Blue Tree – US Air Force photographic reconnaissance missions over North Vietnam.
- Bold Alligator – post Cold War Pacific Fleet amphibious exercise, with foreign participation.
- Bold Quest – In 2013, Marine Corps Air Station Cherry Point hosted warfighters, technology teams and testers from 10 states and each of the U.S. military services for the 11th Bold Quest coalition demonstration. Cherry Point was chosen for its ideal location for hosting East Coast military assets, and supported two U.S. Navy warships operating offshore. Nearly 1,800 military personnel from the U.S. and partners participated in Bold Quest 17.2 in Savannah, Georgia, the latest in a series of coalition capability demonstration and assessment events sponsored by the Joint Staff. Over the course of 18 days in October–November, members of the U.S. armed services, National Guard, U.S. Special Operations Command, NATO Headquarters and 16 partner states participated in the demonstration, which collected technical data on systems and subjective judgments from the warfighters using them.
- Operation Bolo – 1967 decoy mission to disguise the electronic signature of combat aircraft during the Vietnam War
- Bounty Hunter – counter-space electronic warfare system located at Peterson Air Force Base, tested by 17th Test Squadron on behalf of United States Space Force during February 2020.
- Exercise Bright Star – U.S./Egypt, downsizing
- Brass Bell - 1956 study concept by Bell Aerospace. Allocated Weapons System 459L. Precursor to X-20 Dyna-Soar.
- Brass Knob – Strategic Air Command Lockheed U-2 photographic reconnaissance during the Cuban Missile Crisis
- Exercise Brim Frost – exercise by U.S. forces in Alaska, earlier known as Exercise Jack Frost.
- Brown Cradle – Electronic warfare modification package for Douglas EB-66 aircraft
- Broken Arrow - A Chairman of the Joint Chiefs of Staff term to identify and report an accident involving a nuclear weapon or warhead or nuclear component.
- Operation Brother Sam – US government contingency plan to support the military coup that overthrew the Brazilian constitutional president João Goulart, if the coup had faced armed resistance
- Buckskin Rider – one of numerous exercises 40th Air Division, USAF, took part in 1951–89 time period.
- Operation Buffalo Hunter – Drone reconnaissance operations over North Vietnam
- Bullet Blitz – Operational testing and evaluation of Short Range Attack Missiles from B-52 Stratofortresses at Holloman Air Force Base, New Mexico, starting in 1973
- Operation Bullet Shot – temporary duty assignment of US-based technicians to Andersen Air Force Base, Guam, during the Vietnam War. Known as "the herd shot 'round the world".)
- Bumble Bug – Photographic reconnaissance in Southeast Asia using SAC Ryan Model 147 drones. Replaced Blue Springs on 1 August 1967. Renamed Bumpy Action in December 1968
- Bumpy Action – Ryan AQM-34 (formerly Model 147) drone reconnaissance missions over Southeast Asia from December 1968. Formerly Bumble Bug. Mostly low level missions, when high resolution photography was required, or cloud cover prevented SR-71 photography. After October 1969, included missions as far as 200 miles into China. Operations moved to U-Tapao Royal Thai Naval Airfield in July 1970.
- Burning Wind – a codename for signals intelligence (SIGINT) missions by the United States Air Force. The missions are undertaken by RC-135 Rivet Joint aircraft. Other missions undertaken by Rivet Joint aircraft may be designated Misty Wind.
- Operation Burnt Frost – interception and destruction of a non-functioning U.S. National Reconnaissance Office (NRO) satellite named USA-193. A launch from the cruiser Lake Erie took place on February 20, 2008.
- Busy – Strategic Air Command first word programs

- Busy Plotter – Program to increase proficiency of Strategic Air Command navigators by training them using Air Training Command Boeing T-43 aircraft, rather than the more expensive B-52s, due to high fuel costs from 1979 to October 1981.
- Busy Sentry – Strategic Air Command exercise for intercontinental ballistic missile units.
- Busy Sentry II – Strategic Air Command Single Integrated Operational Plan (SIOP) 4D missile training assistance program
- Busy Player – Exercise which included participation of 40th Air Division (in 1951–89 period).
- Busy Usher – Strategic Air Command launch of No. 13 LF-02 missile MK-1 Minuteman-II

- Button Up – Strategic Air Command security system reset procedures used during Minuteman facility wind down
- Buy None – Strategic Air Command exercise to test operational effectiveness of wings. Name replaced Bar None. Included participation of 40th Air Division in 1951–89 period.

=== C ===
- Operation Calm Support 1998–1999 – Support to Kosovo Diplomatic Observer Mission mission.
- Cardinal Point - Cold War U.S. Army Europe exercise developed initially by then-Major General Paul F. Gorman.
- Operation Carolina Moon – Attack on the Thanh Hoa Bridge by Lockheed C-130 aircraft using large magnetic mines dropped upriver from the bridge to float under the bridge and explode
- Exercise Carte Blanche – NATO atomic warfare exercise, circa 1955, which the 21st Fighter-Bomber Group took part in, vicinity of Central Europe.
- Project Catalyst/Catalyst II - United States and UK development and acquisition program for technology enhancements to subsystems of Prophet (US Department of Defense) and Soothsayer (UK Ministry of Defence) SIGINT systems.
- Operation Cedar Falls – Attack on National Front for the Liberation of South Vietnam (NVA or Viet Cong) positions in Bến Cát (the Iron Triangle)
- Cedar Sweep – flights in 2010 by 9th Reconnaissance Wing from RAF Akrotiri, Cyprus, surveillance over Lebanon, relaying information about Hezbollah militants to Lebanese authorities. See Highland Warrior.
- Celestial Balance – 2009 Baraawe raid in Somalia that killed Saleh Ali Saleh Nabhan
- Operation Centennial Contact – An operation of the United States Air Force and National Guard conducted on 27 June 2023 to commemorate the 100-year anniversary of the first aerial refueling. Aircraft from various bases conducted aerial refueling exercises across the United States, as well conducting flyovers in 50 states. A total of 152 aircraft were slated to participate in the operation, with 82 tanker aircraft providing refueling support to 70 other participating aircraft.
- Exercise Central Enterprise – NATO Allied Forces Baltic Approaches/Allied Forces Central Europe exercise, "designed to test the integrated air defense system throughout Western Europe. Regular exercises which incorporate a major military low flying element over the United Kingdom include Central Enterprise (once a year), Mallet Blow (twice a year), OSEX (once a year) and Salty Hammer (once a year). Some of these exercises test and practice the United Kingdom Air Defence Region while others allow aircrew to practice tactical low flying techniques. The June 1982 Central Enterprise exercise marked the first practical test of the new NATO airborne early warning system." 1997 included deployment of 301st Fighter Wing, Air Force Reserve.
- Project CHECO – HQ US Air Force directed PACAF project established in 1962 to document and analyze air operations in Southeast Asia. CHECO was an acronym whose definition changed over time.
- Operation Chopper – Major air mobile offensive near Saigon
- Operation Chrome Dome – Strategic Air Command airborne alert indoctrination training.
- Circuit Gold – On 7 November 1973 Commander in Chief, U.S. Pacific Fleet (CINCPACFLT) announced the deployment of a "Circuit Gold" Navy special multi-sensor Lockheed P-3A aircraft to monitor units of the Soviet Navy. Two such aircraft were assigned to the United States Pacific Fleet, operated by VP-4.
- Project Clearwater – 1964 withdrawal of Convair F-102 interceptor units from Europe
- Cobra – Headquarters USAF First word code name programs
  - Cobra Ball – Boeing RC-135 reconnaissance aircraft
  - Cobra Dane – AN/FPS-108 Cobra Dane passive electronically scanned array (PESA) phased array radar installation operated by Raytheon for the United States Air Force at Eareckson Air Station, Alaska. It was built in 1976 and brought on-line in 1977 to verify Soviet compliance with the SALT II arms limitation treaty.
  - Cobra Eye – Boeing RC-135X reconnaissance aircraft with mission of tracking intercontinental ballistic missile reentry vehicles. In 1993, it was converted into an additional RC-135S Cobra Ball. The sole aircraft was converted during the mid-to-late-1980s from a C-135B Telemetry/Range Instrumented Aircraft, serial number 62–4128.
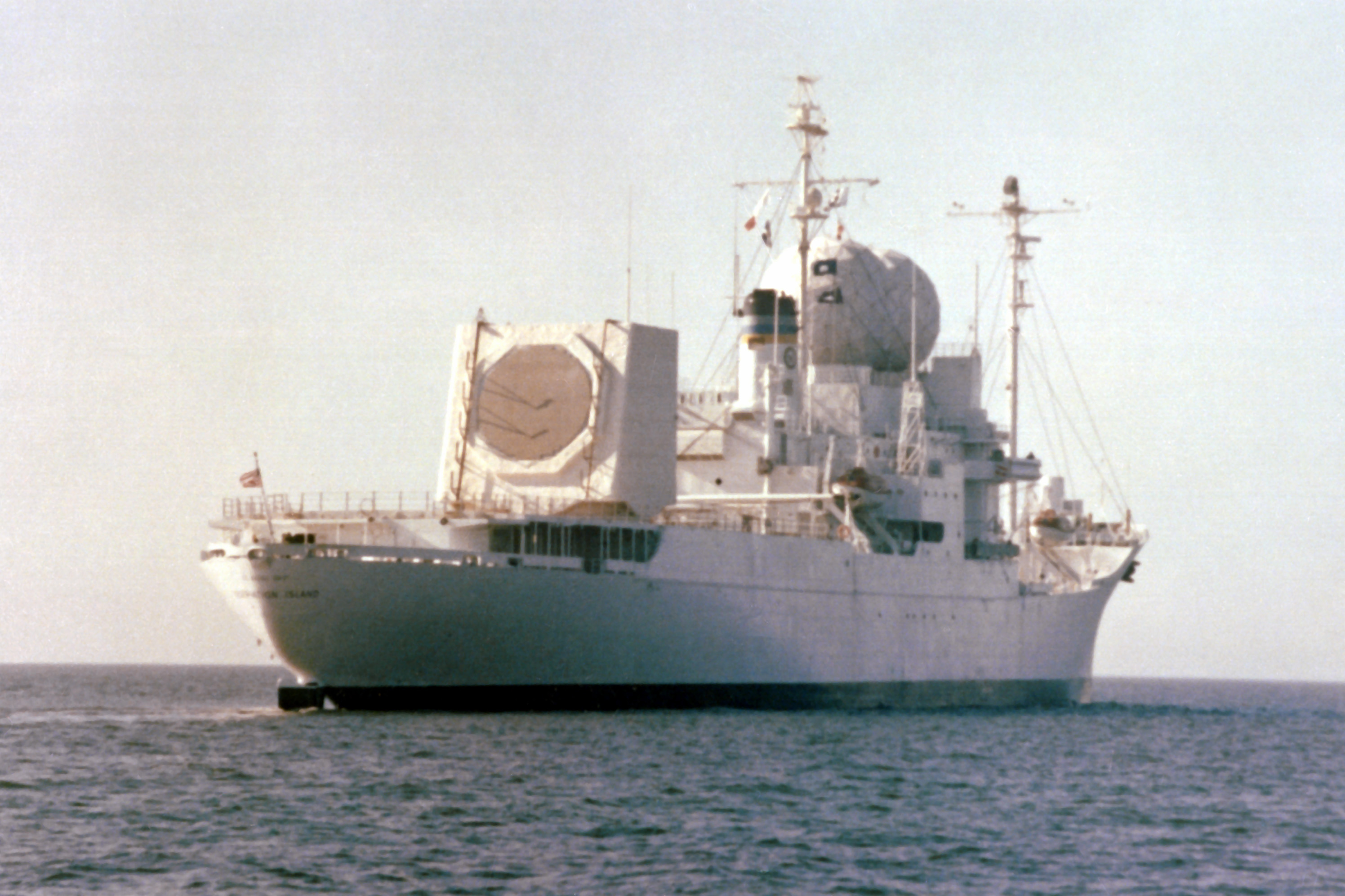
    Aft view of the USNS Observation Island showing the location of the Cobra Judy array.
  - Cobra Gemini – Transportable dual frequency (S- and X-band) radar designed to collect precise Scientific and Technical Intelligence (S&TI) data against Rest of World (RoW) medium range ballistic missiles.
  - Cobra Jaw – KC-135T reconnaissance program, later converted to RC-135T Rivet Dandy
  - Cobra Judy – AN/SPQ-11 passive electronically scanned array (PESA) radar mounted aboard the missile range instrumentation ship USNS Observation Island (T-AGM-23) up until 2014.
  - Cobra King – radar/intelligence programs
  - Cobra Mist – Anglo-American experimental over-the-horizon radar station at Orford Ness, Suffolk, England. It was known technically as AN/FPS-95 and sometimes referred to as System 441a; a reference to the project as a whole.
  - Cobra Shoe – reported Over The Horizon (Backscatter) (OTH-B) radar designed by RCA Corporation, designed to monitor ballistic missile tests in the interior of the Soviet Union, installed in the Western Sovereign Base Area (Akrotiri), Cyprus. Source is "U.S. declassified documents". Installed since around 1964; no details on when/whether it left service.
- Cobalt Blue, Poison Scepter - targets/locations for surveillance cameras along the coast of Somalia, 2002.
- College – First word used by Air Defense Command (later Aerospace Defense Command)
  - Operation College Cadence – Deployment of Convair F-106 aircraft to Korea to reinforce air defenses after the Pueblo Incident.
  - College Caper – Transfer of fourteen EB-57 Canberras from Stewart AFB to Ramstein AB.
  - College Eye – Lockheed EC-121 aircraft flying from bases in Thailand to provide radar coverage over Laos and North Vietnam
  - College Men – Deployment of Lockheed EC-121s to McCoy AFB when President Nixon was in Florida. Later Family Man.
  - College Shoes – 1963-1970 deployment of eight Convair F-106s to Elmendorf AFB for Alaskan air defense.
  - College Shaft – Deployment of Convair F-106s from Loring AFB to Goose Air Base to respond to Soviet aircraft penetrations of the Atlantic Air Defense Identification Zone.
  - College Tonic – 1964 deployment of Convair F-102s from Richards-Gebaur AFB to Panama.
- Combat – Headquarters USAF First word code name programs
  - Combat Angel – 1970s tactical electronic warfare drone system.
  - Combat Apple
  - Combat Arrow – United States Air Forces in Europe program for MC-130E Combat Talons
  - Combat Archer – Reconnaissance program, later an Air Combat Command weapons system evaluation program. (See Combat Hammer) at Tyndall AFB and Nellis AFB.
  - Combat Challenge – Air Force-wide command, control, communications, and computers competition
  - Combat Dawn
  - Combat Hammer – Weapons systems test and evaluation at Eglin AFB and Utah test ranges, testing air-to-ground weapons. (See Combat Archer)
  - Combat Knife – Tactical Air Command program for MC-130E Combat Talons
  - Combat Lancer – Deployment of General Dynamics F-111s to Thailand
  - Combat Lightning – "Tactical control and airspace management system designed to correlate, direct and monitor tactical air operations involving North Viet Nam. This encompassed the issuing of border warnings, SAM and MIG warnings, advising aircraft of current enemy defenses and coordinating overall air operations in North Vietnam"
  - Combat Pink
  - Combat Sent – Boeing RC-135U electronic reconnaissance aircraft designed to collect scientific & technical intelligence from adversary radar emissions. The data helps develop new or upgraded radar warning receivers, radar jammers, decoys, anti-radiation missiles, and training simulators.
  - Combat Shadow – Modification program for MC-130P Combat Shadow Combat search and rescue aircraft
  - Combat Skyspot – AN/MSQ-77 radar controlled bombing missions
  - Combat Spear – MC-130E Combat Talon modification program
  - Combat Talon – Modification program for MC-130E/Hs to become special operations aircraft with low-altitude deep-penetration mission capabilities
  - Combat Track II – Command satellite-to-aircraft communication system with low probability of intercept or detection, deployed on B-2 Spirit, B-52 Stratofortress and B-1 Lancer aircraft.
  - Combat Tree – AN/APX-80 equipment installed on McDonnell F-4D Phantom II aircraft to enable them to locate and identify Vietnam People's Air Force aircraft by interrogating their Identification Friend or Foe (IFF) equipment. Included modifications to the F-4D adding an attachment point for an electronic countermeasures pod to the inboard pylon allowing it to carry both the ECM pod and two additional AIM-9J Sidewinder missiles.
- Comfy Levy – Volant Solo EC-130Es using palletized electronics and clip on antennas to conduct Senior Scout and Senior Hunter missions with operators from Electronic Security Command.
- Commando - USAF first word code word for various USAF Special operations programs
  - Commando Bearcat, Commando Jade, and Commando Night – regional exercises supported by 314th Air Division, Fifth Air Force, in South Korea, 1955–84.
  - Commando Buzz – 1970 Employment of Coronet Solo EC-121s to aid the Cambodian Government by rebroadcasting civil radio broadcasts to remote areas of the country.
  - Commando Club – US operation of the Vietnam War which used command guidance of aircraft by radar at Lima Site 85 in Laos for ground-directed bombing (GDB) of targets in North Vietnam and clandestine targets in Laos.
  - Operation Commando Hunt – Interdiction of the Ho Chi Minh Trail, 1968–1972. Individual phases were identified by roman numerals, with odd numbers used for dry season operations and even numbers for wet season operations
  - Exercise Commando Sling – Approximately three deployments of USAF F-15s and F-16s from both Active Duty and National Guard units from around the world are made each year to Singapore under this title. The 497th Combat Training Flight takes part in regional exercise and global contingencies, and provides housing; morale, recreation and welfare facilities and programs: medical services; force protection to resources and personnel; and legal, financial, communications, and contracting support to assigned and deployed personnel.
  - Operation Commando Sabre – Use of North American F-100F aircraft as 'fast FACs" in Southeast Asia
  - Commando Solo – Volant Solo psychological warfare program renamed with upgrades to EC-130Es (and later EC-130Js). Originally Coronet Solo with EC-121Ss.
- Compass - USAF first word code name for various drone/RPV and SIGINT/ECM programs
  - Compass Arrow – Originally Lone Eagle. Design of longer range reconnaissance drone starting in 1966. Ryan AQM-91 Firefly
  - Compass Call – EC-130H electronic warfare aircraft. Programmed for upgrade to EC-37Bs,
  - Compass Cookie – Ryan AQM-34N high altitude drones modified to optimize intercept of Soviet S-75 Dvina (U.S. designation SA-2) surface to air missile downlink signals. Deployed to U-Tapao Royal Thai Navy Airfield, with missions flown in September 1972.
  - Compass Cope – Unmanned aerial vehicle testing.
  - Compass Dart – Project Phyllis Ann airborne radio direction finding in Vietnam renamed in spring 1967. Platforms redesignated from RC-47 to EC-47 and direction finding equipment from AN/ARD-18 to AN/ALR-34.
  - Compass Hammer - Development program for pod-mounted electro-optical laser turret anti-aircraft artillery countermeasures resulting in the AN/ALQ-179 system
  - Compass Tie - Development of AN/ALR-69 Radar Homing and Warning (RHAW) system installed on A-10 Thunderbolt II, AC-130U Spooky II, B-52H Stratofortress, F-4 Phantom II, F-16 Fighting Falcon, HH-53 Super Jolly Green Giant, Lockheed MC-130 aircraft
- Constant – Arkin lists this prefix as an 'Air force operations first word, often referring to Air Force Technical Applications Center and other reconnaissance missions. Constant programs in the 1980s included Constant Bore, Constant Dome, Constant Fish, Constant Globe, Constant Seek, and Constant Take.'

Arkin lists Constant subprograms included Constant Blue (Presidential successor helicopter evacuation plan), Constant Gate, Constant Help, Constant Phoenix (55th Wing nuclear monitoring) Constant Pisces, Constant Shotgun, Constant Source, Constant Spur, Constant Star, Constant Stare (an Air Intelligence Agency organization).

- Project Constant Growth – From October 1975 to July 1976 name of program to give copilots of heavy airlift and bombardment aircraft experience by flying smaller training aircraft. Nickname dropped and program retitled Accelerated Copilot Enrichment.
- Operation Constant Guard – Deployment of tactical aircraft to Southeast Asia in response to the 1972 Easter Offensive
- Constant Peg – evaluation of clandestinely-acquired Soviet fighter aircraft at Nellis Air Force Base, Nevada, by 4477th Test and Evaluation Squadron. The idea of a more realistic training program for the Air Force was devised by USAF Colonel Gail Peck, a Vietnam veteran F-4 pilot, who was dissatisfied with his service's fighter pilot training. After the war, he worked at the Department of Defense, where he heard about the Have Drill and Have Doughnut programs. He won the support of USAF General Hoyt S. Vandenberg, Jr. and launched "Constant Peg," named after Vandenberg's callsign, "Constant," and Peck's wife, Peg.
- Operation Continuing Promise – periodic series of US military exercises conducted under the direction of United States Southern Command. Designated by Roman numeral (“Continuing Promise I” was in 2007), or by year (“Continuing Promise 2009”); they provide medical, dental and veterinary aid to people in Latin America.
- Operation Cool Shoot – live missile firing exercise, held at Tyndall AFB, Florida, with participation of 21st Composite Wing, Alaskan Air Command.
- Exercise Cope North – an annual multinational military exercise taking place in and around Guam. The first exercise took place in 1978.
- Exercise Cope Thunder – A Pacific Air Forces (PACAF)-sponsored exercise initiated in 1976, Cope Thunder was devised as a way to give aircrews their first taste of warfare and quickly grew into PACAF's "premier simulated combat airpower employment exercise." Moved from Clark Air Base to Eielson Air Force Base in Alaska in 1992, permanently, after the eruption of Mount Pinatubo.
- Exercise Cope Tiger – USAF exercise in Thailand
- Copper Dune – Joint Special Operations Command strike operations in Yemen/Arabian Peninsula, 2011–2012.
- Project Cornrose – Study of the use of nuclear weapons to destroy dams and harbor infrastructure
- Corona South – the 72nd Bombardment Wing at Ramey Air Force Base in Puerto Rico hosted the annual United States Air Force Commander's Conferences, code named Corona South, which began on an irregular basis in 1955. By the 1960s, Corona South had become a regular annual event at Ramey. It continued until the wing was inactivated. Military Airlift Command then continued them until Ramey closed and they were transferred to Homestead Air Force Base, Florida.
- Coronet Bare – 1969 demonstration of "bare base" concept of deployment.
- Coronet Cobra – Deployment of Coronet Solo EC-121s to Korat Royal Thai Air Base.
- Coronet Giant – Direct flight from the United States to West Germany by 12 Fairchild Republic A-10 Thunderbolt II attack fighters, refuelled along the way by three KC-135s of the 126th Air Refueling Squadron Wisconsin Air National Guard, spring of 1984. The route spanned 3600 miles, and was the largest mission of this type undertaken by a National Guard force to date.
- Coronet Nighthawk – Operation Coronet Nighthawk was a Caribbean deployment of Air Force fighters.
- Coronet Oak – the continuing operation in which Air Force Reserve Command (AFRC) and Air National Guard (ANG) C-130 aircraft, aircrews and related support personnel deploy from the United States to Muñiz Air National Guard Base, Puerto Rico, to provide air transport for the U.S. Southern Command. The mission moved from Howard Air Force Base, Panama, as a result of the DOD withdrawal from Panama, from April 1999. Units rotate in and out of Muñiz ANGB every two weeks. Forces assigned to Coronet Oak provide United States Southern Command with logistic and contingency support throughout Central and South America. The mission typically covers embassy resupply, medical evacuations, and support of U.S. troops and/or the Drug Enforcement Administration.
- Coronet Solo – EC-121Ss modified for psychological warfare to broadcast radio and TV with electronic warfare capability. Renamed Volant Solo with introduction of EC-130Es.
- Crazy Hawk – Airborne Reconnaissance Low Multifunction airplane based on the DHC-7 (military designation RC-7, then RO-5C, EO-5C)
- Creek – USAFE first word
  - Creek Action – Command-wide effort by Hq USAFE to realign functions and streamline operations, 1973
  - Creek Caste – intelligence program/project
  - Creek Claw – intelligence program/project
  - Creek Defender - USAFE-AFAFRICA's only Ground Combat Readiness Training Center for deploying SF members.
  - Creek Fury – reconnaissance over East Germany / East Berlin using C-130E aircraft.
  - Creek Flush – Photo and ELINT intelligence program/project (circa 1975+)
  - Creek Klaxon – In 1986, the 119th Fighter-Interceptor Group (ND ARNG) assumed the USAF Zulu alert mission at Ramstein Air Base, West Germany. The 119th and other Reserve Component Air Defense units rotated to Ramstein and stood continuous air sovereignty alert for one year, provided for NATO.
  - Creek Party – Deployment of Air National Guard Boeing KC-97 tankers to Europe to support United States Air Forces Europe operations.
  - Creek Sand - under this codename, "dozens of U.S. personnel and contractors have come to Ouagadougou in recent years to establish a small air base on the military side of the international airport." "At the heart of the surveillance operations are small, unarmed turboprop aircraft disguised as private planes. Equipped with hidden sensors that can record full-motion video, track infrared heat patterns, and vacuum up radio and cellphone signals, the planes refuel on isolated airstrips.. extending their effective flight range by thousands of miles."
  - Creek Victor – intelligence program/project (circa 1980)
  - Creek Wind - U-2 eastern Mediterranean reconnaissance missions which supported Operation Enduring Freedom.
- Operation Crescent Wind – initial air attack against Taliban/Al Qaeda in Afghanistan after the September 11 terrorist attacks, from 7 October 2001.

=== D ===
- Dacian Star – Combined exercise with the Romanian Air Force, name is followed by year of exercise.
- Operation Dawn Blitz – Post 2010 amphibious exercise with foreign participation
- Exercise Dawn Patrol – A five-nation NATO naval and air exercise conducted throughout the Mediterranean in 1974. The U.S. contribution to the exercise was based on the USS America (CV-66) carrier battle group.
- Operation Deep Freeze Annual resupply operations for American scientific sites in Antarctica.
- Exercise Deep Furrow – 1960s-1970s Allied Forces Southern Europe exercise practicing the defense of Greece and Turkey.
- Deep Siren – Raytheon/RRK/Ultra Electronics Maritime Systems expendable "long-range acoustic tactical pager", launched via sub/surface/air-launched buoy (Jane's Defence Weekly (JDW) 21 Nov 2007).
- Operation Deliberate Force 1995 – NATO air strikes on Bosnian Serb military forces.
- Operation Deliberate Forge – The air phase of Operation Joint Forge, continuing operations in Bosnia-Herzegovina.
- Operation Deliberate Guard – The air phase of Operation Joint Guard, enforcing peacekeeping operations in Bosnia-Herzegovina.
- Demon Ape – From an acronym for Demonstration of Autonomous Collaborative Platform Performance and Effectiveness, part of the Collaborative Combat Aircraft program, including use of General Atomics XQ-67A remotely piloted aircraft (RPAs).
- Operation Deny Flight 1993–1995 – U.S./NATO enforcement of no-fly zone over Bosnia-Herzegovina.
- Operation Desert – various
  - Desert Calm – Alternate name for Desert Farewell
  - Desert Crossing 1999 – tested response to possible fall of Iraqi President Saddam Hussein.
  - Desert Farewell – 1991 return of US troops from the Near East and Turkey
  - Desert Fix - repair of United States Army Reserve equipment returning from the Middle East at Fort McCoy, Wisconsin, from 1991.
  - Operation Desert Fox 1998 – air strikes on Iraq WMD sites.
  - Operation Desert Lion began on 27 March 2003, during the War in Afghanistan (2001–2021). U.S. Army soldiers from the 505th Parachute Infantry Regiment launched an operation in the Kohe Safi Mountains and surrounding areas in the Kandahar Province of Afghanistan. Their mission was to hunt for supplies and members of the Taliban and Al-Qaida.
  - Operation Desert Shield
  - Operation Desert Storm – War to remove Iraq from Kuwait, 1991.
  - Operation Desert Strike – 1996 missile strikes on Iraq.
  - Operation Desert Thunder – buildup of forces against Iraq, January–May 1998. A new buildup of forces began in September, and then Operation Desert Fox took place in December.
- Destined Glory – Cold War NATO naval exercise, Mediterranean. Also held May 1995, 7–20 April 1997 - DG 97, and 5–22 May 1998. Also tested Multinational Amphibious Task Force concept, previous designated CAFMED until late 1999.
- Operation Determined Falcon 1998 – 80-aircraft NATO show of force over Albania near Kosovo.
- Operation Determined Forge – maritime component of Operation Joint Force (SFOR II).
- Operation Determined Guard – the first naval activity associated with Operation Joint Guard (the Stabilization Force (invariably known as "S-For") in Bosnia-Herzegovina).
- Determined Promise-03 (DP-03) was a two-week, multi-level exercise which started on August 18, 2002, with a simulated outbreak of pneumonic plague in Nevada, adding a hurricane, an air threat in Alaska, and a train wreck in Kentucky to the list of 1,700 'injects' that would crop up during the exercise. DP-03 was intended as the final testing event before the declaration of Full Operational Capability for U.S. Northern Command, with DHS and a total of 34 federal agencies represented.
- Dial Flower – code name concerned with the monitoring of French nuclear tests at Mururoa Atoll, French Polynesia, 1972 and 1973.
- Operation Dominic – 1962 United States nuclear weapons test program in the Pacific Proving Grounds in response to renewed Soviet nuclear weapons tests
- Project Dragon Lady – initial purchase of 31 Lockheed U-2 reconnaissance aircraft by the United States Air Force
- Operation Dragon Rouge – Airlift of Belgian troops to evacuate civilians during rebellion in the Congo, 1964.
- Dragon Spear - designation for Lockheed MC-130W
- Operation Dragoon Ride
- Project Drill Press – Modification of a Douglas C-47 Skytrain with airborne radio direction finding equipment. A predecessor of Project Phyllis Ann, although the single Drill Press aircraft had more sophisticated electronics.
- Dust Hardness – A modification improvement to Minuteman-III approved for service use in 1972

=== E ===
- Operation Eager Glacier – A secret United States effort to spy on Iran with aircraft in 1987 and 1988. The information gathered became part of an intelligence exchange between U.S. military intelligence services and Iraq during the Iran–Iraq War.
- Exercise Eager Light – In October 2012, more than 70 U.S. 1st Armored Division personnel deployed to Jordan to conduct Exercise Eager Light, a 30-day command post exercise that focuses on brigade-level warfighting tactics and procedures. This exercise dates back to the mid-1980s.
- Exercise Eager Lion – Eager Lion 12 took place in Jordan. Now the largest DOD exercise in the Middle East, surpassing Bright Star. The exercise "amounts to an outgrowth of the annual bilateral "Infinite Moonlight" US-Jordan exercise that stretches back to the 1990s." Now possibly involves Syrian Civil War contingencies.
- Operation Eagle Claw – Unsuccessful attempt to rescue hostages held by Iran in the American Embassy in Tehran.
- Operation Eagle Eye 1998–1999 – Monitoring compliance with United Nations Security Council Resolution 1199 in Kosovo.
- CONPLAN Eagle Guardian
- Operation Eagle Pull – Evacuation of Americans from Phnom Penh in April 1975.
- Operation Eagle's Summit (Oqab Tsuka in Pashto) – A military operation conducted by International Security Assistance Force and Afghan National Army troops, with the objective of transporting a 220-tonne turbine to the Kajaki Dam in Helmand Province through territory controlled by Taliban insurgents. 2008.
- Operation Earnest Will – 1987–1988 protection of tankers in the Persian Gulf from Iranian attack.

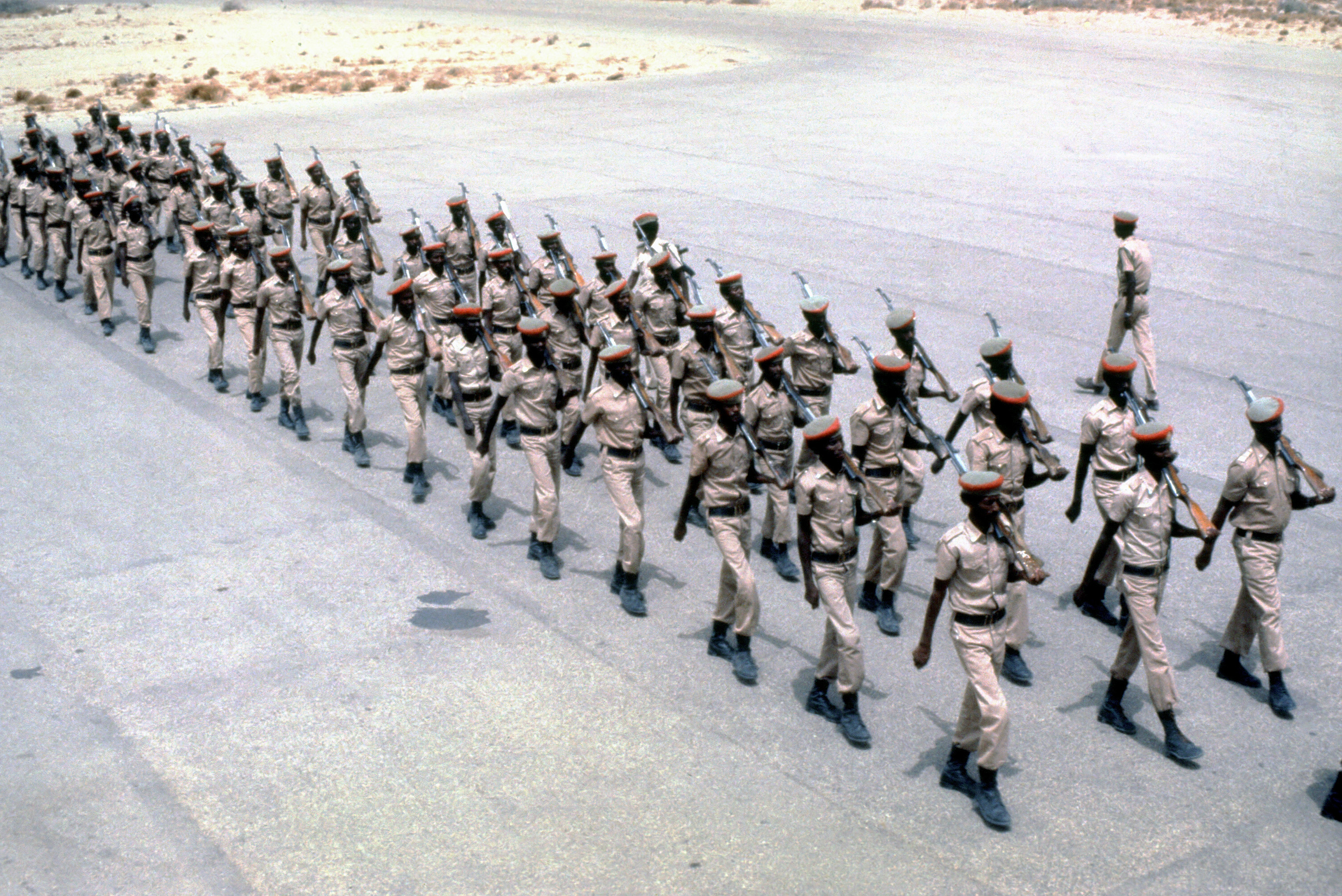
Somali troops passing in review during an Exercise Eastern Wind '83 ceremony

- Operation Eastern Exit – evacuation of the United States Ambassador to Somalia and Embassy in Mogadishu, Somalia, in 1991.
- Eastern Sentry - after the 2025 Russian drone incursion into Poland, on 12 September 2025, NATO Secretary General Mark Rutte announced that action to protect the alliance eastern borders would begin in the following days, involving military forces from Denmark, France, the United Kingdom, Germany, and others.
- Exercise Eastern Wind – exercises with Somali National Army, 1980s. Held 1983 as amphibious component of Bright Star, including the deployment of VMFA(AW)-242 flying Grumman A-6 Intruders to Berbera. The exercise "failed dismally"; "The Somali army did not perform up to any standard," one diplomat said. ..The inefficiency of the Somali armed forces is legendary among foreign military men." The 24th Marine Expeditionary Unit participated in Eastern Wind in August 1987 in the area of Geesalay. At sea USS Spiegel Grove, USS Saginaw (LST-1188), and USS La Moure County (LST-1194) took part as Amphibious Squadron 32/Commander Task Unit 76.8.2 from 2–9 August 1987.
- Eastern Venture – reported Warning Order issued for airlift support to famine relief operations in Sudan, covered by CENTCOM Command History 1985, page 30 (via www3.centcom.mil/FOIALibrary).
- Echo Casemate – Support of French and African peacekeeping forces in the Central African Republic.
- Operation El Dorado Canyon 1986 – USAF and USN air strikes on Libya in retaliation for terrorist bombing of La Belle Disco in West Berlin.
- Exercises Elder Forest, Elder Joust, were former NATO air defence exercises in the UK.
- Empty Quiver - refers to the seizure, theft, or loss of a functioning nuclear weapon.
- Operation Enduring Freedom – Anti-Al Qaeda operations in Afghanistan, including United States invasion of Afghanistan, War in Afghanistan (2001–2021), and other subsequent anti-terrorist operations.
- Operations Enhance and Enhance Plus in the Vietnam War transferred large quantities of United States military equipment and bases to the South Vietnamese government in advance of the Paris Peace Accords which ended American involvement in the war. The two operations were conducted between May and December 1972.
- Operation Essential Harvest 2001 – Successful NATO program to disarm National Liberation Army (NLA) in Macedonia.
- Exercise Evening Star is the annual test of the emergency response routines to a nuclear weapon accident at Faslane, HMNB Clyde. It is conducted by the Office for Nuclear Regulation. In 2011 the test failed as "a number of command and control aspects of the exercise were not considered to have been adequately demonstrated".
- Even Steven - in August 1970, two U-2Rs were deployed by the National Reconnaissance Office (NRO) to cover the Israeli-Egypt conflict.
- Exploring Sword – designation used for training exercises for I German/Dutch Corps
- Exile Hunter – Training of Ethiopian forces for operations in Somalia

=== F ===
- Faded Giant – An event involving a military nuclear reactor or other radiological accident not involving nuclear weapons, such as the SL-1 reactor explosion.
- Falling Leaves – improvised ballistic missile warning network created by the USAF during the Cuban Missile Crisis, 1962.
- Family Man – Continuation of College Men.
- Fan Song – NATO name for radar associated with Soviet SA-2 Guideline missiles
- Operation Fandango – Modification of B-45A Tornado bombers to carry nuclear weapons, operating from bases in the United Kingdom.
- Operation Farm Gate – 1961 deployment and subsequent operations in Vietnam of North American T-28 Trojan and Douglas B-26 Invader aircraft operated by the 4400th Combat Crew Training Squadron, officially to train South Vietnamese Air Force personnel
- Fast Race – Relocation of communications equipment from France following its withdrawal from the NATO Military Command Structure in the 1960s.
- Fast Talk – Strategic Air Command single side band high frequency radio net for command and control in the event of landline failure
- Exercise Fearless Guardian 2015 – U.S./Ukrainian training exercise. (total 2,200 participants, including 1,000 U.S. military). Initial personnel and equipment of the 173rd Airborne Brigade arrived in Yavoriv, Lviv Oblast, on 10 April 2015. Under the program, the United States trained three battalions of newly formed Ukrainian National Guard troops over a six-month period beginning in April 2015 under the Congress-approved Global Contingency Security Fund.
- Fervent Archer – European Command directed Joint Special Operations Command task force in Sarajevo from 2001. Believed to be a continuation of 'Amber Star' (see above).
- Field Goal – US Air Force top-secret RT-33A reconnaissance aircraft flights over Southeast Asia confirming communist activity in South Vietnam and Laos
- Fiery Vigil - evacuation of military and dependents from Clark Air Base in 1991 after the Eruption of Mount Pinatubo
- Fincastle Trophy – An antisubmarine warfare contest between the air forces of the United Kingdom, Australia, Canada and New Zealand. During the competition, crews compete in antisubmarine warfare, anti-surface warfare, and intelligence gathering, and surveillance.
- Operation Fishbowl – United States high-altitude nuclear tests in 1962, part of Operation Dominic nuclear test program
- Operation Flaming Dart – US air raids on North Vietnam on 7 and 11 February 1965 in response to Viet Cong attacks on American bases in South Vietnam
- Flexible Anvil/Sky Anvil 1998 – Planning for Balkan/Kosovo operations by ComSixthFleet to plan and be prepared to execute a limited strike option using YTLAM and CALCM missiles;Captain J. Stephen Hoefel (May 16, 2000). "U.S. Joint Task Forces in the Kosovo Conflict" (PDF). pp. ii, 4. Archived (PDF) from the original on July 3, 2021.,
- Operation Fluid Drive – evacuation of noncombatants from Lebanon, 1980s
- Operation Focus Relief – the movement and support of West African troops intended for dispatch to the United Nations Mission in Sierra Leone (UNAMSIL).
- Formidable Shield – seaborne Anti-Ballistic Missile exercise using NATO Military Command Structure to direct ships. Formidable Shield 2019 utilized Naval Striking and Support Forces NATO in northern UK waters.
- Fox Able – Transatlantic deployment of jet fighter aircraft.
  - Fox Able One – Deployment of a squadron of F-80 aircraft from Selfridge Air Force Base, Michigan to RAF Odiham, England in July 1948.
- Fox Peter—Transpacific deployment of jet fighter aircraft.
  - Fox Peter One – Deployment of a wing of Republic F-84G Thunderjets from California to Japan, using air refueling in July 1952.
- Operation Fracture Cross Alpha – Operation to prevent North Vietnamese interference with air operations supporting Operation Lam Son 719.
- Operation Fracture Deep – Plan to strike Vietnam People's Air Force bases south of 20th parallel. Combined with Operation Proud Bunch as Operation Proud Deep.
- Fracture Jaw - Commander U.S. Military Assistance Command Vietnam sought to ensure that nuclear weapons would be available for use in Vietnam in January 1968. Planning began to move nuclear weapons into South Vietnam so that they could be used on short notice against North Vietnamese troops. The project was abandoned in February 1968 after statements by Eugene McCarthy and others claimed that the U.S. was preparing to use nuclear weapons in Vietnam.
- Exercise Freedom Banner – Ann annual United States Marine Corps exercise is performed with rotating partner countries throughout the Pacific Rim.
- Operation Freedom Deal – Air interdiction and close air support strikes in Cambodia, 1970–1973.
- Operation Freedom Eagle – Part of Operation Enduring Freedom conducted in the Philippines
- Operation Freedom Falcon – 2011 military intervention in Libya
- Operation Freedom Sentinel (or Freedom's Sentinel) – Post 2015 operations in Afghanistan
- Exercise Freedom Shield – A Joint and Combined exercise in March 2025 in involving F-35s from the US Air Force, US Navy and Korean Air Force
- Freedom Torch II - Joint Chiefs of Staff (JCS) directed and coordinated exercise (source Parsch).
- Operation Freedom Train – Original name for Operation Linebacker I
- Freedom Vault - exercise held in March 1971 in South Korea to demonstrate the capability to deploy U.S. Strike Command units to an overseas area rapidly (source Parsch).
- Operation FRELOC (FRELOC=French Relocation) – Relocation of units and equipment from France following its withdrawal from the NATO Military Command Structure in the 1960s.
- Operation Frequent Wind – Evacuation of civilians from Saigon in April 1975.
- Operation Fresh Approach – Test of proposed Strategic Air Command aircraft ground alert at Mountain Home Air Force Base in September 1957, intended to solve problems identified during Operations Try Out and Watch Tower.

=== G ===
- Gallant Hand – A large scale joint warfare training exercise held in 1972 at Fort Hood in which 23,000 soldiers and airmen participated.
- Gallant Journey 05 – Arkin write that this exercise was a "..Classified intelligence or special operations" activity held in March 2005, with DIA, NAS and CIA/OMA involvement.
- Gallant Knight – A command post exercise of the Rapid Deployment Force.
- Gallant Shield – Joint Chiefs of Staff directed and coordinated exercise.
- Gas House – 1956 communications exercise involving the Joint Chiefs of Staff and Atomic Energy Commission to test communications and procedures for releasing nuclear weapons to the military.
- Operation Game Warden – 1965 first major U.S. riverine patrol operation in the Vietnam War
- Operation Garden Plot – General US Army and US National Guard plan to respond to major domestic civil disorder within the United States
- Gate Keeper – a special access program which provides clandestine support associated with State Department Foreign Emergency Support Team missions and classified special operations and intelligence missions. Authority appears to rest in part with United States Special Operations Command. The 45-seat Boeing C-32B Gatekeeper flies transport missions under this program.
- Giant Dragon – Replaced Trojan Horse as the name for SAC U-2 operations in Southeast Asia on 1 July 1967. Became Giant Nail in July 1969.
- Giant Nail – Replaced Giant Dragon as name for U-2 operations in Southeast Asia in July 1969.
- Exercise Giant Pace – A series of "Simulated Electronic Launch-Minuteman" exercises to test launch on command of Minuteman missiles by launch control centers or the Airborne Launch Control System
- Giant Patriot – "Operational Base Launch Safety System" program of test flights of Minuteman II missiles. The system was internally mounted on the missile and permitted ground controllers to destroy the missile if it deviated from its programmed flight path. The program was terminated by Congress in July 1974
- Giant Plow – a United States Air Force Minuteman launcher closure test program
- Giant Profit – "Modified Operational Missile Test" of Minuteman missiles designed to test all Minuteman launch procedures except actual launch to ascertain the Minuteman launch reliability.
- Giant Scale – SR-71 reconnaissance missions over Southeast Asia 1969
- “Giant Voice” - SAC Deputy Commander Major General Clements M.

McMullen announced in May 1948 this competition, conducted for the express purpose of reinforcing training. That first event consisted of crews dropping three bombs visually and three by radar from an altitude of about 25,000 feet. Renamed Proud Shield in 1987.

- Gigantic Charge – Program to notify NORAD of all or part of Single Integrated Operational Plan (SIOP)^{[i]} targeting for Minuteman
- Gin Player – Strategic Air Command tests of Minuteman missile for identification and execution
- Global Guardian – An annual command-level exercise organized by United States Strategic Command in cooperation with Space Command and North American Aerospace Defense Command (NORAD). Underway during the September 11 terrorist attacks. Primary purpose is to test and validate nuclear command and control and execution procedures. Global Guardian is performed in conjunction with NORAD's Vigilant Guardian and Amalgam Warrior, as well as exercises sponsored by Air Combat Command (Crown Vigilance) and Space Command (Apollo Guardian).
- Glory Trip – United States Air Force Follow-on Test and Evaluation (FOT&E) program for intercontinental ballistic missiles. Included HGM-25A Titan I; LGM-25C Titan II; and LGM-30 Minuteman launches. Many launches from Vandenberg Launch Facility 2, Vandenberg Air Force Base.
- Glowing Heat – Deployment and redeployment of Lockheed SR-71 aircraft between Kadena Air Base and Beale Air Force Base
- Golden Dragon – A combined United States Navy-South Korea amphibious exercise in February 1973. The operation was held outside of Yang Po Ri island, South Korea.
- Operation Golden Pheasant – Emergency deployment of U.S. troops to Honduras in 1988, in response to Nicaraguan attacks on Contras logistics in Honduras
- Golden Spear – regional disaster management cooperation centre in Nairobi, Kenya, created initially with assistance from United States Central Command.
- Exercise Golden Thrust - U.S. Army exercise held primarily in the late 1980s, designed to test the readiness of Army National Guard, Reserve, and Individual Ready Reserve (IRR) units within United States First Army for mobilization.
- Gorgon Stare – Video capture technology. It is a spherical array of nine cameras attached to an unmanned aerial vehicle. The United States Air Force calls it "wide-area surveillance sensor system".
- Exercise Grand Slam – A major naval exercise of the North Atlantic Treaty Organization in the Mediterranean Sea in 1952; also the codename for Francis Gary Powers's U-2 mission over the Soviet Union, shot down on 1 May 1960.
- Granite Sentry – A NORAD Cheyenne Mountain nuclear bunker improvement program during the 1990s.
- Project Gray Wolf – U.S. Navy demonstration project in the 1990s that tested the AN/APG-76 multimode synthetic aperture radar on an S-3 Viking aircraft for real-time, stand-off surveillance and targeting support for fleet operations
- Green Python – RF-101 Voodoo detachment of Udorn Royal Thai Air Force Base
- Operation Guardian Retrieval – In 1997 United States European Command supervised the U.S. Army's Southern Europe Task Force (SETAF) and elements of two Marine Expeditionary Units to evacuate approximately 550 US citizens from Zaire during the First Congo War.

=== H ===
- Operation Hajji Baba – US Air Force operation from 25 to 29 August 1952 to airlift Hajj pilgrims stranded in Beirut, Lebanon to Jeddah, Saudi Arabia before the closing of the gates to Mecca.
- Exercise Hard Rock was a combined communications and civil defence UK exercise planned for September and October 1982. It assumed a conventional war in Europe lasting only two to three days, instead of the likely at-least-a-week, then a limited nuclear exchange.
- Harvest Falcon – Bare base equipment. "Harvest Falcon assets are tan in color and consist of housekeeping sets, an industrial operations set, and initial flight line and follow-on flight line sets. The housekeeping sets provide billeting with heating and cooling, a kitchen, showers, latrines, and high-voltage power generators for an 1100-person encampment."
- Harvest Moon – on 29 November 1957, shortly after the launch of Sputnik I on 4 October, two German expatriates, formed Project Space Track (originally called Project Harvest Moon). It was established in Building 1535 of the Geophysics Research Directorate, Air Force Cambridge Research Center, Laurence G. Hanscom Field, Massachusetts.
- Operation Hastings – U.S. and Army of the Republic of Vietnam (ARVN) counter-offensive operations in Quảng Trị
- Hasty Piper – Recruiting program using volunteers from technical training to return to their home towns to augment recruiting from July 1972 to February 1972.
- Have Blue – First nickname for Lockheed F-117 Nighthawk special access program development, later Senior Trend.
- Have Doughnut – Defense Intelligence Agency project to evaluate and exploit a Mikoyan-Gurevich MiG-21 "Fishbed-E" (YF-110) that the United States Air Force acquired in 1967 from Israel.
- Have Drill – Defense Intelligence Agency project whose purpose was to evaluate and test a Mikoyan-Gurevich MiG-17 (ASCC "Fresco") (YF-113A) fighter aircraft.
- Have Ferry – Defense Intelligence Agency project whose purpose was to evaluate and exploit a Mikoyan-Gurevich MiG-17 "Fresco-C" (YF-114C) fighter aircraft.
- Have Host – Tests during the 1970s of vulnerability of ICBM silos using high explosives to simulate nuclear attacks.
- Have Leap – A Space and Missile Test Center support of Minuteman-III program
- Have Privilege – Defense Intelligence Agency project whose purpose was to evaluate and exploit a Shenyang J-5 ("YF-113C") fighter aircraft.
- Have Quick – Electronic countermeasure (ECM)-resistant Frequency-hopping spread spectrum system used to protect military aeronautical mobile (OR) service radio traffic
- Have Rain – 2,000 pounds (910 kg) version of Popeye anti-ship missile developed by Rafael Advanced Defense Systems for deployment on P-3 Orion
- Have Siren – Counter infrared system for RC-135U/V/W aircraft.
- Have Sync – US Air Force program developing electronic counter-countermeasures (ECCM) SINCGARS capability replacing AN/ARC-186 airborne VHF radios for direct communications with ground forces, resulted in development of the AN/ARC-205 Have Sync radio. Program canceled in October 1989.
- Operation Hawkeye Strike – December 2025 U.S. military retaliatory strikes on ISIS forces in Syria in response to an attack on U.S. forces on December 13
- Project Heavenbound – Study of the use of nuclear weapons at high altitudes for air defense.
- Heavy Bare – Air Training Command training program to enable a fighter squadrons to deploy to a "bare base' under Coronet Bare.
- Heavy Chain – Follow on to Operation Heavy Hook using C-130Es of the 15th Special Operations Squadron
- Heavy Hook – Military Assistance Command Vietnam Airborne Studies Group First Flight Detachment, based at Nha Trang Air Base and operating specially modified C-123 Providers inserting and resupplying agents in Laos and North Viet Nam. Training was conducted by USAF personnel, but most missions were flown by Vietnamese and Chinese aviators. Later missions were flown by helicopters, including those flown by the 20th Special Operations Squadron in Thailand.
- High Bar – Strategic Air Command Operations Order 63-65, covering worldwide SAC drone operations
- Operation High Dive was a secret project carried out during the 1950s by the United States Air Force. It tested high-altitude parachutes using anthropomorphic dummies. The dummies went into a 200 rpm flat spin, which would be fatal to a human.
- High Flight – Search and rescue activities during the period 15 September 1997 – 17 October 1997 carried out from Windhoek, Namibia following the mid-air collision of a U.S. Lockheed C-141 Starlifter and a German Tupolev Tu-154 transport aircraft.
- Project High Jump – A 1962 series of record climb, speed, and altitude records with McDonnell Douglas F-4H Phantom II
- High Tide – Modification to Republic F-84 Thunderjets of the 136th Fighter-Bomber Wing to extend their range by equipping them for air refueling during the Korean War.
- Highland Warrior – 9th Reconnaissance Wing U-2 surveillance flights over Turkey and northern Iraq, flown from RAF Akrotiri, to relay information to Turkish authorities. These flights were the topic of acrimonious leaked diplomatic cables between British officials and the American embassy.
- Hilo Hattie – Experimental radio direction finding, photographic and infrared reconnaissance using a Sikorsky CH-54 helicopter
- Home Run – Persistent probing of Soviet air defenses, including a mass flight of six RB-47s over eastern Siberia.
- Operation Homecoming – Repatriation of U.S. prisoners of war from Vietnam in 1973
- Hula Hoop – code name concerned with the monitoring of French nuclear tests at Mururoa Atoll, French Polynesia, 1972 and 1973.

=== I ===
- Operation Igloo White – Electronic surveillance system on the Ho Chi Minh Trail
- Impala Rider – contingency planning to retain U.S. troops in Iraq after 2010.
- Operation Infinite Anvil - operation involving 22nd Marine Expeditionary Unit (Special Operations Capable (MEU) (SOC)) in the Horn of Africa, during deployment beginning August 2002.
- Infinite Moonlight – U.S.–Jordanian exercise, 1990s.
- Operation Infinite Reach – cruise missile strikes on al-Qaeda bases in Khost, Afghanistan, and the Al-Shifa pharmaceutical factory in Khartoum, Sudan, on August 20, 1998. Missiles launched by United States Navy
- Exercise Internal Look – one of U.S. Central Command's primary planning events from the 1980s onwards. It had frequently been used to train CENTCOM to be ready to defend the Zagros Mountains from a Soviet attack and was held annually.
- Exercise Inside Right - UK nuclear attack / civil defence exercise which took place in 1975.
- Instant Blunder - White House Military Office support to President Trump's quickly-preapred meetings with North Korean leaders.
- Operation Instant Thunder was the name given to air strike planning options by the United States Air Force in late 1990 during Operation Desert Shield. Designed by Colonel John A. Warden III, it was planned to be an overwhelming strike which would devastate the Iraq Armed Forces with minimum loss of civilian as well as American life. Name was chosen in reference to Rolling Thunder and the perceived failure of step by step escalation of air strikes on North Vietnam in the 1960s and 1970s. Instead the intention was a large, heavy blow instantly ("shock and awe").
- Iris Gold – On 3 October 1994, Company C, Second Battalion, 5th Special Forces Group (Airborne) was deployed on Iris Gold 95-1 for presences forward and pre-mission training with selected elements of the Kuwait Ministry of Defense (MOD). The training mission rapidly transitioned to defense of Kuwait operation establishing a Combat Air Support (CAS) umbrella, which became part of Operation Vigilant Warrior.
- Iron Clad – second designation for specially equipped Lockheed P-3 Orion long range maritime patrol aircraft, operated by VPU-1 and VPU-2 (Patrol Squadron, Special Projects), U.S. Navy.
- Operation Iron Hand – Suppression of Enemy Air Defenses missions in Southeast Asia, 1965–1973
- Island Thunder – U.S.-Italian "non-combatant evacuation exercise", 1996, 1997. Island Thunder 12 was a DOE NNSA-FBI sponsored weapons of mass destruction domestic crisis management table top exercise, part of the Silent Thunder series, held in Hawaii, 29 March 2012.
- Operation Ivory Coast – On 21 November 1970, a joint United States Air Force/United States Army force commanded by Air Force Brigadier General LeRoy J. Manor and Army Colonel Arthur D. "Bull" Simons landed 56 U.S. Army Special Forces soldiers by helicopter at the Sơn Tây prisoner-of-war camp located only 23 miles (37 km) west of Hanoi, North Vietnam. The raid was intended to free U.S. prisoners of war, but failed because the POWs had already been moved.
- Exercise Ivory Justice – deployment of Boeing KC-135 Stratotanker aircraft on exercise to United Arab Emirates in July 1990, activity affected by Iraqi invasion of Kuwait.
- Operation Ivy Bells – A joint United States Navy, Central Intelligence Agency, and National Security Agency mission whose objective was to place wire taps on Soviet underwater communication lines from 1971.

=== J ===
- Exercise Jack Frost (later known as Brim Frost) – exercise by U.S. forces in Alaska.
- Jagged Thorn – British exercise in Sudan, 1978, with 1st Battalion Grenadier Guards and elements Life Guards (Acorn, magazine of Life Guards, 1979).
- Operation Jet Black – Combat evaluation of the GAM-77 Hound Dog missile at Eglin Air Force Base in January 1963.
- Joint Anvil – unknown special operation, 1999-2001
- Operation Joint Endeavor – NATO operation to enforce the Treaty of Paris ending the war in Bosnia-Herzegovina. Began when the Allied Rapid Reaction Corps entered Bosnia on 20 December 1995.
- Operation Joint Forge – NATO support for SFOR 1998-c.2005
- Operation Joint Guard – NATO follow-on force to Joint Endeavor, SFOR, Bosnia-Herzegovina, 1996–1998
- Joint Guardian – NATO-led Kosovo Force
- Joint Spirit – NATO Combined Joint Task Force CPX/computer-aided exercise, planned as a building block for Strong Resolve, 1–30 September 2001. Cut short after the September 11, 2001, terrorist attacks.
- Operation Joint Venture
- Exercise Joint Winter – NATO exercise in Norway, 5–16 March 2001.
- Jolly Roger – UK national submarine exercise, 1995
- Jonah Able – During the Second Taiwan Strait Crisis. 12 F-104 Starfighters of the 83d Fighter-Interceptor Squadron were shipped to Taiwan, where they stood air defense alert until April 1959.
- Operation Ju-jitsu – 1951 program to lease four B-45 Tornado aircraft to Britain flying deep reconnaissance missions over the Soviet Union
- Jukebox Lotus – Operations in Libya after the attack on U.S. Consulate in Benghazi.
- Operation Jump Start –
- Operation Junction City – 1966 Vietnam War airborne operation in War Zone C, South Vietnam
- Exercise Judicious Response – U.S. Africa Command Chairman of the Joint Chiefs of Staff (CJCS)-directed warfighting Table Top Exercise (TTX). Judicious Response 15 included certification of 2nd Marine Expeditionary Brigade.
- Junction Rain – Maritime security operations in the Gulf of Guinea.
- Junction Serpent – Surveillance operations of ISIS forces near Sirte, Libya
- Jungle Jim – Code name for 4400th Combat Crew Training Squadron, later expanded to form the 1st Air Commando Wing
- Juniper – European Command/Israeli first word.
  - Juniper Cobra
  - Juniper Falconry – On 29 March 1992, Vice Admiral W. A. Owens, Commander, United States Sixth Fleet, embarked aboard USS Monterey (CG-61) with a 28-man Army, Navy, and Air Force staff including Brigadier General James Mathers (Commanding General, Provide Comfort) at Haifa for Exercise Juniper Falconry II. From 1–7 April, Monterey was underway for Juniper Falconry II, with a two-day port visit in Haifa on 3–4 April. From 7–9 April, Monterey visited Haifa again for exercise debriefs and to disembark the Joint Task Force.
  - Juniper Fox
- Jupiter Garrett – Joint Special Operations Command operation against high value targets in Somalia. Included Task Force 4–84 in 2011–2012.
  - Juniper Hawk
  - Juniper Micron – Airlift of French forces to combat Islamic extremists in Mali
  - Juniper Nimbus – Support for Nigerian Forces against Boko Haram
  - Operation Juniper Shield – Counterterrorism operations in the northwest African Sahara/Sahel. formerly known as Operation Enduring Freedom – Trans Sahara (OEF-TS); name change occurred 2012–13, though OEF-TS was still be used at times in 2014. Closely linked with 'Flintlock' exercise.
  - Juniper Stallion – see Command History, USS Cape St. George (CG-71) for the year 2000
- Operation Just Cause – 1989 invasion into Panama to oust Manuel Noriega. Also connected were "Exercise Purple Storm" and "Sand Flea."
- Operation Justice Reach
- Justified Seamount – Counter piracy operation off east African coast

=== K ===
- Exercise Keen Edge/Keen Sword – U.S./Japan defense of Japan exercise. Every two years, the US and Japan hold the Keen Sword exercise, the biggest military exercise around Japan. Japan, the United States and since 2024, Australia, participate, with Canada playing a smaller role.
- Key Hole – National Reconnaissance Office programs for GEOINT imagery intelligence
  - Key Hole-1 through Keyhole-4B – Corona satellites (1959–1972)
  - Key Hole-5 – Argon satellites (1961–1962)
  - Key Hole-6 – Lanyard satellites (1963)
  - Key Hole-7 – Gambit satellites (1963–1967)
  - Key Hole-8 – Gambit-3 satellites (1966–1984)
  - Key Hole-9 – Big Bird or Hexagon satellites (1971–1986)
  - Key Hole-10 – Dorian Manned Orbiting Laboratory (cancelled)
  - Key Hole-11 – Kennan (or Kennen), Crystal, Evolved Enhanced Crystal System, Improved Crystal, Ikon satellites (1976–2013)
- Keystone – Overall name for withdrawal of US forces from Vietnam (see also Banner)
  - Keystone Bluejay – (Increment III) Withdrawal of 50,000 troops by 15 April 1970. Movement of 16th Tactical Reconnaissance Squadron to Misawa Air Base and inactivation of 557th, 558th and 559th Tactical Fighter Squadrons.
  - Keystone Cardinal – (Increment II) Reduction of troop ceiling to 484,000 by 15 December 1969. Movement of U-10 and C-47 aircraft of 5th Special Operations Squadron to Korea.
  - Keystone Eagle – (Increment I) Reduction of troop ceiling to 534,500 in August 1969
  - Keystone Oriole Alpha – (Increment VII) Reduction of 100,000 by 1 December 1970
  - Keystone Robin Alpha – (Increments IV) reductions of 50,000 by 15 April 1971. 31st Tactical Fighter Wing moved to United States, 531st Tactical Fighter Squadron inactivated and planes returned to the United States, A-37s of the 8th and 90th Special Operations Squadrons turned over to the Vietnamese Air Force.
  - Keystone Robin Bravo – (Increment V) reductions of 40,000 by 15 April 1971. Return of 45th Tactical Reconnaissance Squadron planes to the United States.
  - Keystone Robin Charlie – (Increment VI) 3 reductions of 50,000/ 40,000/ 60,000 by 15 April 1971
- Operation Kingpin – Final clandestine phase of US Special Forces' Operation Ivory Coast rescue of United States prisoners of war during the Vietnam War
- Kodiak Hunter – Training of Kenyan forces for operations in Somalia

=== L ===
- Latent Arrow - one of the code names for a unit who carries out the U.S. Army's fixed-wing and rotary "covered air" mission, which involved moving personnel and materiel under civilian cover. Better known as SEASPRAY; now seemingly named Aviation Technology Office.
- Left Hook – Deployment of Long Arm RB-47H and Ryan 147D drones to the Philippines. The drones were to locate SA-2 surface to air missile sites, which would then be attacked by fighter aircraft. Two drone launches in August 1965 were both shot down by ground fire. The project was abandoned and resources rolled into United Effort.
- Lightning Bug – Big Safari program to modify Ryan BQM-34 Firebee target drones to Model 147 Firefly special purpose drones.
- Light Switch - a campaign to restore limited electrical power to major urban areas outside of Port-au-Prince and Cap Haitian after U.S. intervention in Haiti in 1994. See History of civil affairs in the United States Armed Forces.
- Limp Banana - sensitive White House Military Office emergency medical diagnosis activity, relating to very senior civilian staff, which began on January 19, 2025.
- Exercise Lion Protector '26 is the inaugural event in the Joint Expeditionary Force (JEF)'s new "Lion" exercise series. Running from 3 August to 12 October 2026, it includes convoy practice and protecting undersea data cables across the High North, North Atlantic, and Baltic Sea amid rising hybrid threats from Russia.
- Link Plumeria - special access program code name which includes funding for the Navy F/A-XX fighter project.
- Project Little Brother/Pave COIN - A USAF program evaluating counter insurgency aircraft during the early 1970s.
- Locked Shields - NATO COE CCD exercise, Tallinn.
- Lone Eagle – Design of longer range reconnaissance drone starting in 1966. Renamed Compass Arrow
- Long Arm – Project to fly Ryan 147 drones near SA-2 surface to air missile sites, transmitting ELINT to nearby Boeing RB-47H aircraft nearby, but out of range of the missiles. Planned for operation over Cuba in December 1962, but not deployed. Tested in 1965 with Ryan 147D drones. Deployed as Left Hook.
- Long Skip – Support for India in border dispute with China in Kashmir, 1962–1963
- Long Life – launch of LGM-30 Minuteman from 'live' launch facility with seven seconds of fuel.
- Exercise Long Look – long-established individual exchange program between Commonwealth armies. For example, Captain Katie Hildred, Queen Alexandra's Royal Army Nursing Corps, was dispatched on Exercise Long Look in New Zealand in 2017, a four-month program that was planned to see her deploy on various exercises and training packages with the New Zealand Army.
- Operation Looking Glass – U.S. Air Force Strategic Air Command (SAC) then U.S. Strategic Command survivable airborne command post. The name came from the aircraft's ability to "mirror" the command and control functions of the underground command post at SAC headquarters. Began 1961.
- Operation Louisville Slugger – 1971 RF-4C Phantom II reconnaissance north of the DMZ to locate North Vietnam Fan Song radar sites.
- Project Low Card – Use of U-2D aircraft to support the Missile Detection and Alarm System (MIDAS) satellite development by testing sensors to monitor exhaust plumes from missiles launched from Cape Canaveral for future use on satellites. Renamed Project Smokey Joe.
- Lucky Dragon – U-2E photographic reconnaissance missions flown from Clark Air Base, then from Bien Hoa Air Base over North Viet Nam, starting 14 February 1964. The missions provided intelligence for Military Assistance Command Vietnam and Pacific Command, and later included SIGINT. Renamed Trojan Horse in December 1964.
- Lucky – ARCENT firstword/call sign
  - Lucky Sentinel – ARCENT combined multi-national and joint service forces command post exercise to train/sustain battle staff in the Gulf region.
  - Lucky Strike – ARCENT exercise consisting of field training, battle staff readiness, fire team missions and crisis response for contingency command post preparation for rapid deployment
  - Lucky Warrior – Exercise testing ARCENT's capabilities to receive, interpret, disseminate, and respond to information using Army Battle Field Command System (ABCS) components proving Joint Task Force (JTF) headquarters' capability to lead.

=== M ===
- Operations Malheur I and Malheur II – Twin phased Search and destroy operations in Quảng Ngãi during the Vietnam War, 1967
- Operation Mango Ramp – "M" starting letter probably indicating Mogadishu - most known as initial airlift entry to Mogadishu for the African Union Mission in Somalia, 2007. In a larger sense, a United States Department of State (DOS) contract with the African Union Mission in Somalia worth $208m.
- Exercise Maple Flag – An annual air combat exercise carried out from CFB Cold Lake, Canada over the co-located Cold Lake Air Weapons Range (CLAWR).
- Operation Market Time – Joint (U.S. Navy and Coast Guard) and Combined (Australian and South Vietnamese Navies) operation to block transfer of arms into South Vietnam from North Vietnam by trawlers and other watercraft.
- Exercise Mavi Balina – Turkish anti-submarine exercise
- Max Thunder – joint military exercise between South Korea and the United States (2015–2018)
- Operation Menu – Covert bombing of North Vietnamese Army and Viet Cong base areas in eastern Cambodia by B-52s in 1969. Individual strikes were named Breakfast, Lunch, Dinner, Snack and Dessert
- Middle Gust – A U.S. Air Force test conducted at Crowley, CO involving a simulated nuclear overblast of a Minuteman missile silo
- Midnight Hammer - June 2025 Air Force and Navy strikes on Iranian nuclear sites
- Mighty Warrior 1988 - SAC wide exercise held to prepare and demonstrate the various SAC wings' ability to carry out their respective missions under austere conditions. In summer 1988, aircrew from both the 380th Air Refueling Squadron and the 310th Air Refueling Squadrons of the 380th Bombardment Wing deployed for the first time since World War II to Hunter Army Airfield, Georgia. For this deployment over 300 men and women deployed to the forward operating base.
- Millennium Challenge 2002 – United States military war game in 2002
- Misty Wind – Electronic intelligence missions flown by U.S. Air Force Boeing RC-135s are designated either Burning Wind or Misty Wind.
- Mongoose Hunter – Training of Somali forces (Danab Brigade) for operations against Al Shabab
- Operation Morning Light – Joint Canadian-US effort to recover Kosmos 954, a nuclear-powered Soviet RORSAT
- Operation Mount Hope III – retrieval of abandoned Libyan Mil Mi-25 attack helicopter from Wadi Doum in the Aozou Strip, Chad, 1988.
- Operation Mountain Resolve – launched by the United States and coalition allies on 7 November 2003 in the Nuristan province and Kunar province in Afghanistan. It involved an airdrop into the Hindu Kush mountains by the U.S. 10th Mountain Division and resulted in the killing of Hezbi commander Ghulam Sakhee, a few clashes, and the finding of some minor weapon caches.
- Mountain Shield I and II – rehearsal exercises for withdrawing UNPROFOR from the former Yugoslavia, 1990s. Mountain Shield I was held at Grafenwöhr, Germany, from 7–15 July 1995, by United States Army Europe.
- Operation Mountain Storm – Operation began on or about 12 March 2004, following the completion of Operation Mountain Blizzard. Part of spring fighting against Taliban in Afghanistan (Operation Enduring Freedom).
- Operation Mule Train – 1962 deployment of C-123 Provider aircraft to Clark Air Base and South Vietnam to provide airlift training and support for the VNAF

=== N ===
- Project Native Son – 1950s Air Force project to reduce costs by employing foreign nationals at overseas bases to replace military personnel.
- Exercise Natural Fire – East Africa
- Neon – U.S./Bahrain first word
  - Neon Response
  - Neon Spark – U.S./Bahrain naval exercise series, including the UK. Neon Spark 98.
- Neon Spear – Disaster response symposium with Eastern African countries
- Operation Neptune Spear – US Navy SEALs operation that killed Osama bin Laden
- New Normal – Development of rapid response capability in Africa
- New Tape – Airlift support for UN operations and humanitarian airlift in Republic of the Congo (Léopoldville) 1960–1964
- Nice Dog – code name concerned with the monitoring of French nuclear tests at Mururoa Atoll, French Polynesia, 1972 and 1973.
- Operation Nickel Grass 1973 – Support of Israel during the 1973 October War.
- Exercise Nifty Nugget – A 1978 transportation plans exercise, exposed great gaps in understanding between military and civilian participants: mobilization and deployment plans fell apart, and as a result, the United States and its NATO allies "lost the war". Estimated "400,000 troop 'casualties,' and thousands of tons of supplies and 200,000 to 500,000 trained combat troops would not have arrived at the identified conflict scene on time." "Two major recommendations came out of Nifty Nugget: a direct line of command between the transportation agencies and the Joint Chiefs of Staff; and the creation of an agency responsible for deployments. This agency was to be established as the Joint Deployment Agency, a forerunner to United States Transportation Command.
- Operation Nifty Package – A United States Delta Force and Navy SEAL-operated plan conducted in December 1989 designed to capture Panamanian leader Manuel Noriega. It unfolded as part of the wider Operation Just Cause. When Noriega took refuge in the Apostolic Nunciature of the Holy See (diplomatic quarter), deafening music and other psychological warfare tactics were used to convince him to exit and surrender himself.

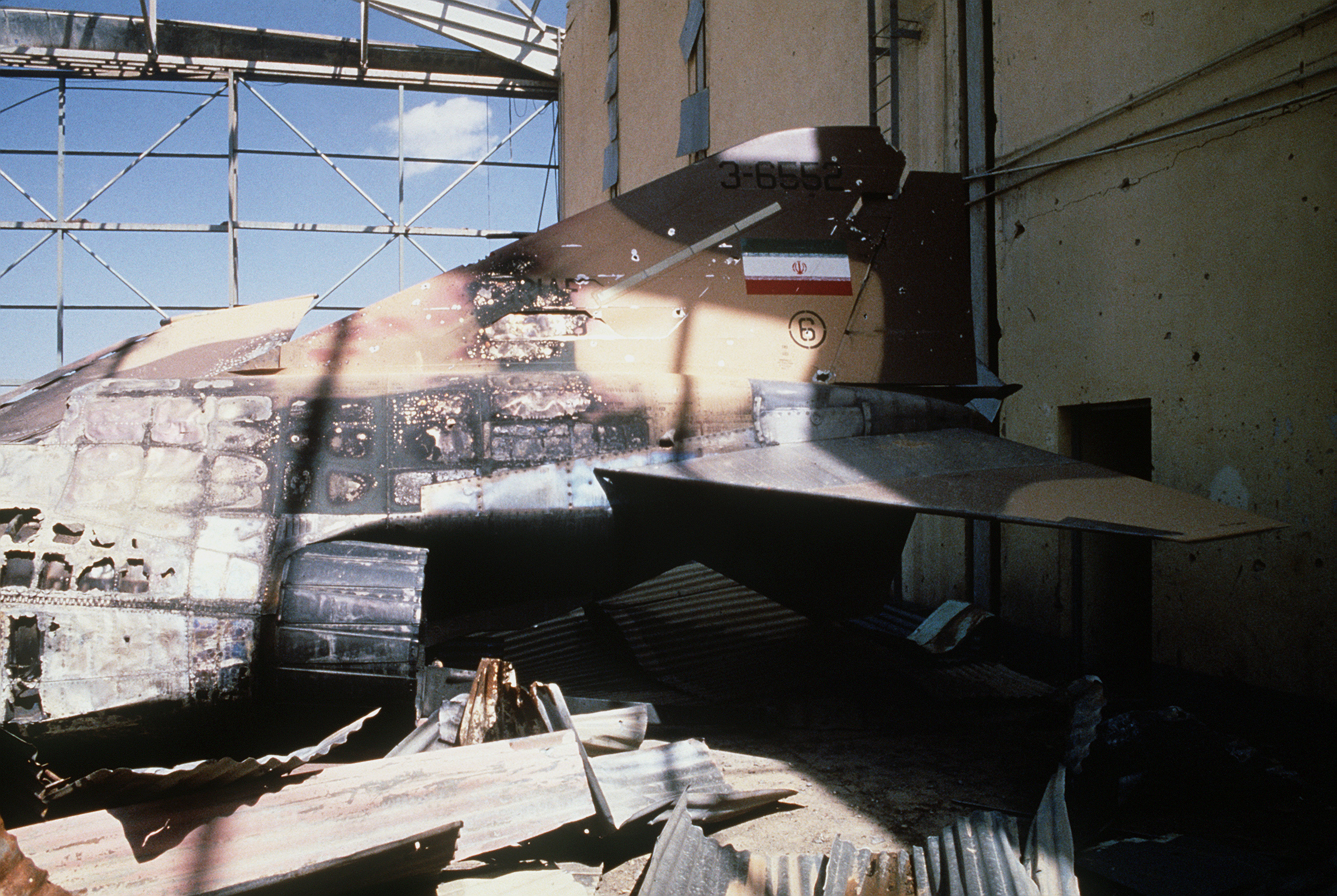
Wreck of abandoned ex-Iranian F-4E at Tallil Air Base, Iraq, 1991, investigated during Operation Night Harvest

- Operation Night Harvest – investigation of abandoned military aircraft in Iraq
- Night Owl – 8th Tactical Fighter Wing nighttime "fast FAC' operations over Laos
- Operation Night Reach – Transported Second United Nations Emergency Force (UNEF II) peacekeepers to Middle East at end of Yom Kippur War, 6–24 October 1973.
- Night Train – Part of a series of chemical and biological warfare tests overseen by the DOD Deseret Test Center as part of Project 112. The test was conducted near Fort Greely, Alaska from November 1963 to January 1964. The primary purpose of Night Train was to study the penetration of an arctic inversion by a biological aerosol cloud.
- Nimble Shield – Operation against Boko Haram and ISIL West Africa.
- Operation Nimbus Moon – Cleared the Suez Canal
- Operation Nimbus Stream – Cleared the Suez Canal
- Operation Nimbus Spar 1974–1975 – Cleared the Suez Canal
- Operation Nimrod Dancer – May 1989 airlift of US Army and Marine Corps elements to reinforce US forces in Panama.
- Operation Nine Iron – Strikes in El Salvador against the Farabundo Martí National Liberation Front by Lockheed AC-130 gunships in 1986. Mission aborted while strike aircraft were over target, and planes recalled.
- Joint Task Force Noble Anvil 1999 – Operation Allied Force, air war planning and execution against Serbia.
- Operation Noble Eagle – Air defense, mobilization of reserve forces after the September 11 terrorist attacks.
- Exercise Noble Jump (de:Noble Jump) – A NATO maneuver that took place in the summer of 2015 in Żagań, Poland. A second edition of the maneuver (Noble Jump II) took place in the summer of 2017 in Bulgaria and Romania. In May and June 2019 the exercise will take place again in Żagań, Poland.
- Operation Noble Response – U.S. delivery of over 900,000 kg of food after unseasonable rains and flooding in the northeastern part of Kenya, January–March 1998. Included formation of Joint Task Force Kenya, participation of 43rd Airlift Wing.
- Noble Resolve – a United States Joint Forces Command (USJFCOM) experimentation campaign plan to enhance homeland defense and improve military support to civil authorities in advance of and following natural and man-made disasters.
- Operation Noble Shirley - Echo Company of 2nd Battalion, 24th Marines operated in Israel conducting desert warfare and joint counter-terrorism training with the Israeli Defense Force in late 1996.
- Exercise Noble Suzanne – exercise with Israel in the first half of 2000, involving USS Dwight D. Eisenhower (CVN-69), USS Anzio, and USS Cape St. George (CG-71).
- Nomad Lightning - involves 33rd Fighter Wing
- Operation Nomad Shadow is the name of a classified military operation that may have begun in November 2007 to share intelligence information between the U.S. and the Republic of Turkey. Reportedly providing intelligence on Kurdish separatists along the Iraq-Turkey border. Appears to involve UAV patrols, potentially in connection with the Syrian Civil War.
- Operation Nomad Vigil – deployment to Gjadër Air Base, Albania of General Atomics MQ-1 Predator unmanned aerial vehicles, April 1995 – 1996.
- Operation Nordic Shield II was held in the summer of 1992. As they did five years before, units of the 94th Army Reserve Command, principally the 187th Infantry Brigade (Separate), the 167th Support Group (Corps) and their subordinate battalions and companies, deployed to Canadian Forces Base Gagetown in southern New Brunswick, to simulate the defense of Iceland against Warsaw Pact forces. Iceland defense was the CAPSTONE mission of both the 187th IB and 167th Support Group. Part of the 1992 exercise included lanes training as part of the United States Army Forces Command's "Bold Shift" initiative to reinforce unit war-fighting task proficiency.
- Operation Northern Delay occurred on 26 March 2003 as part of the 2003 invasion of Iraq. Paratroopers of the 173rd Airborne Brigade dropped into Northern Iraq. It is the largest airborne drop conducted by the U.S. Army in the 21st century.
- Exercise Northern Edge – exercise in Alaska
- Exercise Northern Entry – 1 New Zealand Special Air Service Group special forces training in Canada. Solely New Zealand exercise.
- Exercise Northern Light – 1 New Zealand Special Air Service Group extreme cold weather training in Norway.
- USS Arleigh Burke "set sail on 13 August 1996 for a seven week deployment to the North Sea and perhaps ARLEIGH BURKE'S greatest challenge of the year: Exercise NORTHERN LIGHT/BRIGHT HORIZON 96. Assigned as Force Air Defence Commander/Anti-Air Warfare Commander for a 17 ship NATO Task Force, which included Great Britain's aircraft carrier HMS Invincible, ARLEIGH BURKE managed air space that covered 650 miles, air defense for two geographically separated Task Groups, and coordinated 256 air sorties originating from both land and sea. NORTHERN LIGHT/BRIGHT HORIZON represented NATO's first attempt at establishing a Combined Joint Task Force and ARLEIGH BURKE and her crew were critical to the exercise's success. The ship's impressive execution during NORTHERN LIGHT/BRIGHT HORIZON resulted in message praise from both the Joint Task Force Commander (commander, Second Fleet) and CTF 401 (Commander, ASW Strike Fleet Atlantic." (sic: Commander, Striking Fleet Atlantic (COMSTKFLTLANT)).
- Exercise Northern Safari – Conducted on Great Barrier Island from 5–28 March (1983 or 1984). The aim was to mobilize the New Zealand Army Ready Reaction Force and practice selected elements in air/sea deployment and the conduct of operations. The exercise was supported by HMAS Tobruk, a company of the Gurkha Regiment from British Forces, Hong Kong which acted as the enemy for the exercise, and an Australian Army engineer squadron.
- Exercise Northern Strike – An annual readiness exercise hosted by the Michigan National Guard at Camp Grayling and Alpena Combat Readiness Training Center each August. Beginning in 2012, the exercise has grown to become the largest joint reserve component exercise in the United States.
- Operation Northern Watch – 1997–2003 enforcement of No Fly Zone over northern Iraq.
- Northern Wind 2019 – Swedish, Norwegian, Finnish main-defense style exercise being conducted on the Swedish/Finn border March 2019. Live exercise March 20–27. Fifteen hundred Finnish troops incorporated into Swedish 3rd Brigade; Norway to contribute the entirety of Brigade North including elements No. 339 Squadron RNoAF, a United States Marine Corps infantry battalion and a Royal Marines company group. Exercise area stretching from Boden, Sweden to Haparanda in Finland, and north to vicinity of Overtornea.

=== O ===
- Operation Oaken Sonnet
  - Oaken Sonnet I – 2013 rescue of United States personnel from South Sudan during its civil war
  - Oaken Sonnet II – 2014 operation in South Sudan
  - Oaken Sonnet III – 2016 operation in South Sudan
- Oaken Steel – July 2016 to January 2017 deployment to Uganda and reinforcement of security forces at US embassy in South Sudan.
- Objective Voice – Information operations and psychological warfare in Africa
- Oblique Pillar – private contractor helicopter support to U.S. Navy SEAL-advised units of the Somali National Army fighting al-Shabaab in Somalia. The operation was in existence as of February 2018. Bases used included Camp Lemonnier, Djibouti; Mombasa and Wajir, Kenya; Baidoa, Baledogle, Kismayo and Mogadishu, Somalia; Entebbe, Uganda.
- Old Fox – Minuteman III flight tests by the United States Air Force
- Operation Observant Compass – initially attempts to kill Joseph Kony and eradicate the Lord's Liberation Army. In 2017, with around $780 million spent on the operation, and Kony still in the field, the United States wound down Observant Compass and shifted its forces elsewhere. But the operation did not completely disband, according to the Defense Department: “forces supporting Operation Observant Compass transitioned to broader.. security and stability activities that continue the success of our African partners."
- Obsidian Lotus – Training Libyan special operations units
- Obsidian Mosaic – Operation in Mali.
- Obsidian Nomad I – Counterterrorism operation in Diffa, Niger
- Obsidian Nomad II – Counterterrorism operation in Arlit, Niger
- Octave Anchor – Psychological warfare operations focused on Somalia.
- Octave Fusion - Navy SEAL-led operation in Somalia that rescued an American and a Danish hostage on January 24, 2012.
- Octave Shield – operation by Combined Joint Task Force – Horn of Africa.
- Octave Soundstage – Psychological warfare operations focused on Somalia.
- Octave Stingray – Psychological warfare operations focused on Somalia.
- Octave Summit – Psychological warfare operations focused on Somalia.
- Operation Odyssey Dawn – air campaign against Libya, 2011.
- Odyssey Lightning – Airstrikes on Sirte, Libya. It was launched on August 1, 2016, to support the Libyan Government of National Accord (GNA) in expelling the Islamic State (ISIS) from Sirte. The operation involved 495 airstrikes and concluded in December 2016 after the GNA announced the removal of the last IS opposition from Sirte, though U.S. operations against ISIS continued elsewhere in Libya.
- Odyssey Resolve – Intelligence, Surveillance and Reconnaissance operations in area of Sirte, Libya.
- Oil Burner – Strategic Air Command low level bomber training. Replaced by Olive Branch.
- Old Bar – Telemetry checks of the Ryan 147G flown with EB-47H October to November 1966 from Bien Hoa Air Base, South Vietnam. Operational missions against SA-2 sites may have also been flown.
- Olive Branch – Strategic Air Command low level bomber training. Replaced Oil Burner. Name later dropped and training areas called Instrument Routes or Visual Routes. Appears to have been reused 1993–94 to describe U-2 reconnaissance missions over Iraq.
- Olive Farm - Parsch writes that this is a U-2 contingency operation. GS.org says it may have been Middle East in the 1970s.
- Olympic Defender – "U.S. space war plan", to be first shared with unspecified allies after a new version of the plan was promulgated in December 2018.
- Olympic Arena III – Strategic Air Command missile competition of all nine operational missile units
- Olympic Event – A Minuteman III nuclear operational systems test
- Olympic Fire - U-2 reconnaissance over Cuba, later "R" models from Patrick AFB, FL.
- Olympic Flame, Olympic Flare – associated with 9th Strategic Reconnaissance Wing Lockheed U-2 operations.
- Olympic Game - U-2 reconnaissance on North Korea, 1990s
- Operation Olympic Games - cyberattacks against Iran
- Olympic Harvest - U-2R reconnaissance from Akrotiri
- Olympic Play – A Strategic Air Command missiles and operational ground equipment program for EWO missions
- Olympic Torch – U-2R COMINT system in Southeast Asia, renamed from Senior Book on 11 April 1972.
- Olympic Trials – A program to represent a series of launches having common objectives
- During 1985 and 1986, in Operation "Onaway Eagle", the 76th Infantry Division successfully defined, established and executed the first United States Army Reserve mobilization army training center at Fort Campbell, Kentucky which became the model for utilization and employment of other Army reserve training divisions. During Operation Onaway Eagle, elements of the division successfully conducted Basic Combat Training for hundreds of new soldiers.
- Project One Side – Operational test and evaluation of AN/ARC-65 airborne HF Single-sideband (SSB) radio
- Exercise Open Gate – NATO air/naval exercise in the Mediterranean, late 1970s. 1979 iteration included No. 12 Squadron RAF deployment from Honington to RAF Gibraltar, carrying out the low-level anti-shipping mission.
- Open Spirit, Open Road - NATO Partnership for Peace (PfP) seminar Norfolk, VA;, In the Spirit of (ISO) PfP Mine Countermeasures (MCM) exercise and symposium.
- Orient Express - U.S. efforts to deny UN Secretary-General Boutros Boutros-Ghali reelection
- Exercise Orient Shield – United States Army/JGSDF annual exercise
- Operation Ortsac – US military plan and mock invasion exercise on Vieques to overthrow a ficitious leader called "Ortsac" ("Castro" backwards) in August 1962.

=== P ===
- Pacer Bravo – Project to furnish the Vietnamese Air Force with trainers and training aids for maintenance courses.
- Pacer Classic – 1985 program to upgrade Northrop T-38 trainer airframes and engines.
- Pacer Coin – Nevada Air National Guard 152nd Airlift Wing C-130E Hercules day/night, all-weather reconnaissance/surveillance roll-on/roll-off palletized F-4 camera system providing imagery intelligence (IMINT) support to theater and other commanders
- Pacer CRAG – Late 1990s Air Force program providing avionic update/overhaul of C-135 and KC-135R aircraft including glass cockpit, enabling elimination of navigators from crew, where CRAG is an acronym for "Compass, Radar And GPS."
- Pacer Day – Modification of ten C-135Bs to WC-135B weather reconnaissance and atmospheric sampling aircraft by Hayes Industries in 1965.
- Pacer Forge – Exercise conducted during USAF basic training simulating operation from small, dispersed locations. Named for Primary Agile Combat Employment Range, Forward Operations Readiness Generation Exercise
- Operation Pacer Goose – annual resupply of Thule Air Base, Greenland, by a heavy supply ship each summer. MV American Tern (T-AK-4729) made the trip in 2010.
- Pacer Galaxy – Element of Minuteman force modification program
- PACEX (Pacific Exercise) – United States Pacific Fleet exercise series. PACEX '89 was the biggest peacetime exercise since the end of World War II. It was designed by Seventh Fleet "to determine the ability of US and allied naval forces to sustain high tempo combat operations for an extended period." Three aircraft carrier battle groups, and two different battleship battle groups, gathered off the U.S. West Coast, proceeded through the Gulf of Alaska and the Pacific Ocean to Japan, and merged to conducted Battle Force operations against "opposing" USAF and JASDF and Navy as ANNUALEX 01G. USS Antietam (CG-54) served as the "..Anti-Air Warfare Coordinator for her successive battle groups and as alternate AAWC for the entire Battle Force. Steaming into the Sea of Japan, Antietam was also the AAWC for the Amphibious Task Force as they made their assault on the South Korean beach as Exercise VALIANT BLITZ 90." Test of maritime strategy. See also Lehman, John (May 2018). Oceans Ventured: Winning the Cold War at Sea. W. W. Norton & Company. Also PACEX 02.
- Pacific Bond – U.S.-Australian army reserve exchange
- Pacific Castle – Pacific naval exercise
- Pacific Haven – emergency evacuation of pro-U.S. Kurds to Andersen Air Force Base, Guam, September 1996-April 1997.
- Pacific Horizon – WMD exercise
- Pacific Kukri – UK–NZ exercise, 2000–2001
- Pacific Look – U.S.–Australian army reserve exchange, 1997
- Pacific Nightingale – Pacific Air Forces exercise, South Korea
- Exercise Pacific Partnership – Annual deployment of United States Pacific Fleet elements in cooperation with refional governments and military.
- Pacific Protector – Proliferation Security Initiative exercise involving Japanese-flagged merchant ship simulating carrying WMD.
- Pacific Reserve
- Pacific Spectrum
- Pacific Warrior – SPAWAR telemedicine exercise connected to South Korea
- Pacific Wind
- Palace Lightning – USAF withdrawal of its aircraft and personnel from Thailand.
- Paladin Hunter – Counterterrorism operation in Puntland, probably referring to U.S. support for Puntland Security Force
- Patricia Lynn – RB-57E Canberra reconnaissance missions in Southeast Asia, starting 1963–1970, primarily using infrared sensors
- PAVE – USAF first word relating to electronic systems
  - Pave Aegis – Refit of AC-130 gunships with a 105mm cannon
  - Pave Arrow – Development of AN/AVQ-14 laser tracking pod for use with AN/AVQ-12 Pave Spot laser designator on C-123K Provider and O-2A Skymaster forward air control aircraft
  - Pave Buff – Pathfinder bombing operation using two LORAN-C/D AN/ARN-92 receiver equipped B-52D Stratofortress bombers to lead a three-aircraft cell of B-52s to a target in Southeast Asia during the Vietnam War
  - Pave COIN/Project Little Brother - A USAF program evaluating counter insurgency aircraft during the early 1970s.
  - Pave Cricket – Boeing CEM-138 electronic countermeasures mini drone, a CQM-121A Pave Tiger equipped with a jamming system. Program cancelled.
  - Pave Eagle – Modified Beechcraft Bonanza drone aircraft for low altitude sensor monitoring.
  - Pave Fire – Targeting system for "dumb bomb" delivery installed on a single F-4D Phantom II during the Vietnam War
  - Pave Gat – Program to develop a laser rangefinder for the B-52G Stratofortress
  - Pave Hawk – Sikorsky HH-60 special operations and combat search and rescue helicopter.
  - Pave Knife – Ford Aerospace AN/AVQ-10 early laser targeting pod.
  - Pave Lance – Program to replace the Pave Knife AN/AVQ-10 by adding forward looking infrared (FLIR) capability in place of low light level television (LLLTV), but Pave Tack development of AN/AVQ-26 took priority
  - Pave Light – Development of a stabilized laser designator, the AN/AVQ-9, for F-4 Phantom II aircraft
  - Pave Low – Sikorsky MH-53 special ops and combat search and rescue helicopter.
  - Pave Mack – Laser seeker head development program for air-to-surface missiles, also referred to as LARS (Laser Aided Rocket System) for use with the AN/AVQ-12 Pave Spot laser designator
  - Pave Mint – Upgrade of the AN/ALQ-117 electronic warfare system to the AN/ALQ-172.
  - Pave Mover – Demonstration program to develop the AN/APY-7 radar wide-area surveillance, ground moving target indicator (GMTI), fixed target indicator (FTI) target classification, and synthetic aperture radar (SAR) for the E-8 Joint STARS.
  - Pave Nail – AN/AVQ-13 stabilized periscopic laser designator aboard North American Rockwell OV-10 Bronco with AN/AVQ-12 Pave Spot target laser designator pod.
  - Pave Onyx – Vietnam era Advanced Location Strike System c.1973.
  - Pave Pace – A fully integrated avionics architecture featuring functional resource allocation.
  - Pave Paws – The Phased-Array Warning System which replaced the three BMEWS radars. Pave in this case is a backronym for Perimeter or Precision Acquisition Vehicle Entry.
  - Pave Penny – Lockheed-Martin AN/AAS-35(V) laser spot tracker.
  - Pave Pepper – An Air Force Space and Missile Systems Organization project to decrease the size of the Minuteman III warheads allowing more to be launched by one missile.
  - Pave Phantom – Long Range Navigation (LORAN-D) AN/ARN-92 and computer added to F-4D Phantom II storing information for 8 different targets designated by the OV-10 Bronco with the Pave Nail AN/AVQ-13 designator
  - Pave Pillar – Generic core avionics architecture system for combat aircraft.
  - Pave Pointer – C-123K Provider palletized laser designator/rangefinder/low light level television system used as a Gun Direction Platform
  - Pave Prism – Infrared and active laser seekers development for use on the AIM-132 air-to-air missile
  - Pave Pronto – Lockheed AC-130 Spectre gunship program adding a night observation camera, AN/AAD-4 or AN/AAD-6 FLIR, and AN/AVQ-17 illuminator.
  - Pave Scope – Development of target acquisition aids like TISEO and the Honeywell AN/AVG-8 Eagle Eye Visual Target Acquisition Set (VTAS) helmet sighting system
  - Pave Spectre – Lockheed AC-130E Spectre gunships
  - Pave Spot – AN/AVQ-12 stabilized periscopic night vision sight laser designator pod developed for use on the O-2A Skymaster
  - Pave Spike – Westinghouse AN/ASQ-153, AN/AVQ-23 electro-optical laser designator pod.
  - Pave Sword – AN/AVQ-11 laser tracker for F-4 Phantom II aircraft.
  - Pave Tack – Ford Aerospace AN/AVQ-26 electro-optical targeting pod, first used on F-4 Phantom II and later on F-111F Aardvark aircraft.
  - Pave Tiger – Boeing designed drone (CQM-121A) for Suppression of Enemy Air Defenses. CGM-121B was code named Seek Spinner.
  - Pave Way – Project to develop a series of laser-guided bombs developed by Texas Instruments
- PANAMAX – exercise to defend the Panama Canal. Held 2005 and in 2006, under the leadership of Commander, United States Naval Forces Southern Command.
- Peace Atlas II
- Peace Crown – air defense automation study for Imperial Iranian Air Force (Foreign Military Sales), effective 3 August 1972, LGFX.
- Peace Echo – Training of Israeli Air Force aircrew and maintenance personnel on the McDonnell F-4E Phantom II.
- Peace Edge – Delivery of F-5s.
- Peace Eternal (plus Peace Eternal II and III) – Delivery of Northrop F-5s to Thailand, including F-5E/Fs.
- Peace Fortress – delivery of AN/TPS-43E radars to Sudan, effective date 25 January 1978.
- Peace Hawk – Foreign Military Sales case for Northrop F-5B/E aircraft, effective date 8 September 1971, USAF implementing organization SMS/AC. Recipient was Saudi Arabia (source Parsch).
- Peace Hercules – Foreign Military Sales of Lockheed C-130H aircraft for the Congo, effective date 11 September 1973, implementing organization SMSAC.
- Peace Icarus – Foreign Military Sales of McDonnell Douglas F-4E aircraft for Greece, effective date 3 April 1972, USAF implementing organization LGFXR.
- Peace Inca – Northrop F-5s for Peru, effective date 8 February 1973, LGFXR.
- Peace Start – Later name for Peace Hawk.
- Persian Rug - demonstrating the capabilities of the Boeing B-52 Stratofortress, on 10–11 January 1962 a B-52H from the 4136th Strategic Wing at Minot Air Force Base set a new world distance record, flying unrelieved 12,532 miles (20,168 km) from Kadena AB, Okinawa to Torrejon AB, Spain.
- Operation Pegasus – Resupply and relief operations to U.S. Marines besieged at Khe Sanh, South Vietnam
- Phoenix Banner – "Special Air Mission", air transportation of the president of the United States, aircraft usually codenamed Air Force One. The basic procedures for such flights are stipulated in Air Force Instruction #11-289.
- Phoenix Duke I and II – involved NATO efforts to resettle ethnic Albanians into a secure environment as part of the peace agreement with Serbia, 1999, with participation of 433rd Airlift Wing.
- Phoenix Copper – flights flown in support of the Secret Service for VIPs other than the president and vice president.
- Operation Phoenix Jackal – Support for Saudi Arabian and Kuwait against Iraq in 1994
- Phoenix Oak – See Coronet Oak. Operation name when directed by Air Combat Command 1992–?
- Phoenix Raven – Program involves specially trained United States Air Force Security Forces airmen flying with and protecting Air Mobility Command aircraft around the world, in areas where there is "inadequate security."
- Operations Phoenix Scorpion I & II 1997–1998, also phases III and IV – Deployment of additional troops and equipment to Kuwait, Saudi Arabia, and the Middle East during 'Desert Thunder' confrontation with Iraq. In 1998 the 433rd Airlift Wing participated in Phoenix Scorpions I – III. Phoenix Scorpion IV involved David Grant USAF Medical Center.
- Phoenix Silver – Special Air Mission flight involving the Vice President of the United States.
- Project Phyllis Ann – Deployment of Douglas RC-47 Skytrain aircraft equipped with AN/ARD-18 airborne radio direction finding equipment to locate enemy units. Renamed Project Compass Dart in Spring 1967
- Operation Pierce Arrow – US Navy retaliatory strike on 5 August 1964 following the Gulf of Tonkin incident
- Pie Face – Boeing C-97G Stratofreighter equipped with photographic reconnaissance ewuipment
- Pipe Stem – 1961 US Air Force RF-101C Voodoo reconnaissance aircraft at Tan Son Nhut Airport conducting top secret flights over Southeast Asia confirming communist activity in South Vietnam and Laos
- Exercise Pitch Black – air exercise held in northern Australia
- Pock Mark (USNS Wheeling) – code name concerned with the monitoring of French nuclear tests at Mururoa Atoll, French Polynesia, 1972 and 1973.
- Polo Hat – nuclear command and control exercise
- Polo Step – Classified as Top Secret, Polo Step was a United States Department of Defense code name or ‘compartment’ that was initially created in the late 1990s to designate closely held planning information on covert operations against Al Qaeda in Afghanistan. A person could have a Top Secret clearance, but if they would not have a need to know about the planning as well, they did not have a ‘Polo Step’ authorization. Following the September 11, 2001 attacks, ‘Polo Step’ started to be used by United States Central Command to be the planning compartment for the 2003 invasion of Iraq.
- Operation Pocket Money – Mining of Haiphong harbor starting in May 1972.
- Poseidon Archer - series of cruise missile and airstrikes, against the Houthi movement in Yemen in response to Houthi attacks on ships in the Red Sea, since January 2024.
- Operation Pony Express – was the covert transportation of, and the provision of aerial support for, indigenous soldiers and material operating across the Laotian and North Vietnamese borders during the Vietnam War.
- Project Popeye (later Operation Popeye) – 1966–1972 weather modification in Southeast Asia to extend and intensify the monsoon season to make passage on the Ho Chi Minh Trail more difficult. Project Popeye was the 1966 test; Operation Popeye was the 1967–1972 operation.
- Exercise Port Call 86 – A Joint Chiefs of Staff sponsored command post exercise carried out 12–22 November 1985 (CENTCOM Command History 1985 via BIG-IP logout page, p. 100).
- Pot Luck – code name concerned with the monitoring of French nuclear tests at Mururoa Atoll, French Polynesia, 1972 and 1973.
- Operation Power Flite – a United States Air Force mission in which three Boeing B-52 Stratofortresses became the first jet aircraft to circle the world nonstop, when they made the journey in January 1957 in 45 hours and 19 minutes, using in-flight refueling to stay aloft. The mission was intended to demonstrate that the United States had the ability to drop a hydrogen bomb anywhere in the world.
- Operation Power Geyser – Military security support to the 2005 Presidential inauguration
- Power House – 1956 Elint missions by EB-47s from Thule Air Base.
- Operation Power Pack – Intervention in the Dominican Republic following 1965 military coup.
- Operation Prairie Fire – 1986 strikes on Libya
- Operation Prairie Fire – Clandestine operation in Laos by the Studies and Observation Group for strike control and bomb damage assessment. Renamed from Operation Dewey Canyon
- Prayer Book – Gradual buildup of US forces in Panama Canal Zone during 1989, preliminary to Operation Just Cause.
- Operation Prime Chance – special operations forces operating off U.S. Navy vessels in the Persian Gulf, mid-1980s.
- Operation Prize Bull – September 1971 strikes against North Vietnamese POL storage sites
- Project Prize Crew – Development and deployment of quiet night observation powered glider QT-2PC (Quiet Thruster 2 Prize Crew), later developed as the Lockheed YO-3 Quiet Star
- Promise Kept – International Committee of the Red Cross facilitated visit to the crash site of Scott Speicher, Iraq, 1995.
- Operation Proud Bunch – Plan to strike hard logistics sites in North Vietnam within 35 miles of the DMZ. Combined with Operation Fracture Deep as Operation Proud Deep.
- Operation Proud Deep – Combined Operation Fracture Deep and Operation Proud Bunch to strike Vietnam People's Air Force bases and logistics sites south of 18th parallel.
- Operation Proud Deep Alpha – Extension of Operation Proud Deep to targets south of 20th parallel.
- Proud Phantom – unprogrammed tactical deployment ordered by Secretary of Defense/JCS, not part of the regular exercise program, in which 12 F-4E Phantom IIs and at least 400 personnel were dispatched to Cairo West Air Base, Egypt, during FY 80.
- Proud Shield - (i) SAC Bombing and Navigation Competition. (ii) Second phase of Somalia intervention in the early 1990s after Restore Hope.
- Proven Force – Northern air campaign from Turkey over Iraq in 1991. General Jamerson activated JTF Proven Force at Ramstein Air Base, Germany. The task force had three component organizations: Commander Air Force Forces (later to be mostly the 7440th Composite Wing (Prov)), Commander Army Forces, and Commander Joint Special Operations Task Force, which would seek and rescue downed allied pilots.
- Provide – EUCOM humanitarian assistance operations first word
  - Provide Assistance
  - Operation Provide Comfort – Provide Comfort II – Kurdish security zone in northern Iraq, 1991.
  - Provide Hope I/II/III/IV/V – Airlift of humanitarian relief to Commonwealth of Independent States
  - Provide Promise – Airlift of humanitarian relief to Bosnia Herzegovina
  - Provide Refuge
  - Operation Provide Relief – 1992 humanitarian relief missions to Somalia. See Operation Restore Hope.
  - Provide Transition
- Purple – British joint exercise prefix
  - Purple Dragon – joint forced entry operations. Purple Dragon 00/Roving Sands 00, Fort Bragg and Puerto Rico; Purple Dragon 98/JTFEX 98–1, Fort Bragg and Puerto Rico, Jan-Feb. 1998.
  - Exercise Purple Star/Royal Dragon – held in April–May 1996, the exercise brought together the XVIII Airborne Corps and the 82nd Airborne Division (both from the United States), 5th Airborne Brigade (British Army), the U.S. Air Force, the Royal Air Force, the U.S. Marines, 3 Commando Brigade Royal Marines and the Royal Navy. It saw the deployment of 5th Airborne Brigade to North Carolina in the largest Anglo-American exercise for twenty-three years. Relieved from the back-to-back commitment of aircraft carriers to the Adriatic in support of UNPROFOR, the Royal Navy sent a large force, headed by a Carrier Task Group with HMS Invincible flying the flag of Rear Admiral Alan West, Commander UK Task Group; HMS Fearless and an amphibious group; and an MCM group headed by HMS Hecla. U.S. Atlantic Command, headquartered at Norfolk, Virginia, directed the exercise. The aim of the operation was to practise a joint UK force in combined manoeuver in an overseas theatre. The exercise provided the first opportunity to test the new UK Permanent Joint Headquarters, which provided the core of the British Joint Headquarters in support of the exercise Joint Commander. The exercise also was designed to test the new UK Joint Rapid Deployment Force which was established on 1 August 1996. A description of 1st Brigade, 82nd Airborne Division's experience during Royal Dragon can be found in Tom Clancy, Airborne: A Guided Tour of an Airborne Task Force, Berkley Books, New York, 1997, 222–228.
  - Purple Guardian – U.S. homeland defense exercise
  - Purple Horizon – Cyprus, 2005.
  - Purple Solace – 4-6 Jun 2013 Three officers from the Combined Joint Operations from the Sea Center of Excellence (CJOS COE) supported the U.S. Joint Forces Staff College's Exercise “Purple Solace” as mentors. This exercise is a 3-day faculty guided planning exercise which reinforces the initial steps necessary to derive a mission statement and a commander's intent (end state) and a limited Concept of Operations in response to a series of natural disasters.
  - Exercise Purple Sound – A high level computer assisted exercise designed to support the training of the Command and Staff of the Permanent Joint Headquarters which deploys and commands the Joint Rapid Deployment Force.
  - Exercise Purple Storm – a series of United States Southern Command, or United States Army South, exercises in Panama in 1989 that aimed to both assert United States treaty rights and to conduct tactical rehearsals for Operation Just Cause. These exercises were carried out, according to the Department of Defense, to protect the integrity of the Torrijos-Carter Treaties of 1977. Purple Storm was part of the Prayer Book series of plans created as relations between Panama and the US deteriorated. (CMH 55–5–1)
  - Exercise Purple Warrior

=== Q ===
- Quick Fox – Electronic intelligence missions flown from MacDill Air Force Base, Florida near Cuba by C-130s under Strategic Air Command control until November 1962, then transferred to Tactical Air Command.
- Operation Quick Lift 1995 – Support of NATO Rapid Reaction Force and Croatia forces deployment to Bosnia-Herzegovina.
- Quick Shot – training activity by 49th Air Division while in United Kingdom, period 1952–56. Other training missions included Kingpin and Bear Claw.

=== R ===
- Rainmaker – Turse and Naylor write that this United States Africa Command codename refers to "A highly sensitive classified signals intelligence effort. Bases used: Chebelley, Djibouti; Baidoa, Baledogle, Kismayo and Mogadishu, Somalia."
- Operation Ranch Hand – UC-123 Defoliation and crop destruction missions in Vietnam and Laos
- Rapid Trident – Exercise Rapid Trident '14, held in Lviv, Ukraine, near the border with Poland was to “promote regional stability and security, strengthen partnership capacity, and foster trust while improving interoperability between USAREUR, the land forces of Ukraine, and other (NATO and partner) nations,” according to the USAREUR website.
- Operation Ready Swap – Use of reserve units to transport aircraft engines between Air Materiel Command's depots.
- Exercise Real Thaw – an annual exercise run by the Portuguese Air Force with the participation of the Army and Navy and foreign military forces. The exercise has the objective of creating a realistic as possible operational environment in which Portuguese forces might participate, provide joint training with both land, air and naval forces, and provide interoperability between different countries.
- Reaper Smoke – Annual competition among General Atomics MQ-9 Reaper units,
- Operation Red Hat – publicly acknowledged part of this operation involved relocation of chemical and biological weapons stored in Okinawa to Johnston Atoll for destruction. Most of the operation took place at night, to avoid observation of the operation by the Okinawans, who resented the presence of chemical munitions on the island. The chemical weapons consisted of rockets, mines, artillery projectiles, and bulk 1-ton containers filled with Sarin, Agent VX, vomiting agent, and blister agent such as mustard gas. There are indications that the codename was also used to designate storage and/or testing of chemical and biological agents on Okinawa in the 1960s, connected with Project 112.
- Project Red Richard – 1959 relocation of nuclear weapons from France following an ultimatum from French president Charles de Gaulle.
- Project Red Wagon – 1960 National Reconnaissance Office project to develop an unmanned reconnaissance vehicle. Cancelled and funds diverted to development of the A-12 Blackbird.
- Reef Point – first designation for specially equipped Lockheed P-3 Orion long range maritime patrol aircraft, operated by VPU-1 and VPU-2 (Patrol Squadron, Special Projects), U.S. Navy.
- Exercise Reforger – Return of Forces to Germany (Cold War).
- Joint Task Force Resolute Response (1998) – United States Central Command response to U.S. embassy bombings in Kenya.
- Operation Resolute Support – NATO non-combat advisory and training mission to support the Government of the Islamic Republic of Afghanistan from 2015 onwards.
- Operation Restore Hope – U.S. participation in UNOSOM II, 1992–1994, Somalian humanitarian aid and security efforts.
- Resultant Fury – DoD activity in November 2004 which included the weapons testing of free-fall bombs against decommissioned USN vessels off Hawaii.
- Operation Riders Up – Movement of Strategic Air Command units from their Florida bases (Homestead, McCoy, MacDill) to make room for forward based Tactical Air Command units during the Cuban Missile Crisis.
- Exercise RIMPAC – Rim of the Pacific Exercise, large-scale U.S. Pacific Fleet activity with allied involvement.

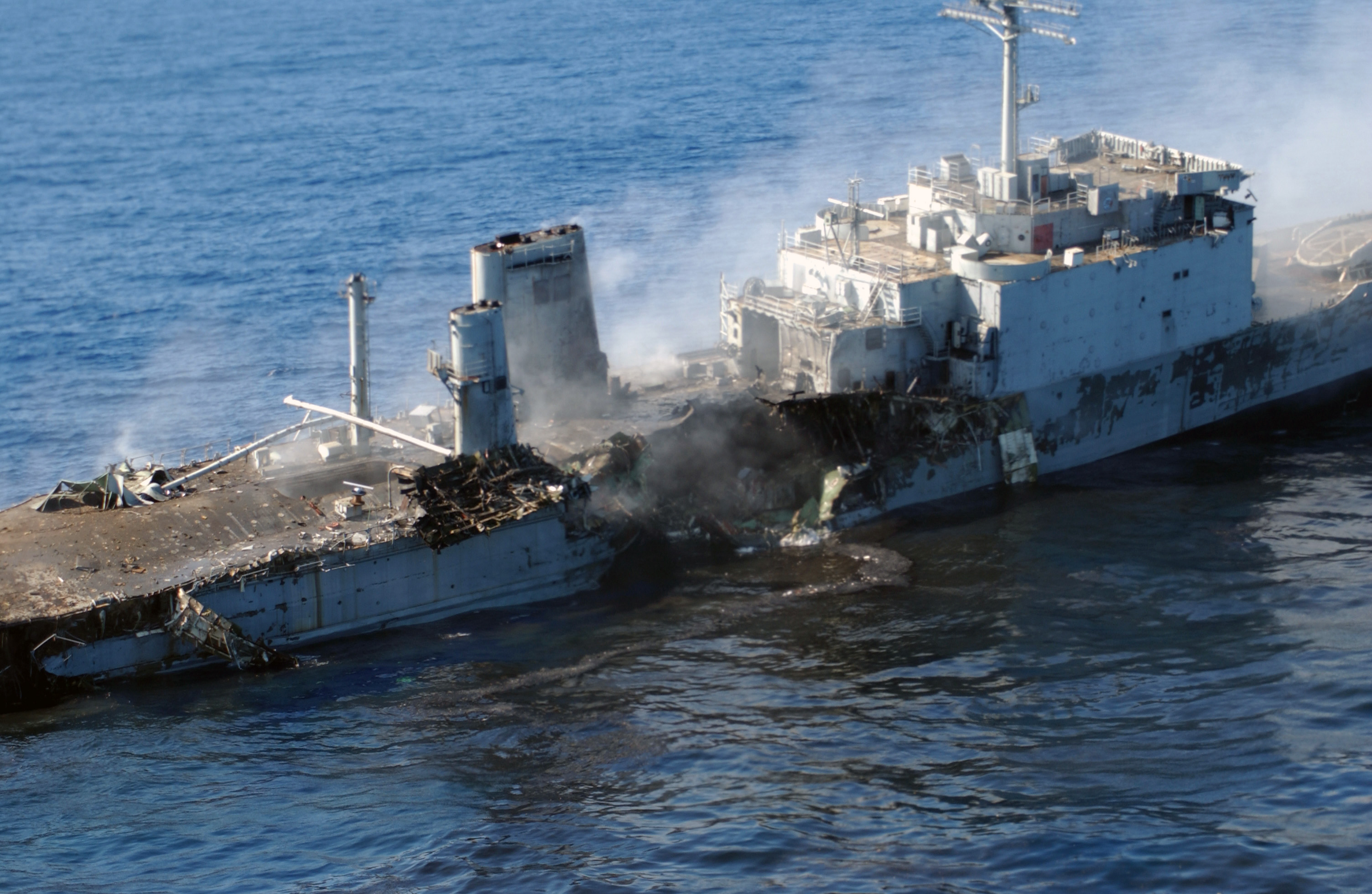
The tank landing ship ex-USS Schenectady lists after being struck by seven 2,000lb Joint Direct Attack Munitions during exercise Resultant Fury at the Pacific Missile Range Facility off the Island of Kauai, Hawaii, on Nov. 23, 2004.

- Rivet - U.S. Air Force first-word name for Big Safari acquisition, modification and logistics support special purpose weapons system programs
  - Rivet Ace – Post-Vietnam War era Phase VI ECM defensive avionics upgrade program for B-52G/H Stratofortress aircraft
  - Rivet Acorn – Special purpose Big Safari C-130E program (1975)
  - Rivet Add – Modification of Minuteman-II launch facilities to hold Minuteman III missiles
  - Rivet Amber – one of a kind Boeing RC-135E reconnaissance aircraft equipped with a large 7 MW Hughes Aircraft phased-array radar system. Originally designated C-135B-II, project name Lisa Ann.
  - Rivet Ball – Special purpose Big Safari program
  - Rivet Bounce – Special purpose Big Safari program. Likely the ECM system mounted on the Ryan Model 147 drone during Vietnam War operations to interfere with the Soviet S-75 SAM's SNR-75's radar.
  - Rivet Bounder – Special purpose Big Safari program.
  - Rivet Box – Special purpose Big Safari program, for the conversion of C-97G Stratofreighter 52-2688 for photo reconnaissance duties, under the designation Project "Eager Beaver," started in July 1961. The aircraft was delivered to the 7405th Support Squadron in July 1963. The project name was changed to ‘Rivet Box’ in January 1967. Used for photo reconnaissance within the West Berlin Air Corridors.
  - Rivet Brass – Special purpose Big Safari program
  - Rivet Can – Special purpose Big Safari program
  - Rivet Cap – 1981-1984 decommissioning of Titan II intercontinental ballistic missiles
  - Rivet Card – Special purpose Big Safari program
  - Rivet Chip – Special purpose Big Safari program
  - Rivet Clamp – Special purpose Big Safari program
  - Rivet Dandy – Special purpose Big Safari program
  - Rivet Digger – Special purpose Big Safari program
  - Rivet Doctor – Special purpose Big Safari program
  - Rivet Duke – Special purpose C-130E program (1975)
  - Rivet Eagle – Special purpose Big Safari program
  - Rivet Fire – Special purpose Big Safari program
  - Rivet Flare – Special purpose Big Safari program
  - Rivet Flash – Special purpose Big Safari program
  - Rivet Giant – Special purpose Big Safari program
  - Rivet Gumbo – Special purpose Big Safari program
  - Rivet Gym – Special purpose Big Safari program, Lockheed EC-121 Warning Star operations during Vietnam War with addition of Vietnamese-speaking intelligence specialists manning four voice communications intercept stations able to monitor all communications between Vietnam Peoples' Air Force MiGs and their GCI controllers.
  - Rivet Jaw – Special purpose Big Safari program
  - Rivet Joint – Special purpose RC-135 Big Safari program
  - Rivet Kit – Special purpose C-130E program (1976)
  - Rivet Kite – Special purpose Big Safari program
  - Rivet Lass – Special purpose Big Safari program
  - Rivet Lock – Special purpose Big Safari program
  - Rivet Mile – Minuteman Integrated Life Extension. Included IMPSS security system upgrade.
  - Rivet Pusher – Special purpose Big Safari program
  - Rivet Quick – Special purpose Big Safari program
  - Rivet Rambler – Phase V ECM systems upgrade project for B-52D Stratofortress
  - Rivet Rap – Special purpose Big Safari program
  - Rivet Rider – Volant Solo EC-130Es Psychological warfare aircraft with full suite of electronic combat equipment.
  - Rivet Save – "The Rivet Save program required two modifications of launch control center (LCC) equipment to prevent unauthorized launch of the nuclear-armed Minuteman ICBM while one crew member slept. First, SAC needed to eliminate the LCC's independent launch capability by removing the launch enable code from the LCC. Then, SAC would install a re-modeled LCC Launch Enable Control Group (LECG) panel which could enable the missile, only after receiving the SIOP [author's note: this acronym refers to the strategic war plan and execution procedures] unlock code."
  - Rivet Slice – Special purpose Big Safari program
  - Rivet Stand – KC-135R Big Safari program
  - Rivet Switch – 1970s program to upgrade VHF and UHF air/ground communications to solid state devices.
  - Rivet Top – Big Safari program adding special purpose identification friend or foe (IFF) interrogation equipment to EC-121M Warning Star
- Operation Road Block – Show of force deployment in November 1956 during the Suez Crisis and Hungarian Revolution. A stream of 72 B-47 Stratojets flew to the Arctic, where they could be detected by Soviet intelligence sites. The bombers broke into 4 ship cells and simulated attacks on targets in the United States. The 36 bombers from the 301st Bombardment Wing carried nuclear weapons.
- Project Rocky Mountain – Study of the use of liquid deuterium in nuclear weapons,
- Operation Roll-Up – US Army effort to reclaim, refurbish, and redeploy equipment from World War II into the Korean War
- Operation Rolling Thunder – Air strikes on North Vietnam
- Royal Duke - Elint and Comint monitoring of Nicaragua by "Guardrail" Beechcraft King Air RU-21H aircraft of an Army Security Agency aviation company, first half of 1980s. 114th ASA Aviation Company reported by UK Warplane partwork no. 46, 1986.
- Rugged Nautilus '96 – a joint service exercise aimed at discouraging any possible terrorist challenges through a show of force in the Gulf while the 1996 Atlanta Olympics were underway. Also described as "...a USAF-Navy exercise to test US Central Command's ability to gather and organize forces quickly in theater."
- Rusty Dagger - the AGM-188 Rusty Dagger is a low-cost precision-guided air-launched stand-off munition being developed by Zone 5 Technologies for the United States Air Force (USAF) Extended Range Attack Munition (ERAM) program which started in August 2024.

=== S ===
- Exercise Saber Guardian – July 2016 exercise involving 116th Cavalry Brigade Combat Team (ARNG) and troop elements from Armenia, Azerbaijan, Bulgaria, Canada, Georgia, Moldova, Poland, Romania, Ukraine and the U.S.
- Saber Safe – Minuteman pre-launch survivability program
- Saber Secure – A Minuteman rebasing program
- Safari Hunter – 2017 operation in Somalia with SNA/Jubaland striking north from Kismayo against Al-Shabaab centered in Middle Juba. "Hunter" series shows Somali National Army Danab participation.

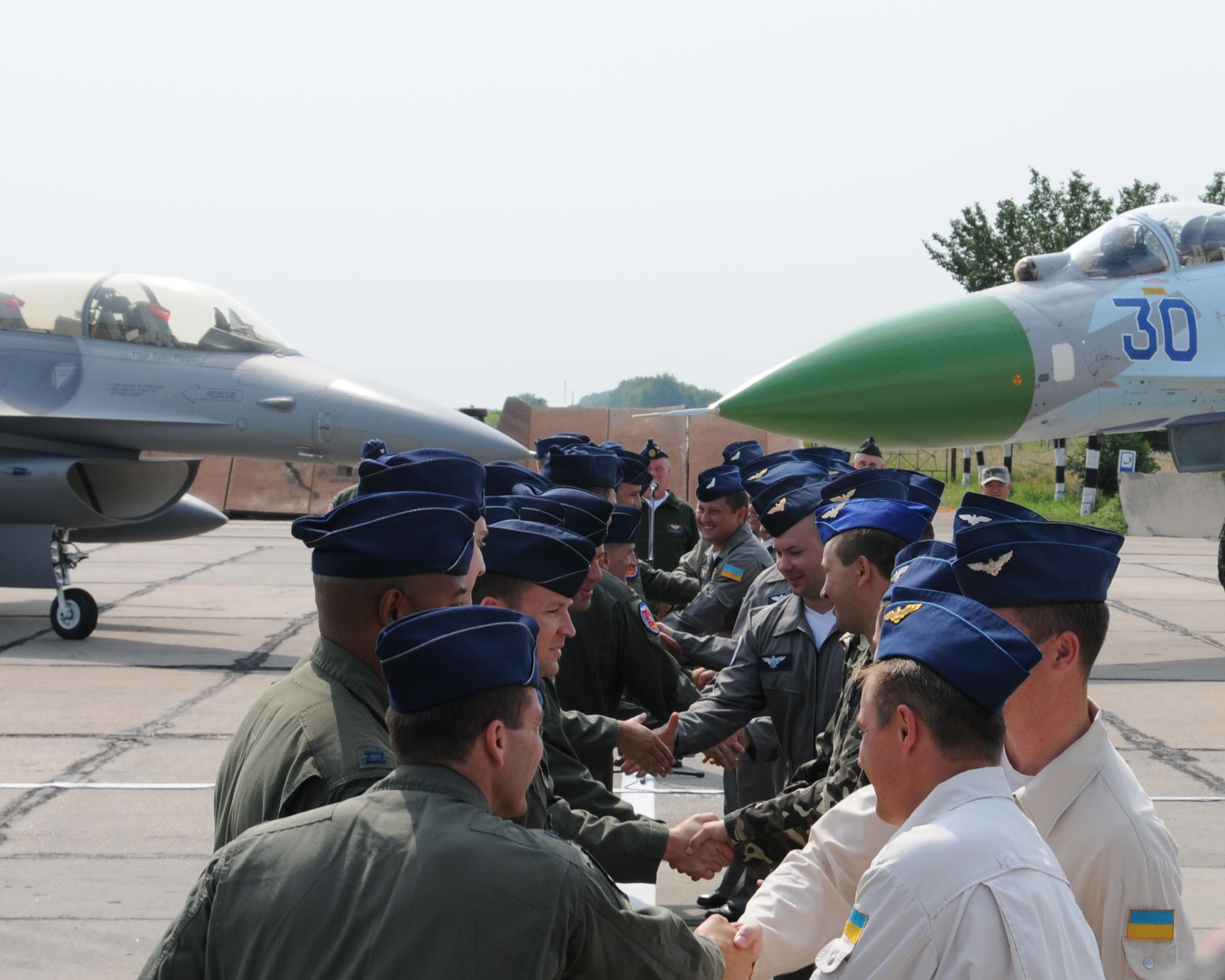
Personnel from the Air National Guard and Ukrainian Air Force group-greet each other during Safe Skies 2011

- Exercise Safe Skies – 2011 Ukrainian, Polish and American air forces fly-together to help prepare the Polish and Ukrainians for enhanced air supremacy and air sovereignty operations. Envisaged as helping lead up to Ukraine hosting Euro 2012. California Air National Guard began preparing the event in 2009 via the State Partnership Program.
- Exercise Sage Brush – November–December 1955 joint U.S. Army/Air Force exercise at Fort Polk, Louisiana, lasting forty-five days. Involved 110,000 Army and 30,500 Air Force personnel to trial army airmobility concepts to try to settle a dispute over the matter by the Army and Air Force. Some helicopter lift provided by the special 516th Troop Carrier Group, Assault, Rotary Wing, flying Piasecki H-21s as part of the 20th Combat Airlift Division (Provisional).

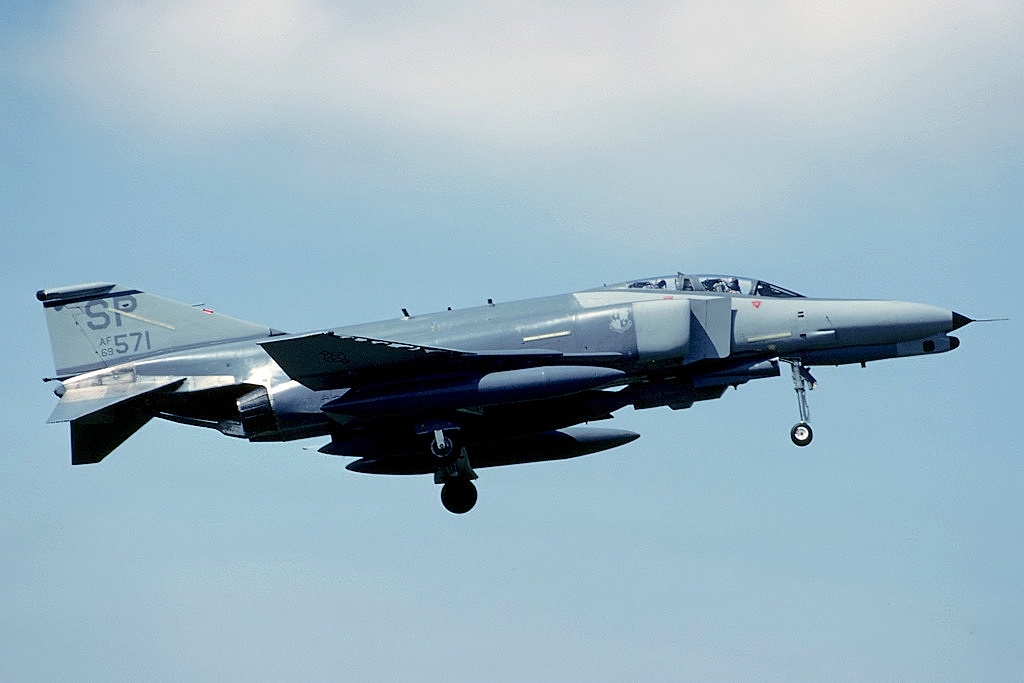
52nd TFW F-4G Phantom II taking part in exercise Salty Hammer, 22 May 1990

- Saharan Express – AFRICOM Naval Forces Africa scheduled and conducted, multilateral combined maritime exercises with West and North African states, supported by European partners, focusing on maritime security, and domain awareness. Saharan Express 2012 was to be held 23–30 April 2012.
- Sam Spade – 1956 ELINT missions by EB-47s from Incirlik Air Base.
- Operation Sand Flea – A series of training exercises the December 1989 invasion of Panama by the United States. These practices were conducted in part as training to defend the Panama Canal (a contingency then called Purple Storm), but were also intended simply to affirm the right of the US military to engage in them. Conducted in the summer of 1989, these seemingly endless movements, also known as "Freedom of Movement Drills," overwhelmed the ability of the Panamanians to observe, analyze and understand the activities. In this way, this program desensitized the Panama Defense Force (PDF) to the coming invasion.
- Exercise Salty Hammer – NATO air defense exercise, including sorties flown over the UK.
- Project Sapphire – Transport of 1,300 pounds (590 kg) of highly enriched uranium from Kazakhstan to the United States in November 1994.
- Scope Light – Airborne command and control for Atlantic Command, operating Boeing EC-135P. 6th Airborne Command and Control Squadron, Langley AFB, VA, 1973–1992.
- Scope Signal, Scope Shield - communications
- Scope Warrior - USAF annual communications summit begun in October 1984
- Exercise Scrum Half - nuclear attack / civil defence exercise for UK conducted in 1978.
- Operation Sea Angel - Bangladesh
- Sea Breeze - EUCOM PfP biennial command post exercise/FTX usually held in Ukraine
- Operation Sea Signal
- Seaspray - CIA/Army clandestine air unit created after failure of Operation Eagle Claw, attempt to rescue the U.S. Embassy hostages after the 1979 Iranian revolution
- Sea Soldier - U.S.-Omani live-fire amphibious exercise series (Arkin, Code Names, 493)
- In August 2002, Marines from the 22nd Marine Expeditionary Unit carried out a long-range deployment exercise from the amphibious assault ship USS Wasp (LHD 1) into Djibouti. During the deployment the MEU also participated in Operation Sea Eagle in the Gulf of Aden. Sea Eagle was also a U.S., Japanese, Australian, and New Zealand exercise held in 1981.
- Operation Sealords – 1968 Mekong Delta and inland waterways campaign by the US Navy in Vietnam
- Operation Secure Tomorrow – A multinational peace operation that took place from February 2004 to July 2004 in Haiti.
- Seed Hawk X-Ray – 1971 program to modify Wild Weasel aircraft to operate the AGM-78B Standard ARM
- Seek - U.S. Air Force research and development first word. Multiple programs.

- Seek Clock - strategic nuclear related special access program (Arkin, 494)
- Project Seek Eagle – The United States Air Force certification process for determining safe/acceptable carriage and release limits, loading and unloading procedures, safe escape parameters, and ballistic accuracy for all stores in specified loading configurations.
- Project Seek Frost – In 1977 the Rome Air Development Center began the "Seek Igloo" project to find a replacement for the AN/FPS-19 radar that would require less power and would run for extended times without maintenance. In 1980, General Electric won the contest with their GE-592 design, and the final design was accepted by RADC on 30 September 1983 and passed acceptance tests that year. This system became the AN/FPS-117 radar. Seek Frost was officially concerned only with DEW Line radars outside Alaska.
- Project Seek Igloo – Portion of Project Seek Frost replacing DEW Line radars in Alaska.
- Project Seek Screen – Improvements to the Tactical Air Control System.
- Seek Spinner – 1987 evaluation of an upgraded CGM-121A as a low cost alternative to the AGM-136 Tacit Rainbow Suppression of Enemy Air Defenses missile.

- Senior - U.S. Air Force special access program and reconnaissance related first word

- Senior Ball – Shipment of material directed by USAF.
- Senior Blade – Senior Year ground station (a van capable of exploiting U-2R digital imagery).
- Senior Blue – Air-to-Air Anti-Radiation Missile (?)
- Senior Book – U-2R COMINT system, used on flights from Korat Royal Thai Air Force Base over the Gulf of Tonkin. First flight 17 August 1971. Information was downloaded in real time to a ground station at Nakhon Phanom Royal Thai Navy Base for relay to USAF fighters operating in Southeast Asia. Renamed Olympic Torch 11 April 1972.
- Senior Bowl – 2 B-52Hs, serials 60-21 and 60–36, modified to carry two Lockheed D-21B "Tagboard" reconnaissance drones
- Senior Cejay – Northrop B-2A stealth bomber, former Senior Ice (name changed when the development contract was awarded to Northrop on 4 November 1981). Sometimes quoted as Senior CJ.
- Senior Chevron – Senior Year-related program.
- Senior Citizen – Classified program; probably a projected Special Operations stealth and/or STOL transport aircraft. Arkin writes that this was an Aurora reconnaissance aircraft or similar low observable system.
- Senior Class – Shipment of material directed by Headquarters USAF.
- Senior Club – Low-observable anti-tamper advanced technology systems assessment.
- Senior Crown – Lockheed SR-71 reconnaissance aircraft, based on CIA-sponsored A-12 "Oxcart"
- Senior Dagger – A test & evaluation exercise performed by Control Data Corp. for Air Force Rome Air Development Center for purposes of reconnaissance. It may involve flights of Lockheed SR-71 reconnaissance aircraft in Southeast Asia.
- Senior Dance – ELINT/SIGINT program, possibly U-2 related.
- Senior Game – A military item shipping designation.
- Senior Glass – U-2 SIGINT sensor package upgrade combining Senior Spear and Senior Ruby
- Senior Guardian – Grob/E-Systems D-500 Egrett, high-altitude surveillance / reconnaissance aircraft, German-US cooperation, 1980s
- Senior Ice – Advanced Technology Bomber program, including Lockheed proposal and the Northrop B-2 stealth bomber; renamed Senior Cejay on 4 November 1981
- Senior Peg – proposal for a stealthy strategic bomber by Lockheed Corporation together with Rockwell International. It was created as part of the Advanced Technology Bomber competition, which started in 1979. Lost to a design by Northrop (Senior Ice), which would eventually become the Northrop Grumman B-2 Spirit.
- Senior Prom – Classified black project conducted by the US Air Force in conjunction with the Lockheed Corp's Skunk Works for the development and testing of a cruise missile using stealth technology, 1978–82.
- Senior Trend – Lockheed F-117 Nighthawk special access program development, previously Have Blue.

- Sentinel Alloy – Land gravity surveys in support of the Minuteman system, cancelled
- Sentinel Aspen – Upgrades in intelligence training, particularly the General Imagery Intelligence Training System.
- Sentinel Lock – Development of raster annotated photography by Aeronautical Charting and Information Service for mapping in Southeast Asia.

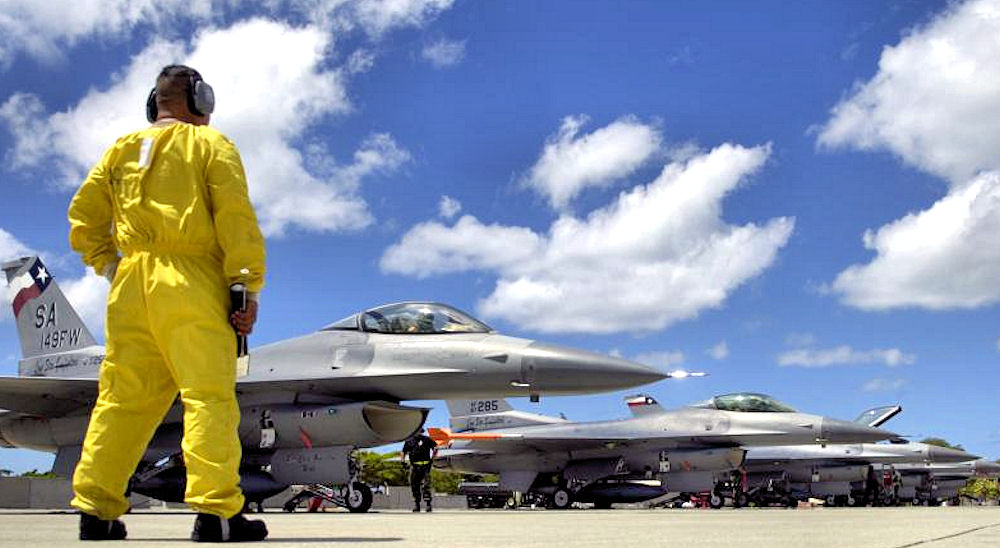
Six F-16s of the Texas Air National Guard traveled to Hawaii for Exercise Sentry Aloha in 2006.

- Sentry Aloha – Air National Guard fighter exercise, Hawaii, 2006
- Shadow Express – a Non-combatant evacuation operation in Liberia, September–October 1998, to assure the evacuation of Liberian faction leader Roosevelt Johnson (Krahn). Run by Special Operations Command, Europe, involving a 12-man survey and assessment team (ESAT), the USS Chinook (PC-9), dispatched from NSWU-10 at Rota, Spain, and a Hercules-delivered detachment of NSWU-2 which was moved to Freetown. USS Firebolt also arrived.
- Operation Sharp Edge – A non-combatant evacuation operation (NEO) carried out by the 22nd and 26th Marine Expeditionary Units of the United States Marine Corps in Liberia from 5–21 August 1990 (and 1991?). Involved USS Nashville (LPD-13).
- Operation Sharp Guard – A multi-year joint naval blockade in the Adriatic Sea by NATO and the Western European Union on shipments to the former Yugoslavia. Succeeding NATO's Maritime Guard and the WEU's Sharp Fence, it ran from 1993 to 1996.
- Shining Brass – Covert operation in Laos, renamed Prairie Fire
- Operation Shining Express – NEO evacuation in Liberia, 2003, coordinated aboard USS Kearsarge (LHD-3).
- Short Order – Strategic Air Command tactical single sideband high frequency radio net for positive control of the tactical force
- Silent Barker – Observation satellite to track geosynchronous objects in space. Jointly developed by Space Force and the National Reconnaissance office
- Silent Thunder – see Island Thunder
- Silent Warrior – Exercise Silent Warrior 16, held in Garmisch, Germany from Nov. 9–13, 2016, brought together U.S. Special Operations Forces and representatives from 19 African states to discuss cooperative methods to combat violent extremism/extremist organizations.
- Operation Silk Purse – Airborne command and control for European Command, mostly operating EC-135H aircraft at RAF Mildenhall.
- Operation Silver Wake – 1997 evacuation of American and allied noncombatants from Albania
- Operation Sixteen Ton – Use of reserve troop carrier units to move United States Coast Guard equipment From Floyd Bennett Naval Air Station to Isla Grande Airport in Puerto Rico and San Salvador in the Bahamas.
- Project Skoshi Tiger – US Air Force operational test and evaluation of the Northrop F-5 in Vietnam
- Sky Map – A classified US Air Force aerospace mapping and geodetic research program/project in the early 1960s, established to solve a critical limitation of the early Cold War era: geodetic uncertainty.
- Sky Shield – A series of three large-scale military exercises conducted in the United States in 1960, 1961, and 1962 by the North American Aerospace Defense Command (NORAD) and the Strategic Air Command (SAC) to test defenses against a Soviet Air Forces attack.
- Project Smokey Joe – Later name for Project Low Card.
- Snowfence 90 CAMPLAN - Campaign Plan for NORAD anti-drug operations, 1990.
- Operation Southern Spear — Department of Defense operation to quell narco-terrorism in the western hemisphere. Led into United States strikes in Venezuela.
- Operation Southern Watch – Enforcement of no fly zone in southern Iraq
- Exercise Space Flag is a United States Space Force exercise dedicated to providing tactical space units with advanced training under contested, degraded, and operationally-limited ("CDO") conditions. First held circa 2017.
- Project Space Track – see Harvest Moon
- Project Sparrow Hawk – Original name for Project Skoshi Tiger.
- Exercise Spring Train – an annual Royal Navy-led exercise.
- Operation Stair Step – Deployment of mobilized Air National Guard fighter squadrons to France to replace forces deployed under Operation Tack Hammer during the 1961 Berlin Crisis.
- Exercise Square Leg - UK nuclear attack / civil defence exercise conducted in 1980. The scenario involved around 130 warheads with a total yield of 205 megatons (69 ground burst, 62 air burst) with an average of 1.5 megatons per bomb. The exercise was criticised as unrealistic as an actual exchange may be much larger or smaller, and did not include targets in Inner London such as Whitehall. Even so, the effect of the limited attack in Square Leg was estimated to be 29 million dead (53 per cent of the population) and 6.4 million seriously injured.
- Operation Starlite – US Marine Corps actions near Chu Lai, 1965
- Operation Steel Box/Golden Python – DOD supported withdrawal of chemical munitions from Germany and coordination of delivery/transport to Johnston Atoll.
- Operation Steel Tiger – Interdiction of the Ho Chi Minh Trail in southern Laos or the area of operations
- Operation Steep Hill (I through XV) – Planning and intelligence operations for the use of military force to prevent violence in association with civil rights demonstrations in the early 1960s. Steep Hill XIII called elements of the Alabama National Guard and regular army into service to protect marches from Selma to Montgomery, Alabama.

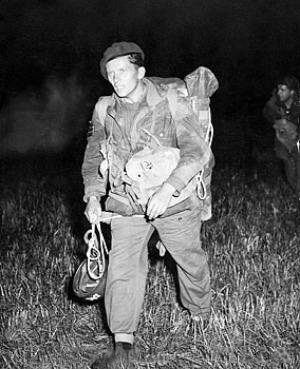
A reservist member of the British Special Air Service walks off a drop zone during Exercise Strong Enterprise in Denmark, 1955.

- Strong Enterprise - NATO AFNORTH exercise 1955.
- Stellar Wind was the code name of a National Security Agency (NSA) warrantless surveillance program begun under the George W. Bush administration's President's Surveillance Program (PSP). The program was approved by President Bush shortly after the September 11, 2001 attacks.
- Project Sun Valley – 1957 project to modify ten Lockheed C-130A Hercules aircraft for signals intelligence
- Sunset Lily – A project to conduct a test launch of a Martin CGM-13B Mace missile from Kadena Air Base, Okinawa to a target island in Japan after testing of the Mace/Matador family had at Cape Canaveral Air Force Station ended. Cancelled because of political implications.
- Surprise Package – Lockheed AC-130A Spectre gunship program, forerunner of Pave Pronto
- Operation Swift Lift – Use of reserve units to transport high priority cargo for the air force during their inactive duty training periods.
- Exercise Swift Strike – A series of joint exercises in the 1960s. Swift Strike III took place in July and August 1963 in the Carolinas and Georgia, involving over 100,000 men, including members of the National Guard as well as active forces.

=== T ===
- Talent Keyhole - covers space-based IMINT (imagery intelligence), SIGINT (signals intelligence), and MASINT (measurement and signature intelligence) collection platforms; related processing and analysis techniques; and research, design, and operation of these platforms. See Sensitive compartmented information.
- Tacit Rainbow – 1980s program to develop a low cost antiradiation missile with a loitering capability. Developed by Northrop as AGM-136A, cancelled in 1992 due to cost overruns.
- Operation Tack Hammer – 1961 Deployment of eight fighter squadrons from the United States to France responding to the 1961 Berlin Crisis. Replaced by mobilized Air National Guard units under Operation Stair Step.
- Exercise Talisman Sabre – Biennial joint exercise involving United States and Australian military forces.
- Operation Tally Ho – Interdiction operations in Route Package 1, southern part of North Viet Nam
- Exercise Talon Shield - US Air Force components of the 55th Wing deployed to Australia to show force interoperability with the RAAF
- Tamale Pete – Vietnam War air refueling operations planning. See Young Tiger.
- Tandem Thrust – in 2005, Exercise Tandem Thrust, along with Exercises Crocodile and Kingfisher, was combined to form Exercise Talisman Saber.
- Teal Ruby – STS-62-A was a planned Space Shuttle mission to deliver a reconnaissance payload (Teal Ruby) into polar orbit
- Exercise Teamwork – A major NATO biennial exercise in defense of Norway against a Soviet land and maritime threat. It was established by Norway, Denmark, the UK and the U.S. in 1982 and grew considerably up until the early 1990s. Teamwork '88 allowed NATO to evaluate its ability to conduct a maritime campaign in the Norwegian Sea and project forces ashore in northern Norway. Teamwork '92 was the largest NATO exercise for more than a decade. Held in the northern spring of 1992, it included a total of over 200 ships and 300 aircraft, held in the North Atlantic. Vice Admiral Nicholas Hill-Norton, Flag Officer, Surface Flotilla, led the RN contingent as Commander, Anti-Submarine Warfare Striking Force (CASWF), with Commodore Amphibious Warfare (COMAW) embarked in HMS Fearless.
- Tempest Express – United States Pacific Command computer-assisted exercise to train the HQ USPACOM staff to function as a Joint Task Force headquarters. The exercise is held as often as needed, three to seven times a year. Tempest Express 2013 involved elements of the PACOM command post travelling to New Zealand to carry out a disaster relief exercise.
- Tempest Rapid – Employment of DOD resources in natural disaster emergencies in the Continental United States.
- Temple Fortune - not a U.S. codename. Assigned by British agencies to Soviet biological warfare programme defector, 1992.
- Thracian Star – Exercises between the U.S. Air Force and the Bulgarian Air Force, name is followed by year of exercise.
- Thirsty Camel – 1966 deployment of Convair F-102 aircraft from Travis AFB to Naha AB.
- Operation Tiger Hound – Air interdiction operations in the Steel Tiger area of Laos
- Operation Tomahawk – Deployment of airmobile forces in the Battle of the Imjin River during the Korean War
- Top Flight – 1959 operation to set a Fédération Aéronautique Internationale zoom altitude record with a YF4H-1 Phantom II
- Trojan Horse – Replacement name for Lucky Dragon operations starting in December 1964. After Operation Rolling Thunder began in March 1965, U-2 flights were restricted from surface to air missile sites. The name changed to Giant Dragon on 1 July 1967.
- Tropic Moon III – Martin B-57G fitted with Low Light Television and other sensors for night operations
- Operation Try Out – Test of proposed Strategic Air Command aircraft ground alert at Hunter Air Force Base from November 1956 to March 1957, demonstrating its feasibility.

=== U ===
- Ulchi-Freedom Guardian – previously Ulchi Focus Lens. Command post/computerised exercise simulating the defense of South Korea.
- Ultimate Hunter – "A 127e counterterrorism program using a U.S.-trained, equipped and directed Ugandan force in Somalia." The base mentioned was Camp Lemonnier, Djibouti.
- Unified Resolve - search for Taliban/Al-Qaeda, June 2003, see 2003 in Afghanistan.
- Operations Union I/II – US Marine Corps in the Quế Sơn Valley
- Union Flash – Simulation exercise, annual, 1998: USAFE Warrior Preparation Center, Einsiedlerhof AFS, Germany, 05/1998.
- United Effort – Use of Ryan 147E drones and Boeing RB-47H to gather ELINT on SA-2 sites in North Viet Nam. First missions flown 16 October 1965. Fourth mission successfully captured the fusing signal before being hit by the SA-2. With the critical information obtained and all drones lost, the operation was terminated in February 1966 and the B-47s returned to Forbes Air Force Base.
- Operation United Shield 1995 – Support of US withdrawal from Somalia.
- Operation Unified Resolve
- Upgrade Silo – A modification improvement program for Minuteman III.
- Upgun Cobras – A Bell Huey Cobra with a Sperry helmet-mounted optical gunsight.
- Operation Uphold Democracy—removal of junta in Haiti
- Upper Hand – A joint U.S.-Norwegian exercise designed to promote proficiency in Anti-Submarine Warfare (ASW), underway logistic support, and communications procedures.
- Operation Urgent Fury — United States invasion of Grenada, 25–29 October 1983.

=== V ===
- Valiant Blitz – 1990 iteration amphibious exercise landing in South Korea, part of larger PACEX 89.
- Exercise Valiant Shield – United States Pacific Command large-scale warfighting exercise
- Exercise Valiant Usher 86 – a declassified U.S. Central Command historical document said that: 'Valiant Usher 86 was conducted in Somalia from 1 to 7 November 1985. Initially planned to be an amphibious, combined/joint exercise including the Mediterranean Marine Amphibious Unit/Amphibious Ready Group (ARG)and [Somali] forces, the exercise was completely restructured when the ARG was retained in the Mediterranean and replaced with a battalion (-) of the 101st Airborne Division. In spite of limited planning time, the exercise was described as a "total success", highlighting both the rapid capability.. to substitute forces, as well as the flexibility of the forces to accomplish assigned objectives.'
- Victory Scrimmage – V Corps multi-divisional exercise of January–February 2003 to prepare for Operation Iraqi Freedom
- Exercise Vigilant Eagle – NORAD/Russian Armed Forces exercise, repeated several times, involving response to a simulated hijacked airliner over Canadian/U.S./Russian airspace.
- Operation Vigilant Warrior 1994 – Response to Iraqi buildup along Kuwait border.
- Operation Volant Dew — Petroleum resupply for radar stations on the northern ice cap.
- Volant Oak – See Coronet Oak. Operation name when directed by Military Airlift Command from 1977 to 1992
- Volant Solo – Coronet Solo renamed when EC-130Es replaced EC-121s as psychological warfare aircraft.
- Volant Wind - airlift operation to move Operation Desert Shield personnel and material to Middle East.
- Exercise Vortex Warrior – RAF Chinook exercise for desert operations in preparation for Afghan deployments at the U.S. Naval Air Facility El Centro, in Imperial County, Southern California. 2014, planned 2018.

=== W ===
- Wanda Belle – "was Nancy Rae, 1 RC-135S '59-1491', named after Wanda Leigh O'Rear, daughter of Big Safari program director F. E. O'Rear, 01/1964-01/1967, to Rivet Ball, modified under Big Safari."
- Operation Watch Tower – Test of proposed Strategic Air Command aircraft ground alert at Little Rock Air Force Base from April to November 1957, intended to solve problems identified during Operation Try Out.
- Operation Water Glass – Air defense detachments in Vietnam in 1962-1963
- Operation Water Pump – Training project for Laotian and Thai pilots at Udorn Royal Thai Air Force Base by Detachment 6, 1st Air Commando Wing and later by Detachment 1, 56th Special Operations Wing
- Project Water Supply – Project by Sandia Laboratories and the Army Corps of Engineers to design and construct storage sites for nuclear weapons. The first site opened in 1949 and the last in 1957.
- Whale Tale - U-2 missions to take photos of the French Mururoa nuclear test site.
- White Alice – White Alice Communications System (WACS), a United States Air Force telecommunication network with 80 radio stations located in Alaska during the Cold War.
- White Cloud – (1) A Navy program for liquid propellant guns; (2) USN, ocean reconnaissance/surveillance Naval Ocean Surveillance System, first generation of satellites.

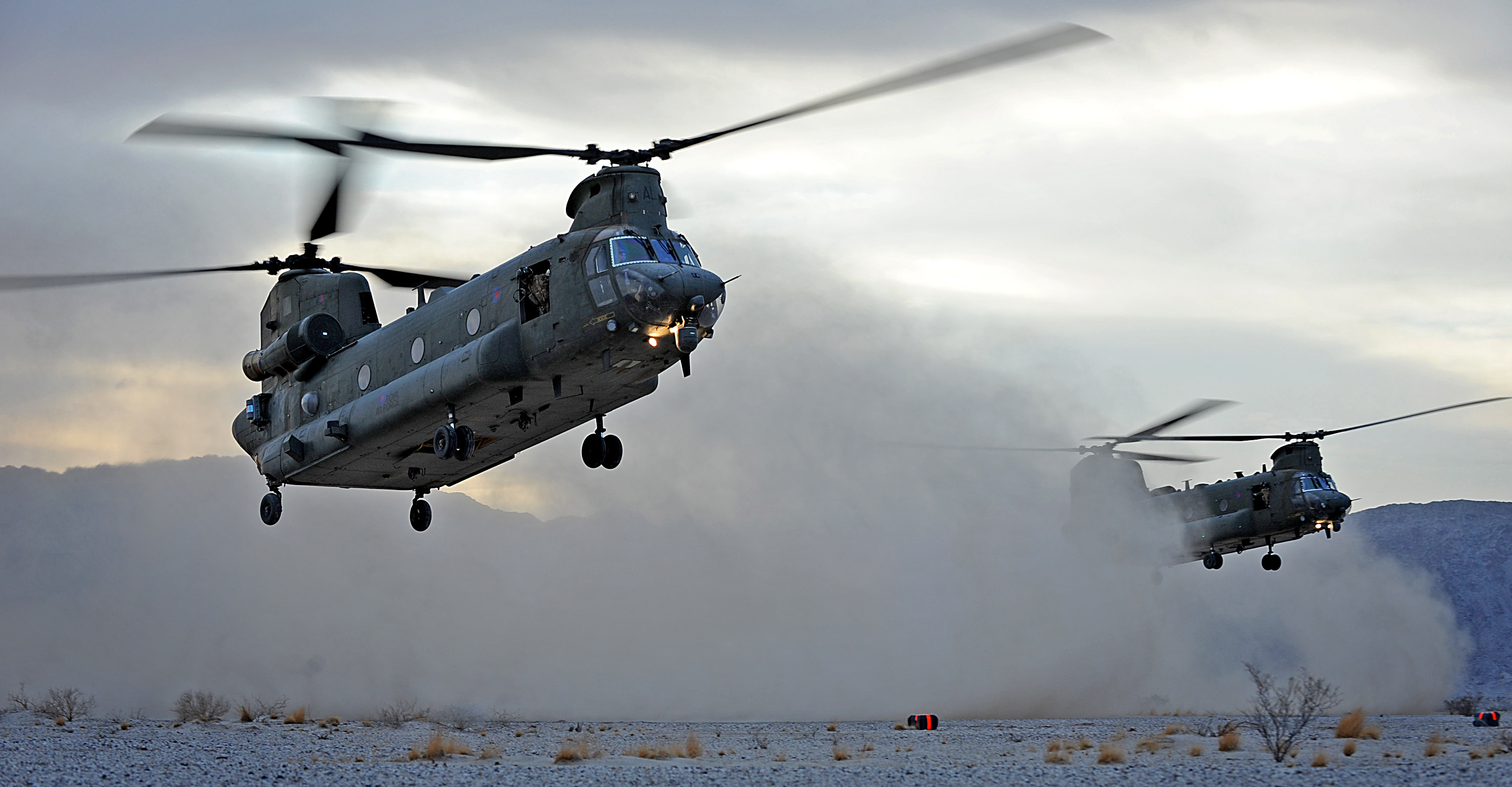
Chinook helicopters from No. 18 (B) Squadron RAF practising desert operations during Exercise Vortex Warrior '14, April 2014.

- Operation White Star – Also known as Project White Star, was a United States military advisory mission to Laos in 1959–62.
- Wild Weasel – general codename for U.S. Air Force Suppression of Enemy Air Defenses fighter-bomber aircraft. Air-launched anti-radar missile firing aircraft guided by radar emissions
- Witch Doctor – Photo reconnaissance mission (circa 1966)

=== Y ===
- Yankee Team – reconnaissance over Laos 1964; Vietnam War Tanker Task Force.
- Yellow Tag – An electronics project administered by Naval Sea Systems Command.
- Young Tiger – Tanker Task Force. [P]lanned under Tamale Pete, Operations Order for Boeing KC-135 Stratotanker force operating from Kadena Air Base and later Ching Chuan Kang Air Base (1967 onwards), refueling tactical air operations over Vietnam, Laos, etc. after 1965."

== See also ==
- Lists of allied military operations of the Vietnam War
- United States military nuclear incident terminology
