= Groom Lake (disambiguation) =

Groom Lake is the official name of the Nevada test site installation commonly referred to as Area 51.

Groom Lake may also refer to:

- Groom Lake (salt flat), a salt flat immediately north of Area 51
- Groom Lake (film), a 2002 film also known as The Visitor
