= Aurora (aircraft) =

Rumored aircraft

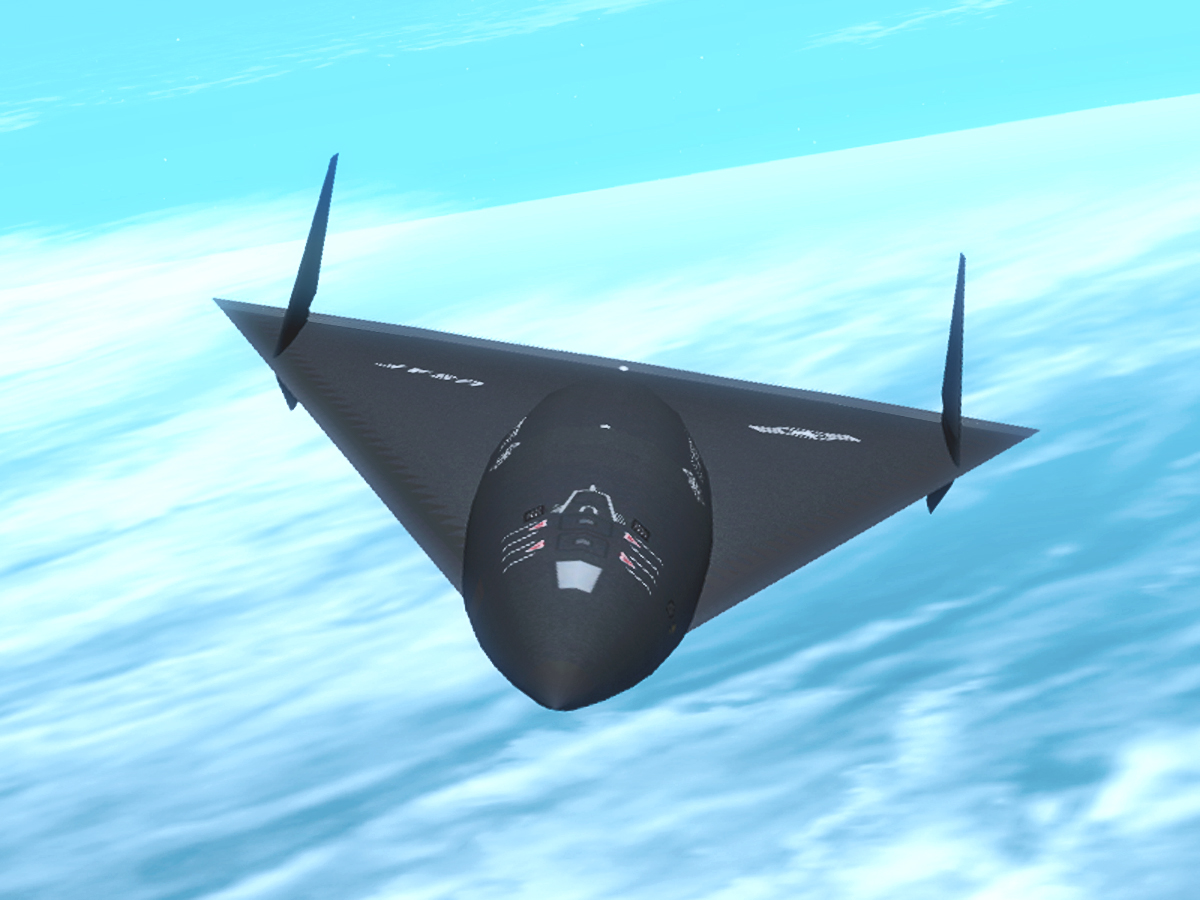
An artist's conception of the Aurora aircraft (Janes conception, appearing in Jane's ATF: Advanced Tactical Fighters)

Aurora is a rumored mid-1980s American reconnaissance aircraft. There is no substantial evidence that it was ever built or flown and it has been termed a myth.

The U.S. government has consistently denied such an aircraft was ever built. Aviation and space reference site Aerospaceweb.org stated in 2008 that, "Since the evidence supporting the Aurora is circumstantial or pure conjecture, there is little reason to contradict the government's position."

Former Skunk Works director Ben Rich confirmed that "Aurora" was simply a myth in Skunk Works, a 1994 book detailing his time as director. Rich wrote that a colonel working in the Pentagon arbitrarily assigned the name "Aurora" to the funding for the B-2 bomber design competition and somehow the name was leaked to the media.

In 2006, veteran black project watcher and aviation writer Bill Sweetman said, "Does Aurora exist? Years of pursuit have led me to believe that, yes, Aurora is most likely in active development, spurred on by recent advances that have allowed technology to catch up with the ambition that launched the program a generation ago."

== Background ==
The Aurora legend started in 1985, when the Los Angeles Times and later Aviation Week & Space Technology magazine broke the news that the term "Aurora" had been inadvertently included in the 1985 U.S. budget, as a requested allocation of $2.3 billion for "black aircraft production" in FY 1987. According to Aviation Week, Project Aurora referred to a group of exotic aircraft, and not to one particular airframe. In the 1994 book Skunk Works, Ben Rich, the former head of Lockheed's Skunk Works division, wrote that the Aurora was the budgetary code name for a component of the B-2 Spirit.

== Evidence ==
By the late 1980s, many aerospace industry observers believed that the U.S. had the technological capability to build a Mach 5 (hypersonic speed) replacement for the aging Lockheed SR-71 Blackbird. Detailed examinations of the U.S. defense budget claimed to have found money missing or channeled into black projects. By the mid-1990s, reports surfaced of sightings of unidentified aircraft flying over California and the United Kingdom involving odd-shaped contrails, sonic booms, and related phenomena that suggested the US had developed such an aircraft. Nothing ever linked any of these observations to any program or aircraft type, but the name Aurora was often tagged on these as a way of explaining the observations.

=== British sighting claims ===
In late August 1989, while working as an engineer on the jack-up barge GSF Galveston Key in the North Sea, Chris Gibson saw an unfamiliar isosceles triangle-shaped delta aircraft, apparently refueling from a Boeing KC-135 Stratotanker and accompanied by a pair of F-111 fighter-bombers. Gibson watched the aircraft for several minutes, until they went out of sight. He subsequently drew a sketch of the formation.

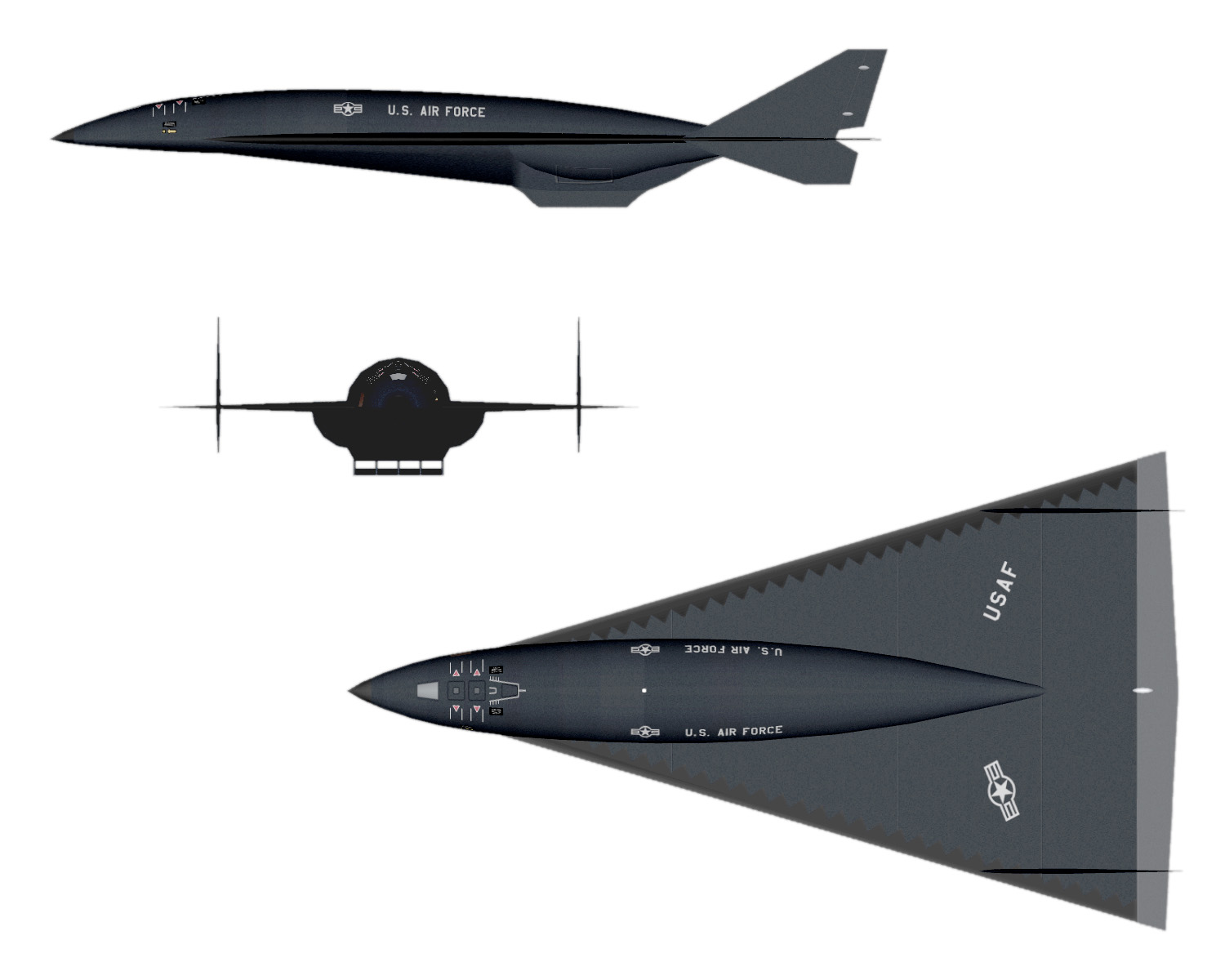
Artist's rendering of the Aurora from various angles

When the sighting was made public in 1992, the British Defence Secretary Tom King was told, "There is no knowledge in the MoD of a 'black' program of this nature, although it would not surprise the relevant desk officers in the Air Staff and Defence Intelligence Staff if it did exist."

Group Captain Tom Eeles, RAF, writes of a mystery aircraft flying over his house, near to the Mildenhall USAF base in Suffolk, at about 2:00 am on a Sunday morning in the autumn of 1993. He had been awoken by "a very strange-sounding aircraft passing overhead; the engine noise was a pulsing sound quite unlike anything I'd heard before." He saw lights disappearing towards Mildenhall. Inquiries were made of a senior RAF officer at Mildenhall the following morning, at which point he was told firmly "to stop making inquiries at once". Group Captain Eeles attributes this sighting to a new stealth aircraft called Aurora. A few weeks earlier, there had been "an unexplained incident at Boscombe Down apparently involving an emergency landing by an unknown US aircraft, after which it was covered in tarpaulins and removed with great secrecy by an American C-5 transport aircraft."

A crash at RAF Boscombe Down in Wiltshire on 26 September 1994 appeared closely linked to "black" missions, according to a report in AirForces Monthly. Further investigation was hampered by USAF aircraft flooding into the base. Special Air Service personnel arrived in plainclothes in an Agusta 109. The crash site was protected from view by fire engines and tarpaulins and the base was closed to all flights soon afterwards. More recent analysis, however, indicates that the Boscombe Down crash was a towed missile decoy.

An unsubstantiated claim on the Horsted Keynes Village Web Site purports to show photos of the trail left after an unusual sonic boom was heard over the village in July 2002. In 2005 the information was used in a BBC report about the Aurora project.

=== U.S. sighting claims ===
A series of unusual sonic booms was detected in Southern California beginning in mid-to-late 1991 and recorded by United States Geological Survey sensors across Southern California used to pinpoint earthquake epicenters. The sonic booms were characteristic of a smaller vehicle, rather than of the 37-meter long Space Shuttle orbiter. Furthermore, neither the Shuttle nor NASA's single SR-71B was operating on the days the booms had been registered. In the article, "In Plane Sight?" which appeared in the Washington City Paper on 3 July 1992 (pp. 12–13), one of the seismologists, Jim Mori, noted: "We can't tell anything about the vehicle. They seem stronger than other sonic booms that we record once in a while. They've all come on Thursday mornings about the same time, between 4 and 7." Former NASA sonic boom expert Dom Maglieri studied the 15-year-old sonic boom data from the California Institute of Technology and has deemed that the data showed "something at 90,000 ft (c. 27 km), Mach 4 to Mach 5.2". He also said the booms did not look like those from aircraft that had traveled through the atmosphere many miles away at Los Angeles International Airport; rather, they appeared to be booms from a high-altitude aircraft directly above the ground, moving at high speeds. The boom signatures of the two different aircraft patterns are wildly different. There was nothing particular to tie these events to any aircraft, but they served to increase the number of stories about the Aurora.

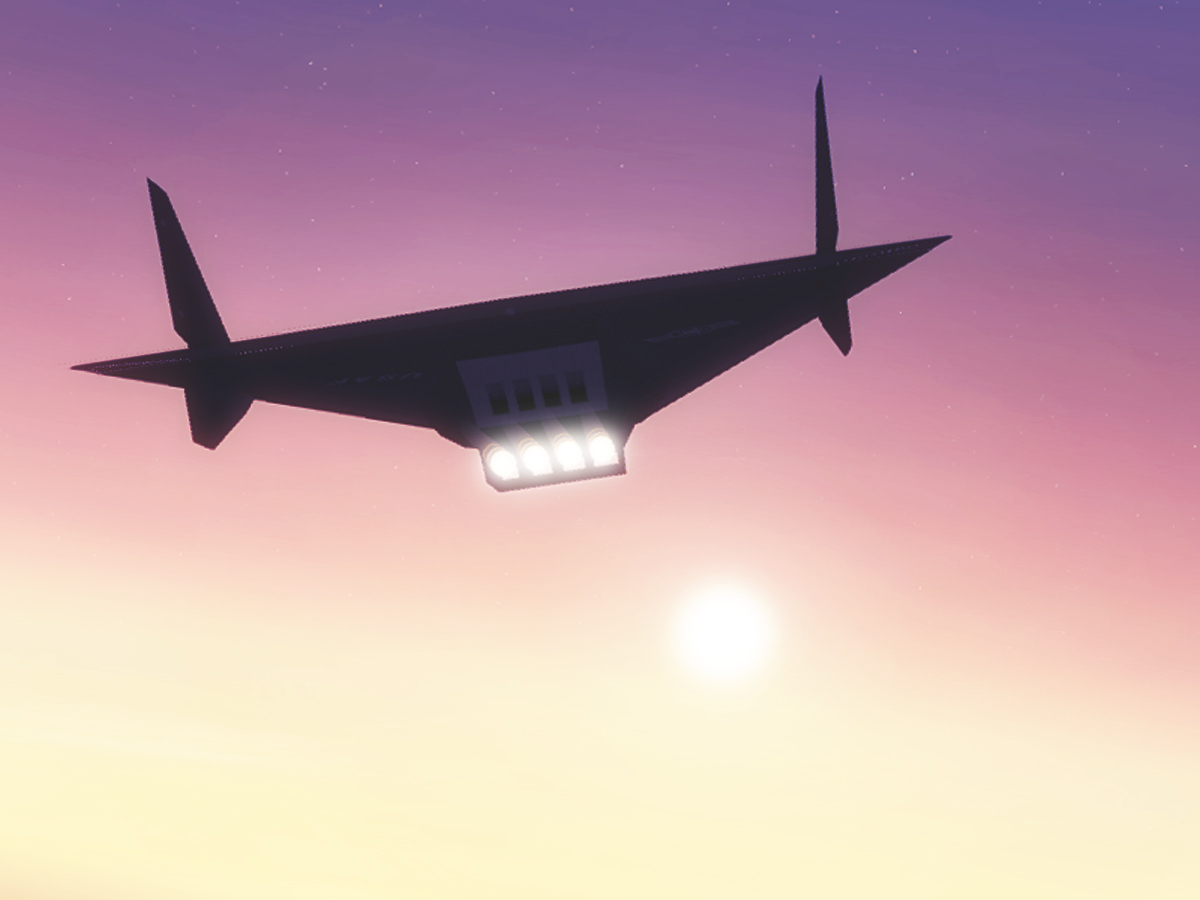
Artist's rendering of the Aurora from behind

On 23 March 1992, near Amarillo, Texas, Steven Douglass photographed the "donuts on a rope" contrail and linked this sighting to distinctive sounds. He described the engine noise as: "strange, loud pulsating roar ... unique ... a deep pulsating rumble that vibrated the house and made the windows shake ... similar to rocket engine noise, but deeper, with evenly timed pulses." In addition to providing the first photographs of the distinctive contrail previously reported by many, the significance of this sighting was enhanced by Douglass' reports of intercepts of radio transmissions: "Air-to-air communications ... were between an AWACS aircraft with the call sign "Dragnet 51" from Tinker AFB, Oklahoma, and two unknown aircraft using the call signs "Darkstar November" and "Darkstar Mike". Messages consisted of phonetically transmitted alphanumerics. It is not known whether this radio traffic had any association with the "pulser" that had just flown over Amarillo." ("Darkstar" is also a call sign of AWACS aircraft from a different squadron at Tinker AFB) A month later, radio enthusiasts in California monitoring Edwards AFB Radar (callsign "Joshua Control") heard early morning radio transmissions between Joshua and a high flying aircraft using the callsign "Gaspipe". "You're at 67,000 feet, 81 miles out" was heard, followed by "70 miles out now, 36,000 ft, above glideslope." As in the past, nothing linked these observations to any particular aircraft or program, but the attribution to the Aurora helped expand the legend.

In February 1994, a former resident of Rachel, Nevada, and Area 51 enthusiast, Chuck Clark, claimed to have filmed the Aurora taking off from the Groom Lake facility. In the David Darlington book Area 51: The Dreamland Chronicles, he said:

I even saw the Aurora take off one night – or an aircraft that matched the Aurora's reputed configuration: a sharp delta with twin tails about a hundred and thirty feet long. It taxied out of a lighted hangar at 2:30 a.m. and used a lot of runway to take off. It had one red light on top, but the minute the wheels left the runway, the light went off and that was the last I saw of it. I didn't hear it because the wind was blowing from behind me toward the base." I asked when this had taken place. "February 1994. Obviously they didn't think anybody was out there. It was thirty below zero – probably ninety below with the wind chill factor. I had hiked into White Sides from a different, harder way than usual, and stayed there two or three days among the rocks, under a camouflage tarp with six layers of clothes on. I had an insulated face mask and two sleeping bags, so I didn't present a heat signature. I videotaped the aircraft through a telescope with a five-hundred-millimeter f4 lens coupled via a C-ring to a high-eight digital video camera with five hundred and twenty scan lines of resolution, which is better than TV." The author then asked, "Where's the tape?" "Locked away. That's a legitimate spyplane; my purpose is not to give away legitimate national defense. When they get ready to unveil it, I'll probably release the tape."

=== Additional claims ===
By 1996, reports associated with the Aurora name dropped off in frequency, suggesting to people who believed that the aircraft existed that it had only ever been a prototype or that it had had a short service life.

In 2000, Aberdeen Press and Journal writer Nic Outterside wrote a piece on US stealth technology in Scotland. Citing confidential "sources", he alleged RAF/USAF Machrihanish in Kintyre, Argyll to be a base for Aurora aircraft. Machrihanish's almost 2-mile-long (3.2 km) long runway makes it suitable for high-altitude and experimental aircraft with the fenced-off coastal approach making it ideal for takeoffs and landings to be made well away from eyes or cameras of press and public. "Oceanic Air Traffic Control at Prestwick," Outterside says, "also tracked fast-moving radar blips. It was claimed by staff that a 'hypersonic jet was the only rational conclusion' for the readings."

In 2006, aviation writer Bill Sweetman put together 20 years of examining budget "holes", unexplained sonic booms, as well as the Gibson sighting and concluded:

This evidence helps establish the program's initial existence. My investigations continue to turn up evidence that suggests current activity. For example, having spent years sifting through military budgets, tracking untraceable dollars and code names, I learned how to sort out where money was going. This year, when I looked at the Air Force operations budget in detail, I found a $9-billion black hole that seems a perfect fit for a project like Aurora.

In June 2017, Aviation Week reported that Rob Weiss, the General Manager of the Skunk Works, provided some confirmation of a research project and stated that hypersonic flight technology was now mature, and efforts were underway to fly an aircraft with it.

== See also ==
- Ayaks
- Black triangle (UFO)
- Blackstar (spacecraft)
- "Deep Throat" (The X-Files episode)
- Lockheed Martin SR-72
- F-19
- Darkstar (fictional aircraft)
- Convair Kingfish

== Bibliography ==
- DeBrosse, Jim. "Unusual vapor trail causes speculation" Archived 14 November 2010 at the Wayback Machine. Dayton Daily News, 8 January 2007. Retrieved: 29 April 2010.
- Peebles, Curtis. Dark Eagles: A History of Top Secret U.S. Aircraft Programs. Novato, CA: Presidio Press, 1999. ISBN 0-89141-623-4.
- Rich, Ben R.; Janos, Leo (1996), Skunk Works: A Personal Memoir of My Years of Lockheed (First ed.), Boston: Little, Brown & Company, ISBN 978-0-316-74300-6
- Rose, Bill. Secret Projects: Military Space Technology. Hinckley, England: Midland Publishing, 2008. ISBN 978-1-85780-296-2.
- Sweetman, Bill. "Aurora – is Mach 5 a reality?" Interavia Aerospace Review, November 1990, pp. 1019–1010.
- Sweetman, Bill. Aurora: The Pentagon's Secret Hypersonic Spyplane. St. Paul, Minnesota: Motorbooks International, 1993. ISBN 0-87938-780-7.
- "UFO files: secret US spy plane Aurora could be behind sightings" Archived 21 February 2018 at the Wayback Machine. The Daily Telegraph, 17 August 2009. Retrieved: 29 April 2010.
- Yenne, Bill. "Chapter 10: Stealth Aircraft", in Secret Weapons of the Cold War: From the H-Bomb to SDI. New York: Berkley Publishing Group, 2005. ISBN 0-425-20149-X.
- Cenciotti, David. "B-2 Spirit or new mysterious stealth plane? New image of triangular shaped plane emerges" Archived 18 April 2014 at the Wayback Machine. The Aviationist, 17 April 2014. Retrieved: 19 April 2014.
