= Papoose Lake =

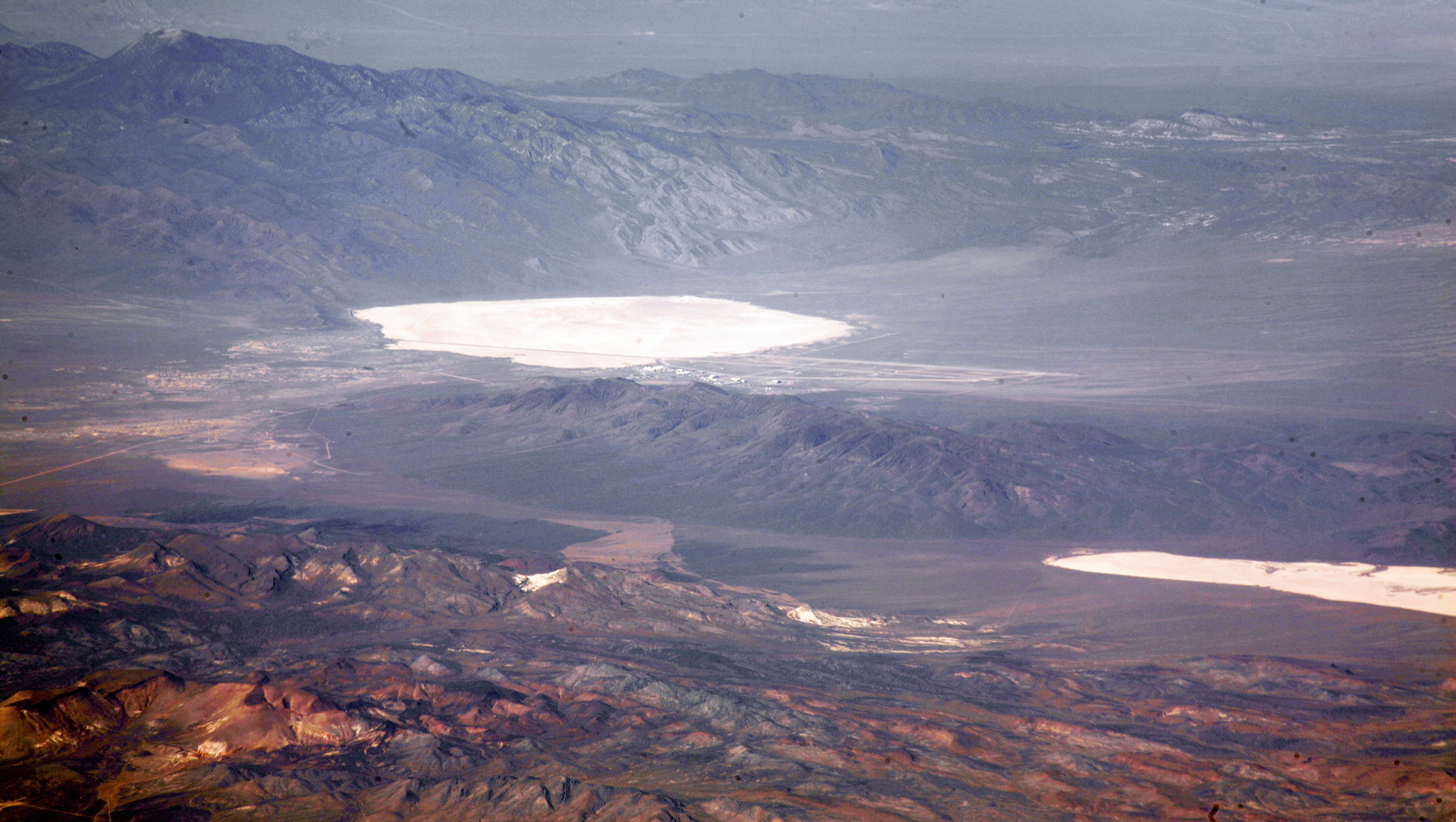

- Location in Nevada
- Location: Lincoln County, Nevada, U.S.
- Coordinates: 37°15′N 115°49′W
- Type: Dry lake bed

Papoose Lake is a dry lake bed located in Lincoln County, Nevada, U.S. The lake lies within the plot of land referred to as the Groom Lake facility (also known as Area 51) and is a restricted area. The lake is located a few miles southwest of the Groom Lake facility adjacent to the Papoose Range.
