= Bruce Burgess =

British film director

- Occupation: filmmaker
- Years active: 1987–present

Bruce Burgess is a documentary filmmaker. Burgess has written, directed and hosted a series of documentary specials that relate to conspiracy theory and fringe theory subject matters like Bigfoot, the Bermuda Triangle, the mummified corpse of Mary Magdalene in France, ancient history, alien abductions, as well as on the British Royal family, paranormal claims, CIA assassinations and global terrorism.

== Career ==
Born in London in 1968, Burgess studied at Hill House School in London, then Harrow School. He started a charity in 1986, EDUCAID, raising money through schools for Bob Geldof's Band Aid Trust.

From 1988 to 1990 he worked for BreakMarketing, an innovative youth marketing company operating out of the offices of Harvey Goldsmith Entertainments, working on promotion, marketing and sponsorship. While at Breakmarketing he helped to produce Peter Boizot's Soho Jazz Festival, and worked on the launch events and promotion of the London Daily News for Robert Maxwell.

From 1990 to 1993 he was asked to be managing director of Unique Public Relations in London, representing major clients from both the UK and US.

From 1993 to 1999, he was Chairman of Transmedia Productions, an independent production company.

In 1996 Burgess created the London Restaurant Awards, which later became the ITV London Restaurant Awards. In 1998 Burgess founded the first London Restaurant Week with American Express and The London Tourist Board.

In 1998 Burgess was asked to become a media adviser to the Conservative Party by William Hague.

In 2002 Burgess formed a Los Angeles-based production company, Bluebook Films, with René Barnett, and in 2004 wrote and directed his first 35 mm short film Rosbeef which premiered "out of competition" at the Cannes Film Festival. Burgess and Barnett also worked together on the 2008 film Bloodline.

A multi-DVD set of broadcasts directed by Burgess was released in 2013. It dealt with controversial matters such the lost treasure of the Templars, the bloodline of Christ, the Holy Grail and secret Nazi UFOs.

== Awards ==
Burgess' film on Area 51, Dreamland was voted best documentary by UFO Magazine in 1998, and top of the 'viewers choice poll' of TLC Channel in 2003.

== Criticism ==
Burgess directed the documentary Dreamland (a Transmedia and Dandelion Production for Sky Television, 1996) an alleged exposé of the secret Pentagon facility known as Area 51, that was described as an example of uncritical reporting:

"...infuriating nonsense to mark the 50th anniversary of the crash at Roswell, New Mexico. The usual suspects are rounded up to tow their party lines (Stanton Friedman, Bob Lazar, et al.) and producer/director/would be intrepid presenter Bruce Burgess does absolutely nothing to question what he's being told or even point out the idiocy of some of the arguments."

== Filmography ==
- Rosbeef (2004), writer/director
- Bloodline (2008), writer/director

== Television ==
- The Restaurant Show (1993), director
- Raw 94 (1994), director
- The Cattle Files (1997), director
- The Uninvited (1997), director
- Impact Earth (1996), director
- William: The Making of a King (1996), director
- Dreamland (1996), director
- The Royal Soap Opera (1997), director
- The Lost Ark (1997), director
- Bulletcatchers (1998), director
- Crossing the Line-Sabina’s Story (1998), director
- Rocket Men (1999), director
- Raising the Titanic (1999), director
- Broken Dagger (2000), director
- William: A King in Waiting (2000), director
- The Real Jack the Ripper (2000), director
- The Bermuda Triangle Solved (2001), director
- Bombs & Basques – In the Firing Line (2001), director
- Network of Terror (2001), director
- Bigfootville (2002), director
- In Search of the Holy Grail (2003), director
- Desert Blast (2003), director
- The Ark of the Covenant Revealed (2004), director
- The Secret Life of Uri Geller (documentary, 2013), producer
- The Lost Treasure of The Templars (Forbidden History, 1:1, 2013) writer/director (shown on Yesterday channel)
- The Third Secret of Fatima (Forbidden History, 1:2, 2013) writer/director
- The Bloodline of Christ (Forbidden History, 1:3, 2013) writer/director
- The Mystery of the Giants (Forbidden History, 1:4, 2013) writer/director with the collaboration of the reporter Marcello Polastri.
- The Treasure of Solomon (Forbidden History, 1:5, 2013) writer/director
- The Secrets of the Alchemists (Forbidden History, 1:6, 2013) writer/director
- History's Ultimate Spies (2014), director
- The Genius of Nikola Tesla (Forbidden History, 2:6, 2015) writer/director
- Top Secret Nazi UFOS (Forbidden History, 2:5, 2015) writer/director
- The Oracles (Forbidden History, 2:4, 2015) writer/director
- The Illuminati (Forbidden History, 2:3, 2015) writer/director
- The Holy Grail (Forbidden History, 2:2, 2015) writer/director
- The Lost Treasures of Petra (Forbidden History, 2:1, 2015) writer/director
- In Search of the real King Arthur (Forbidden History, 3:6, 2016) writer/director
- Inside The Cult of Satan (Forbidden History, 3:5, 2016) writer/director
- Bloodlust: Real Vampires (Forbidden History, 3:4, 2016) writer/director
- The Man In The Iron Mask (Forbidden History, 3:3, 2016) writer/director
- Hitler: Suicide or Survivor? (Forbidden History, 3:2, 2016) writer/director
- The Real Ark of the Covenant (Forbidden History, 3:1, 2016) writer/director
- Can we Time Travel? (documentary, in development)
- The Scole Experiment (two-part documentary, in development)
- What Happens when we die? (television series, in development)
- The Jesus Conspiracy (television series, in development)
- The Shadow Men (television series, in development)
- The Secret Nazis (television series, in development)
- Dark Water (television series, in development)
- Holy Relics (in development)
- The Forbidden Archaeologist (documentary film, in development)
- Return to Abydos (film, in development)
- The Main Course (scripted feature film, in development)
- Meet the Cha Cha's (television series, in development)
