= Area 51 =

U.S. Air Force facility in Nevada, U.S.

Homey Airport
- Near Rachel, Lincoln County, Nevada in United States
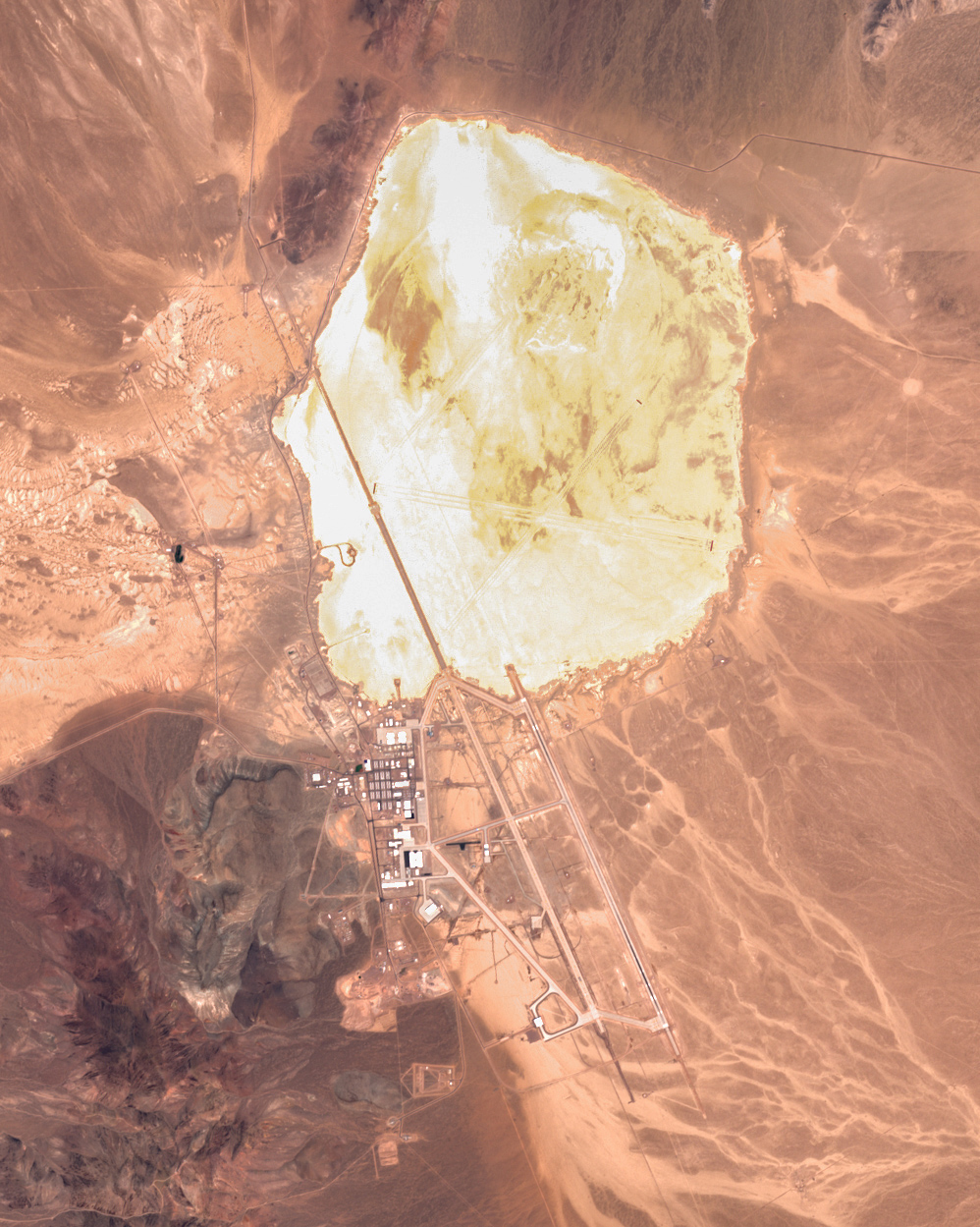
- A satellite image taken in 2022 captured by Sentinel-2 of ESA showing the base with Groom Lake just to the north-northeast

Site information
- Type: Development and testing facility
- Owner: Department of Defense
- Operator: United States Air Force
- Controlled by: Air Force Materiel Command
- Condition: Operational

Location
- Location in the United States
- Coordinates: 37°14′0″N 115°48′30″W

Site history
- Built: 1955 (as Paradise Ranch)
- In use: 1955–present
- Events: Storm Area 51 (2019)

Garrison information
- Garrison: Air Force Test Center (Detachment 3)

Airfield information
- Identifiers: ICAO: KXTA, FAA LID: XTA
- Elevation: 4,494 feet (1,370 m) AMSL
Runways
| Direction | Length and surface |
|---|---|
| 14L/32R | 3,657 metres (11,998 ft) asphalt |
| 12/30 (Note: Part of a taxiway can be temporarily used as a runway if announced by NOTAM.) | 1,652 metres (5,420 ft) paved |
| 09L/27R | 3,470 metres (11,385 ft) dry lake |
| 09R/27L | 3,470 metres (11,385 ft) dry lake |
| 03L/21R | 3,048 metres (10,000 ft) dry lake |
| 03R/21L | 3,048 metres (10,000 ft) dry lake |

Area 51 is a highly classified United States Air Force (USAF) facility within the Nevada Test and Training Range in southern Nevada, 83 miles (134 km) north-northwest of Las Vegas.

A remote detachment administered by Edwards Air Force Base, the facility is officially called Homey Airport (ICAO: KXTA, FAA LID: XTA) or Groom Lake (after the salt flat next to its airfield). Details of its operations are not made public, but the USAF says that it is an open training range, and it is commonly thought to support the development and testing of experimental aircraft and weapons. The USAF and U.S. Central Intelligence Agency (CIA) acquired the site in 1955, primarily for flight tests of the Lockheed U-2 aircraft.

All research and occurrences in Area 51 are Top Secret/Sensitive Compartmented Information (TS/SCI). The CIA publicly acknowledged the base's existence on 25 June 2013, through a Freedom of Information Act (FOIA) request filed in 2005; it has declassified documents detailing its history and purpose. The intense secrecy surrounding the base has made it the frequent subject of conspiracy theories and a central component of unidentified flying object (UFO) folklore.

The surrounding area is a popular tourist destination, including the small town of Rachel along the so-called "Extraterrestrial Highway".

== Geography ==
=== Area 51 ===
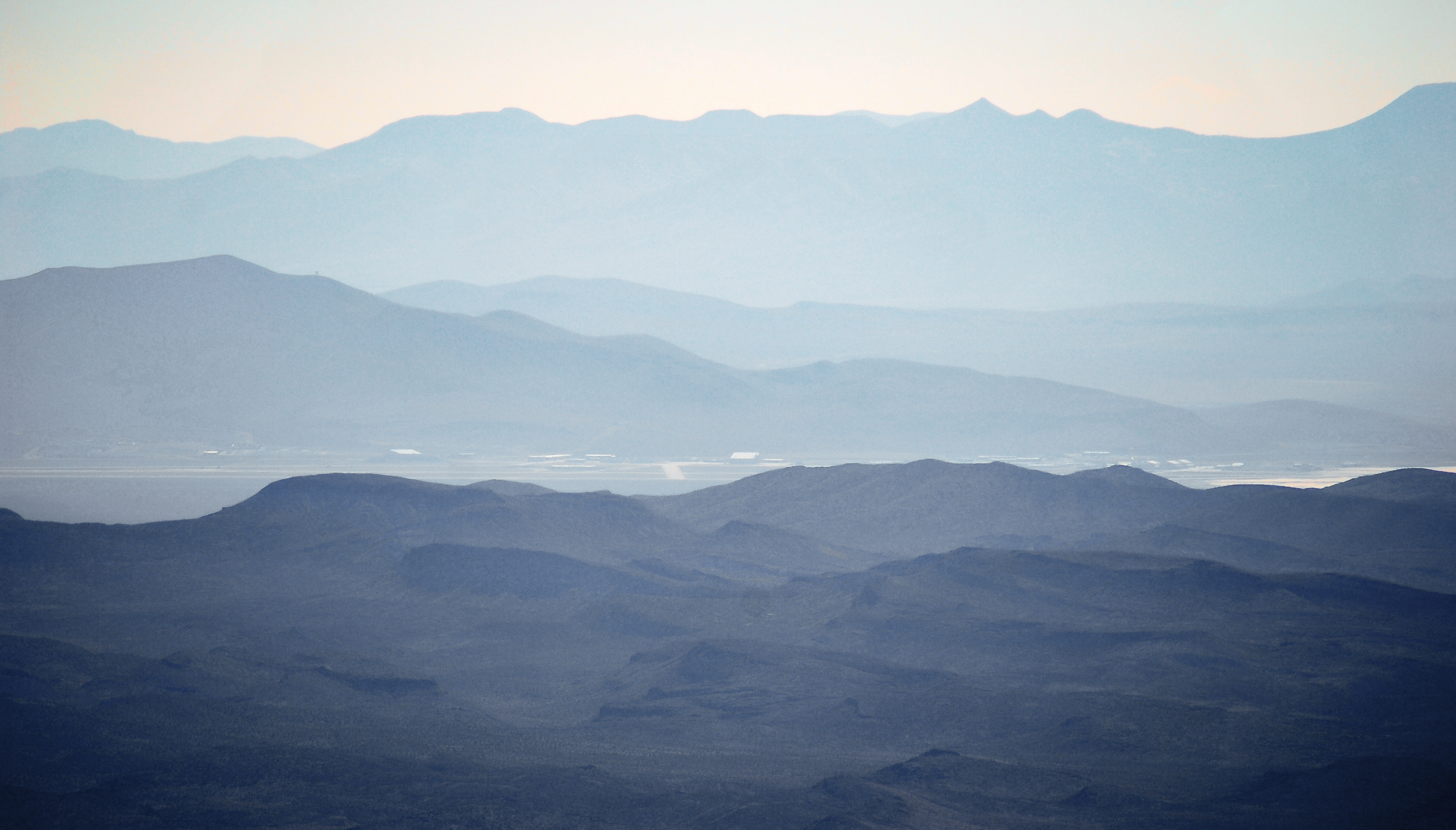
Area 51 viewed from distant Tikaboo Peak

The original rectangular base of 6 by 10 miles (10 by 16 km) is part of the "Groom box", a rectangle of restricted airspace measuring 23 by 25 miles (37 by 40 km). The area is connected to the internal Nevada Test Site (NTS) road network, with paved roads leading south to Mercury and west to the NTS's Yucca Flat region. Leading northeast from the lake, the wide and well-maintained Groom Lake Road runs through a pass in the Jumbled Hills. The road formerly led to mines in the Groom basin; it has been improved since their closure. It winds past a security checkpoint; the restricted area around the base extends farther east. After leaving the restricted area, Groom Lake Road descends eastward to the floor of the Tikaboo Valley, passing the dirt-road entrances to several small ranches before converging with State Route 375, the "Extraterrestrial Highway", south of Rachel.

Area 51 shares a border with Yucca Flat, the location of 739 of the 928 nuclear tests conducted at NTS by the United States Department of Energy. The Yucca Mountain nuclear waste repository is southwest of Groom Lake.

=== Groom Lake ===
Groom Lake is a salt flat in Nevada used as runways by the Nellis Bombing Range Test Site airport (XTA/KXTA) on the north side of Area 51. The lake sits 25 mi (40 km) south of Rachel, Nevada, in the namesake Groom Lake Valley portion of the Tonopah Basin. Some 4,409 ft (1,344 m) above sea level, it is about 3 3/4 mi (6 km) from north to south and 3 mi (5 km) from east to west at its widest point.

== History ==
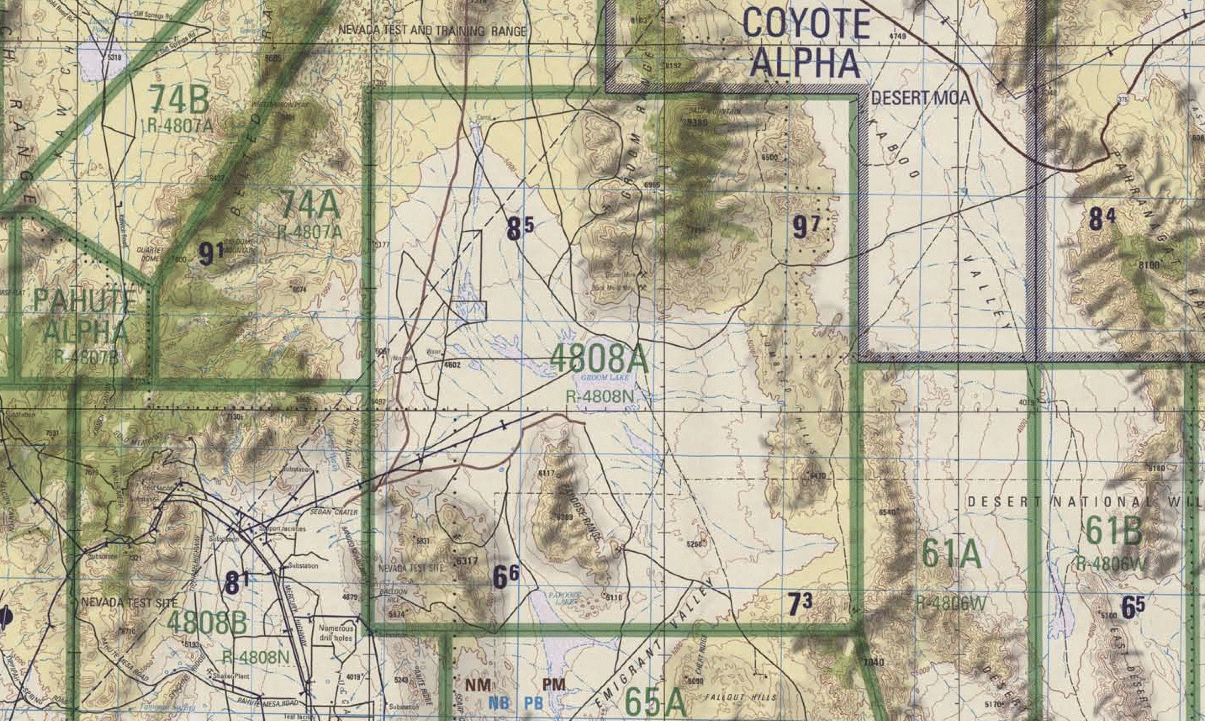
Nevada Test Range topographic chart centered on Groom Lake

The origin of the name "Area 51" is unclear. It is believed to be from an Atomic Energy Commission (AEC) numbering grid, although Area 51 is not part of this system; it is next to Area 15. Another explanation is that 51 was used because it was unlikely that the AEC would use the number. According to the Central Intelligence Agency (CIA), the facility is called Homey Airport (XTA/KXTA) and Groom Lake, though the name "Area 51" was used in a CIA document from the Vietnam War. Nicknames for the facility include "Paradise Ranch" and "Dreamland"; the latter is the approach control call sign for the surrounding area. Air Force public relations has referred to the facility as "an operating location near Groom Dry Lake". The special use airspace around the field is referred to as Restricted Area 4808 North (R-4808N).

Lead and silver were discovered in the southern part of the Groom Range in 1864, and the English company Groome Lead Mines Limited financed the Conception Mines in the 1870s, giving the district its name (nearby mines included Maria, Willow, and White Lake). J. B. Osborne and partners acquired controlling interest in Groom in 1876, and Osborne's son acquired it in the 1890s. Mining continued until 1918, then resumed after World War II and continued until the early 1950s.

The airfield on the Groom Lake site opened in 1942 as Indian Springs Air Force Auxiliary Field with two unpaved 5,000-foot (1,524 m) runways.

=== U-2 program ===
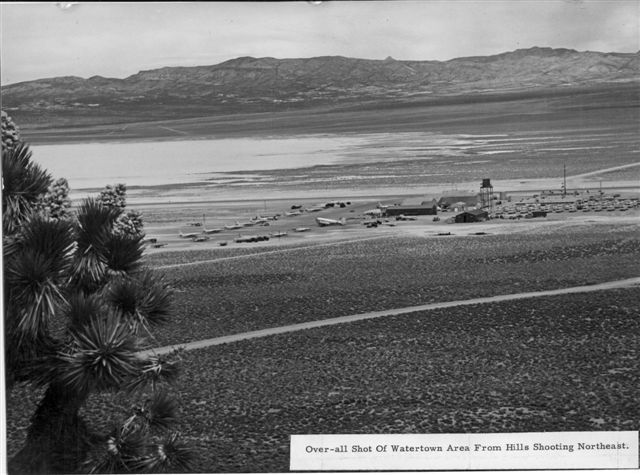
"The Ranch" with U-2 flight line ca. 1957

The Central Intelligence Agency (CIA) established the Groom Lake test facility in April 1955 for Project AQUATONE: the development of the Lockheed U-2 strategic reconnaissance aircraft. Project director Richard M. Bissell Jr. understood that the flight test and pilot training programs could not be conducted at Edwards Air Force Base or Lockheed's Palmdale facility, given the extreme secrecy surrounding the project. He conducted a search for a suitable testing site for the U-2 under the same extreme security as the rest of the project. He notified Lockheed, who sent an inspection team to Groom Lake. According to Lockheed's U-2 designer Kelly Johnson:

We flew over it and within thirty seconds, you knew that was the place [...] it was right by a dry lake. Man alive, we looked at that lake, and we all looked at each other. It was another Edwards, so we wheeled around, landed on that lake, taxied up to one end of it. It was a perfect natural landing field [...] as smooth as a billiard table without anything being done to it.

The lake bed made an ideal strip for testing aircraft, and the Emigrant Valley's mountain ranges and the NTS perimeter protected the site from visitors; it was about 100 mi (160 km) north of Las Vegas. The CIA asked the AEC to acquire the land, designated "Area 51" on the map, and to add it to the Nevada Test Site.

Johnson named the area "Paradise Ranch" to encourage workers to move to "the new facility in the middle of nowhere", as the CIA later described it, and the name became shortened to "the Ranch". On 4 May 1955, a survey team arrived at Groom Lake and laid out a 5,000-foot (1,500 m) north–south runway on the southwest corner of the lakebed and designated a site for a base support facility. The Ranch initially consisted of little more than a few shelters, workshops, and trailer homes in which to house its small team. A little over three months later, the base consisted of a single paved runway, three hangars, a control tower, and rudimentary accommodations for test personnel. The base's few amenities included a movie theater and volleyball court. There was also a mess hall, several wells, and fuel storage tanks. CIA, Air Force, and Lockheed personnel began arriving by July 1955. The Ranch received its first U-2 delivery on 24 July 1955 from Burbank, California on a C-124 Globemaster II cargo plane, accompanied by Lockheed technicians on a Douglas DC-3. Regular Military Air Transport Service flights were set up between Area 51 and Lockheed's offices in Burbank, California. To preserve secrecy, personnel flew to Nevada on Monday mornings and returned to California on Friday evenings.

=== OXCART program ===
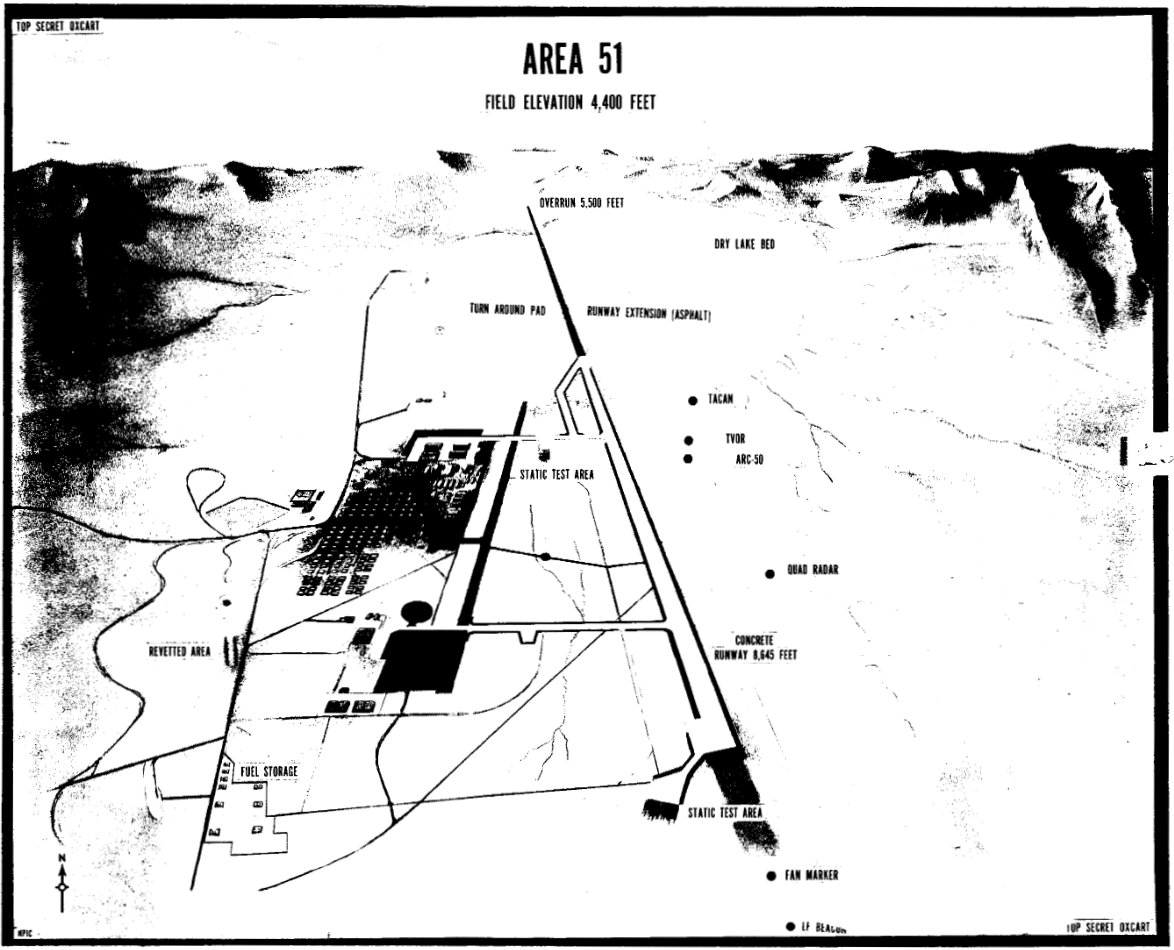
A 1966 Central Intelligence Agency (CIA) diagram of Area 51, found in an untitled, declassified paper, showing the runway overrun for OXCART (Lockheed A-12) and the turnaround areas (CIA / CREST RDP90b00184r000100040001-4)

Project OXCART was established in August 1959 for "antiradar studies, aerodynamic structural tests, and engineering designs" and all later work on the Lockheed A-12. This included testing at Groom Lake, which had inadequate facilities consisting of buildings for only 150 people, a 5,000 ft (1,500 m) asphalt runway, and limited fuel, hangar, and shop space. Groom Lake had received the name "Area 51" when A-12 test facility construction began in September 1960, including a new 8,500 ft (2,600 m) runway to replace the existing runway.

Reynolds Electrical and Engineering Company (REECo) began construction of "Project 51" on 1 October 1960 with double-shift construction schedules. The contractor upgraded base facilities and built a new 10,000 ft (3,000 m) runway (14/32) diagonally across the southwest corner of the lakebed. They marked an Archimedean spiral on the dry lake approximately two miles (three kilometers) across so that an A-12 pilot approaching the end of the overrun could abort instead of plunging into the sagebrush. Area 51 pilots called it "The Hook". For crosswind landings, they marked two unpaved airstrips (runways 9/27 and 03/21) on the dry lakebed.

By August 1961, construction of the essential facilities was complete; three surplus Navy hangars were erected on the base's north side while hangar 7 was new construction. The original U-2 hangars were converted to maintenance and machine shops. Facilities in the main cantonment area included workshops and buildings for storage and administration, a commissary, a control tower, a fire station, and housing. The Navy also contributed more than 130 surplus Babbitt duplex housing units for long-term occupancy facilities. Older buildings were repaired, and additional facilities were constructed as necessary. A reservoir pond surrounded by trees served as a recreational area one mile (1.5 kilometers) north of the base. Other recreational facilities included a gymnasium, a movie theater, and a baseball diamond. A permanent aircraft fuel tank farm was constructed by early 1962 for the special JP-7 fuel required by the A-12. Seven tanks were constructed, with a total capacity of 1,320,000 U.S. gallons (5,000,000 liters).

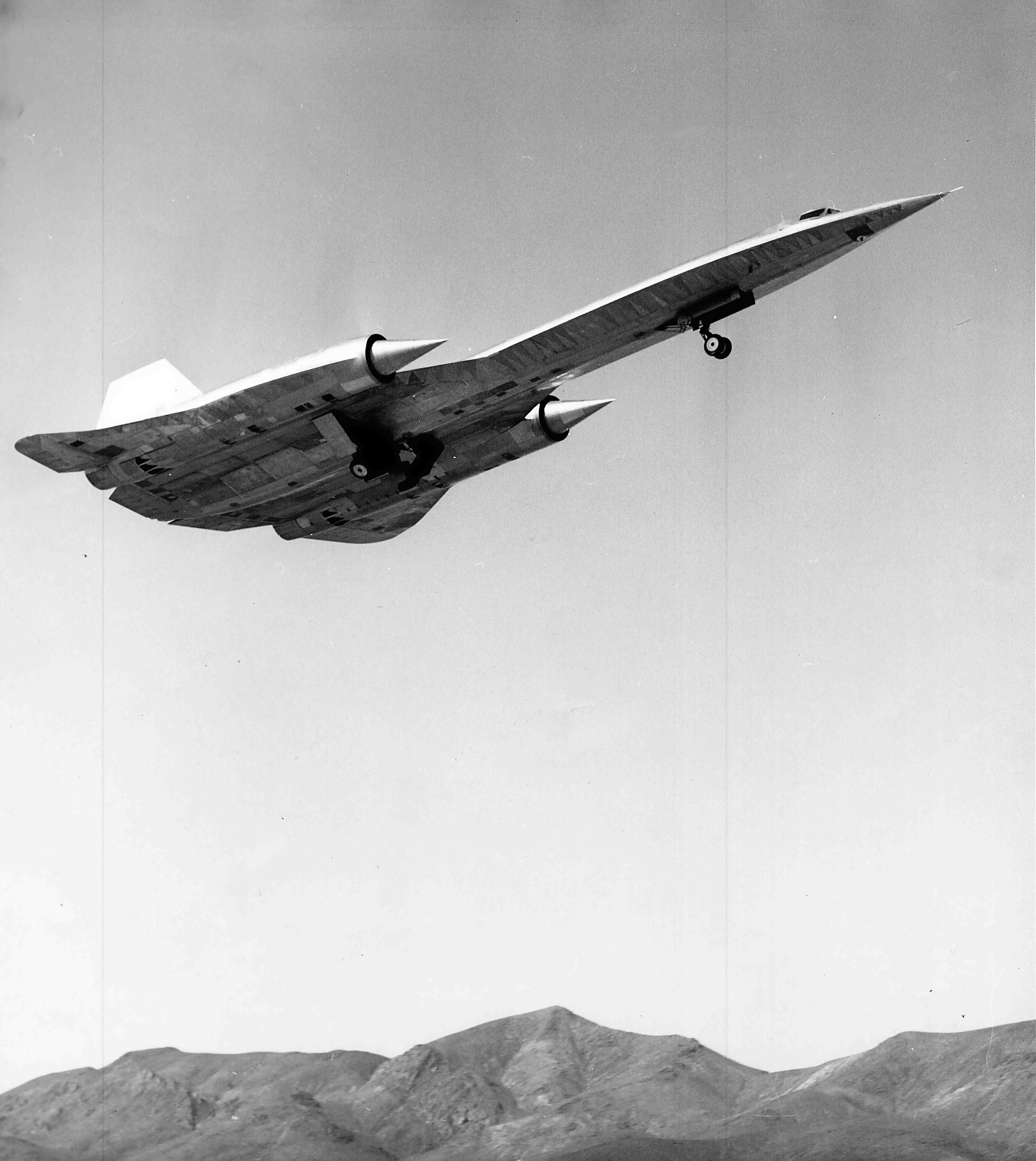
An A-12 (60-6924) takes off from Groom Lake during one of the first test flights, piloted by Louis Schalk, 26 April 1962.

Security was enhanced for the arrival of OXCART and the small mine was closed in the Groom basin. In January 1962, the U.S. Federal Aviation Administration (FAA) expanded the restricted airspace in the vicinity of Groom Lake, and the lakebed became the center of a 600-square-mile (1,600-square-kilometer) addition to restricted area R-4808N. The CIA facility received eight USAF F-101 Voodoos for training, two T-33 Shooting Star trainers for proficiency flying, a C-130 Hercules for cargo transport, a U-3A for administrative purposes, a helicopter for search and rescue, a Cessna 180 for liaison use, and Lockheed provided an F-104 Starfighter for use as a chase plane.

The first A-12 test aircraft was covertly trucked from Burbank on 26 February 1962 and arrived at Groom Lake on 28 February. It made its first flight 26 April 1962 when the base had over 1,000 personnel. The closed airspace above Groom Lake was within the Nellis Air Force Range airspace, and pilots saw the A-12 20 to 30 times. Groom was also the site of the first Lockheed D-21 drone test flight on 22 December 1964. By the end of 1963, nine A-12s were at Area 51, assigned to the CIA-operated "1129th Special Activities Squadron".

=== D-21 Tagboard ===
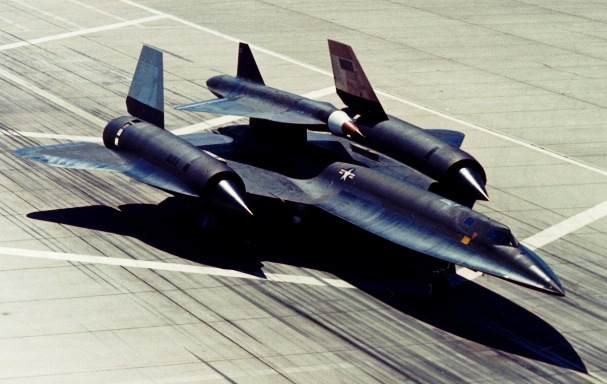
The D-21 mounted on the back of the M-21. Note the intake cover on the drone, which was used on early flights.

After the loss of Gary Powers' U-2 over the Soviet Union, there were several discussions about using the A-12 OXCART as an unpiloted drone aircraft. Although Kelly Johnson had come to support the idea of drone reconnaissance, he opposed the development of an A-12 drone, contending that the aircraft was too large and complex for such a conversion. However, the Air Force agreed to fund the study of a high-speed, high-altitude drone aircraft in October 1962. The service's interest seems to have moved the CIA to take action, and the project was designated Q-12. By October 1963, the drone's design had been finalized. Its name was changed as well, to D-21, to distinguish it from other A-12-based projects. "Tagboard" was the project's code name.

Lockheed completed the first D-21 in spring 1964. After four months of checkouts and static tests, the aircraft was shipped to Groom Lake and reassembled. It was to be carried by the M-21, a two-seat derivative of the A-12. When the D-21/M-21 reached the launch point, the first step would be to blow off the D-21's inlet and exhaust covers. With the D-21/M-21 at the correct speed and altitude, the LCO would start the ramjet and the other systems of the D-21. "With the D-21's systems activated and running, and the launch aircraft at the correct point, the M-21 would begin a slight pushover, the LCO would push a final button, and the D-21 would come off the pylon".

Technical problems occupied the D-21 team at Groom Lake in 1964 and 1965, including aerodynamic difficulties revealed by captive flights. By late January 1966, more than a year after the first captive flight, everything seemed ready. The first D-21 launch came on 5 March 1966: the drone flew 120 miles with limited fuel. In the second D-21 flight, in April 1966, the drone flew 1,200 miles, reaching Mach 3.3 and 90,000 feet. On 30 July 1966, a fully fueled D-21 was launched on what was supposed to be a checkout flight. But the drone suffered an unstart and collided with the M-21 launch aircraft. The two crewmen ejected and landed in the ocean 150 miles offshore. One crew member was picked up by a helicopter, but the other, having survived the aircraft breakup and ejection, drowned when sea water entered his pressure suit. Kelly Johnson personally cancelled the entire program, having had serious doubts about its feasibility from the start.

A number of D-21s had already been produced, and rather than scrapping the whole effort, Johnson again proposed to the Air Force that they be launched from a B-52H bomber. By late summer 1967, the modifications of the D-21 (now designated D-21B) and the B-52Hs were complete. The test program could now resume. The test missions were flown out of Groom Lake, with the actual launches over the Pacific. The first D-21B to be flown was Article 501, the prototype. The first attempt, on 28 September 1967, ended in complete failure. As the B-52 was flying toward the launch point, the D-21B fell off the pylon. The B-52H gave a sharp lurch as the drone fell free. The booster fired and was "quite a sight from the ground". The failure was traced to a stripped nut on the forward right attachment point on the pylon. Several more tests were made, none of which met with success. Time was running out for the D-21B Tagboard drones. The A-12 had finally been allowed to deploy, and the SR-71 was soon to replace it. A new generation of reconnaissance satellites would soon cover not just the Soviet Union but anywhere in the world. The satellites' resolution would be comparable to that of aircraft but without the slightest political risk.

Several more test flights, including two over China, were made from Beale Air Force Base, California, in 1969 and 1970, to varying degrees of success. On 15 July 1971, Kelly Johnson received a wire canceling the D-21B program. The remaining drones were transferred by a C-5A and placed in dead storage. The tooling used to build the D-21Bs was ordered destroyed. Like the A-12 Oxcart, the D-21B remained a black-ops airplane, even in retirement. Its existence was not suspected until August 1976, when the first group was placed in storage at the Davis-Monthan Air Force Base Military Storage and Disposition Center. A second group arrived in 1977. They were labeled "GTD-21Bs" (GT stood for ground training).

Davis-Monthan is an open base, with public tours of the storage area at the time, so the odd-looking drones were soon spotted and photos began appearing in magazines. Speculation about the D-21Bs circulated within aviation circles for years, and it was not until 1982 that details of the Tagboard program were released. Only in 1993 was the B-52/D-21B program made public. That same year, the surviving D-21Bs were released to museums.

=== Foreign technology evaluation ===
Beginning in the late 1960s, and for several decades thereafter, the United States tested and evaluated captured Soviet fighter aircraft at Area 51. This was not a new mission; the Army Air Forces had tested foreign technology during World War II. After the war, testing of acquired foreign technology was performed by the Air Technical Intelligence Center (ATIC, which became influential during the Korean War), under the direct command of the Air Materiel Control Department. In 1961, ATIC became the Foreign Technology Division and was reassigned to Air Force Systems Command. ATIC personnel were sent anywhere that foreign aircraft could be found.

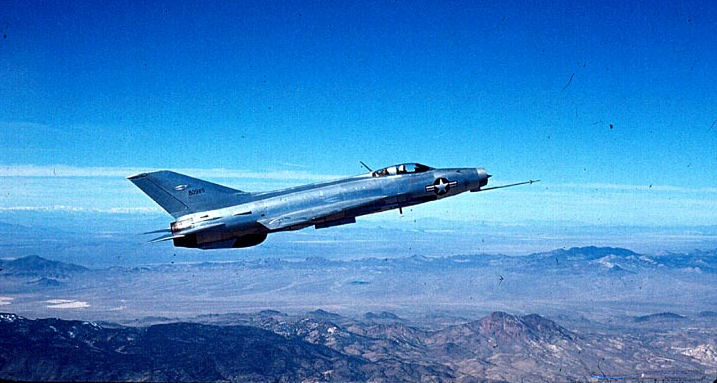
HAVE DOUGHNUT, a MiG-21F-13 flown by United States Navy and Air Force Systems Command during its 1968 exploitation

The focus of Air Force Systems Command limited the use of the fighter as a tool with which to train the service's pilots. The command recruited its pilots from the Air Force Flight Test Center at Edwards Air Force Base, California, who were usually graduates from various test pilot schools. Tactical Air Command selected its pilots primarily from the ranks of the Weapons School graduates.

In August 1966, Iraqi Air Force fighter pilot Captain Munir Redfa defected as part of Operation Diamond of Israel's Mossad, flying his Mikoyan-Gurevich MiG-21 to Israel after being ordered to attack Iraqi Kurd villages with napalm. His aircraft was transferred to Groom Lake in late 1967 for evaluation of its performance, technical, and operational capabilities. Israel loaned the MiG-21 to the USAF from January 1968 to April 1968. In 1968, the USAF and U.S. Navy jointly formed a project known as HAVE DOUGHNUT in which Air Force Systems Command, Tactical Air Command, and the U.S. Navy's Air Test and Evaluation Squadron Four (VX-4) flew this acquired Soviet-made aircraft in simulated air combat training. As U.S. possession of the Soviet MiG-21 was itself secret, it was tested at Groom Lake.

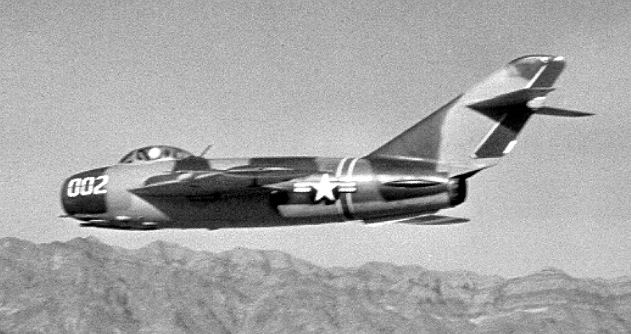
HAVE FERRY, the second of two MiG-17F "Fresco"s loaned to the United States by Israel in 1969

A joint Air Force-Navy team was assembled for a series of dogfight tests. Initial evaluations showed the F-4 and the MiG-21 to be evenly matched. The HAVE DOUGHNUT tests showed that the skill of the man in the cockpit made the difference. When the Navy or Air Force pilots flew the MiG-21, the results were a draw; the F-4 would win some fights, the MiG-21 would win others. There were no clear advantages. The problem was not with the planes, but with the pilots flying them. The pilots would not fly either plane to its limits. One of the Navy pilots was Marland W. "Doc" Townsend, then commander of VF-121, the F-4 training squadron at NAS Miramar. He was an engineer and a Korean War veteran and had flown almost every Navy aircraft. When he flew against the MiG-21, he would outmaneuver it every time. The Air Force pilots would not go vertical in the MiG-21. The HAVE DOUGHNUT project officer was Tom Cassidy, a pilot with VX-4, the Navy's Air Development Squadron at Point Mugu, California. He had been watching as Townsend "waxed" the Air Force MiG-21 pilots. Cassidy climbed into the MiG-21 and went up against Townsend's F-4. This time the result was far different. Cassidy was willing to fight in the vertical, flying the plane to the point where it was buffeting, just above the stall. Cassidy was able to get on the F-4's tail. After the flight, they realized the MiG-21 turned better than the F-4 at lower speeds. The key was for the F-4 to keep its speed up. An F-4 had defeated the MiG-21; the weakness of the Soviet plane had been found. Further test flights confirmed what was learned. It was also clear that the MiG-21 was a formidable enemy. United States pilots would have to fly much better than they had been to beat it. This would require a special school to teach advanced air combat techniques.

On 12 August 1968, two Syrian air force lieutenants, Walid Adham and Radfan Rifai, took off in a pair of MiG-17Fs on a training mission. They lost their way and, believing they were over Lebanon, landed at the Betzet Landing Field in northern Israel. (One version has it that they were led astray by an Arabic-speaking Israeli). By year's end, these MiG-17s were transferred from Israel and added to the Area 51 test fleet; they were given USAF designations and fake serial numbers so that they could be identified in U.S. Department of Defense standard flight logs. As in the earlier program, a small group of Air Force and Navy pilots conducted mock dogfights with the MiG-17s. Instructors from the Navy's new Top Gun school at NAS Miramar, California, were chosen to fly against the MiGs for familiarization purposes. Very soon, the MiG-17's shortcomings became clear. It had an extremely simple, even crude, control system that lacked the power-boosted controls of American aircraft. The F-4's twin engines were so powerful it could accelerate out of range of the MiG-17's guns in thirty seconds. It was important for the F-4 to keep its distance from the MiG-17. As long as the F-4 was one and a half miles from the MiG-17, it was outside the reach of the Soviet fighter's guns, but the MiG was within reach of the F-4's missiles. The data from the HAVE DOUGHNUT and HAVE DRILL tests were provided to the Top Gun school.

By 1970, the HAVE DRILL program was expanded; a few fleet F-4 crews were invited to fight the MiGs. No Navy pilot who flew in the project defeated the MiG-17 Fresco in the first engagement. The other pilots based at Nellis Air Force Base were not to know about the U.S.-operated MiGs. To prevent any sightings, the airspace above the Groom Lake range was closed. On aeronautical maps, the exercise area was marked in red ink. The forbidden zone became known as "Red Square", a tongue-in-cheek reference to Red Square in Moscow.

During the remainder of the Vietnam War, the Navy kill ratio climbed to 8.33 to 1. In contrast, the USAF rate improved only slightly to 2.83 to 1. The reason for this difference was Top Gun. The Navy had revitalized its air combat training, while the Air Force had stayed stagnant. Most of the Navy MiG kills were by Top Gun graduates.

In March 1970 project HAVE GLIB was instituted as an umbrella program for testing of foreign military equipment, inheriting the assets of previous aircraft evaluation projects such as HAVE DOUGHNUT, HAVE FERRY and HAVE DRILL. The Air Force responsible test organisation was designated as the 6512th Test Squadron, of which the Area 51 detachment, the Special Projects Branch, became known as the Red Hats.

HAVE GLIB also incorporated a range of Soviet tracking and missile control radar systems. A complex of actual and replica Soviet-type threat systems began to grow around "Slater Lake", a mile northwest of the main base, along with an acquired Soviet "Barlock" search radar placed at Tonopah Air Force Station. They were arranged to simulate a Soviet-style air defense complex.

In May 1973, the project name HAVE GLIB was superseded by HAVE IDEA.

In April 1977 two MiG-17s and two MiG-21s of HAVE IDEA were transferred to the 4477th Test and Evaluation Flight, the Red Eagles, under project CONSTANT PEG. From this point onwards the Red Hats of Air Force Systems Command continued evaluation of new aircraft types at Area 51 under project HAVE IDEA, while the Red Eagles of Tactical Air Command began an exploitation programme to expose front line squadrons to Soviet-built aircraft under project CONSTANT PEG. For two years the Red Hats and the Red Eagles both operated from Area 51, before the 4477th TEF was transferred to the Tonopah Test Range Airport in July 1979.

Testing of foreign technology aircraft by the Red Hats expanded and continued at Area 51 through the 1970s and 1980s, with the HAVE IDEA project title being replaced by HAVE PHOENIX in April 1986.

The USAF began funding improvements to Area 51 in 1977 under project SCORE EVENT. In 1979, the CIA transferred jurisdiction of the Area 51 site to the Air Force Flight Test Center at Edwards AFB. Sam Mitchell, the last CIA commander of Area 51, relinquished command to USAF Lt. Col. Larry D. McClain.

In 2017, a USAF aircraft crashed at the site, killing the pilot, Lt. Colonel Eric "Doc" Schultz. The USAF refused to release further information about the crash. In 2022, unconfirmed reports said the aircraft was a Sukhoi Su-27 Soviet fighter jet that was part of the classified Foreign Materials Exploitation program, and that Schultz had died when both air crew ejected after a technical problem.

The list of known HAVE projects under which Soviet-built aircraft were evaluated at Area 51 includes:

- HAVE DOUGHNUT: Iraqi MiG-21F-13 (recorded as YF-110B), 1968
- HAVE DRILL: Syrian MiG-17F (PZL-Mielec Lim-5M, recorded as YF-113A), 1969
- HAVE FERRY: Syrian MiG-17F (recorded as YF-114C), 1969
- HAVE GLIB: Umbrella project for exploitation of Soviet hardware at Area 51, including assets from HAVE DOUGHNUT and HAVE FERRY, starting 1970
- HAVE IDEA: Umbrella project replacing HAVE GLIB, starting 1973
- HAVE UP: Egyptian Su-22M, 1978-79
- HAVE PAD: Egyptian MiG-23MS (recorded as YF-113E), 1978
- HAVE BOXER: Egyptian MiG-23BN (recorded as YF-113B), 1979-80
- HAVE LIGHTER: MiG-23ML & MiG-23MLD, 1980-81
- HAVE DOWN: MiG-23ML, 1980
- HAVE COAT: Egyptian MiG-21MF (recorded as YF-110D), 1980
- HAVE FIREMAN: MiG-23UB, 1983
- HAVE PHOENIX: Umbrella project replacing HAVE IDEA, starting 1986. Reported to have included two East German Su22M4 (recorded as YF-112C & YF-112D) from 1993-1998
- HAVE LOAN: East German MiG-29 (recorded as YF-116A), 1991

=== Iran hostage crisis ===
On April 20, 1980, media nationwide reported on "Area 51", described as a "secret sector" where US forces trained to rescue the hostages in Iran.

=== Have Blue/F-117 program ===
The Lockheed Have Blue prototype stealth fighter (a smaller proof-of-concept model of the F-117 Nighthawk) first flew at Groom in December 1977.

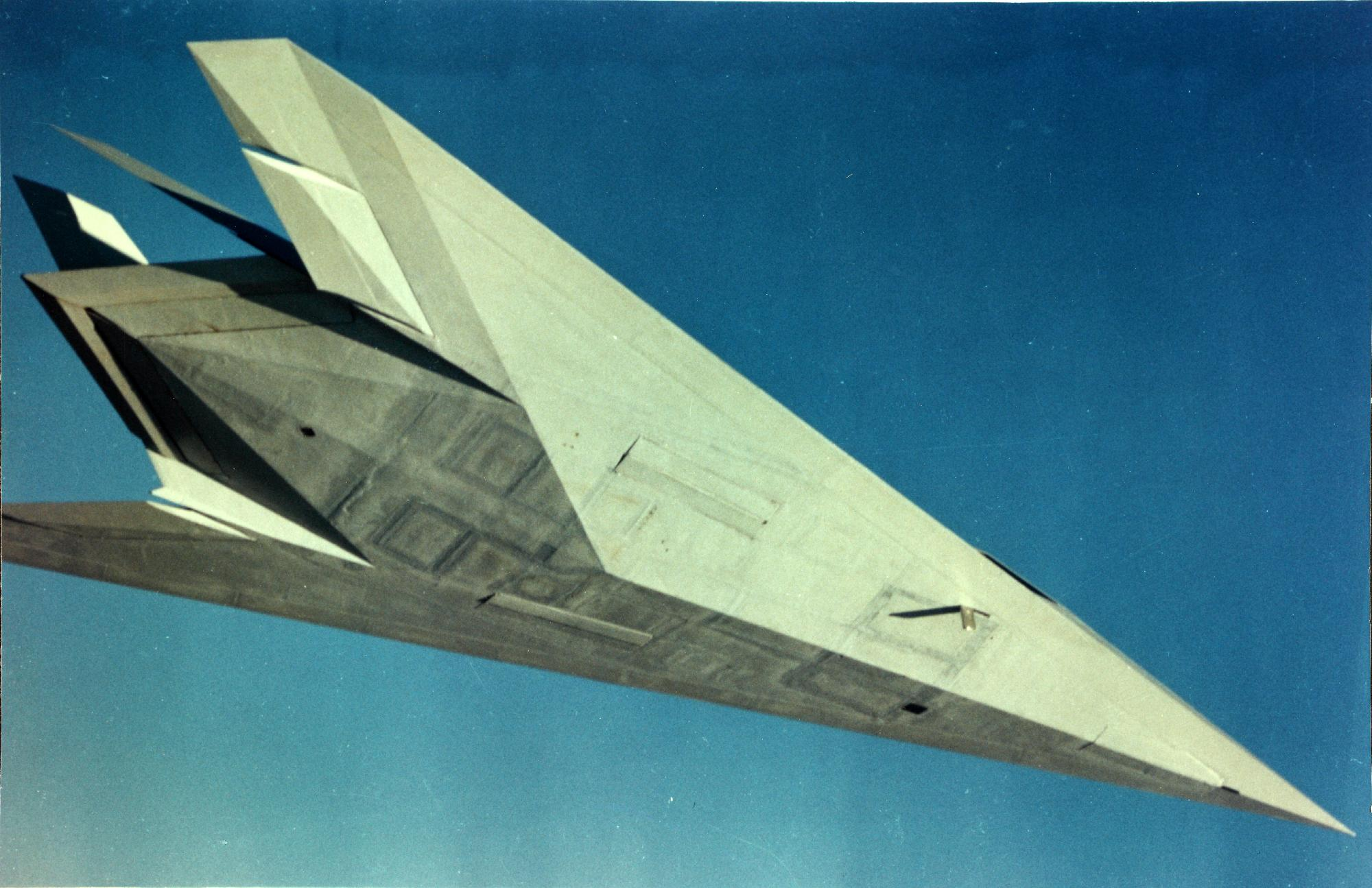
Underside view of Have Blue

In 1978, the Air Force awarded a full-scale development contract for the F-117 to Lockheed Corporation's Advanced Development Projects. On 17 January 1981 the Lockheed test team at Area 51 accepted delivery of the first full-scale development (FSD) prototype 79–780, designated YF-117A. At 6:05 am on 18 June 1981 Lockheed Skunk Works test pilot Hal Farley lifted the nose of YF-117A 79–780 off the runway of Area 51.

Meanwhile, Tactical Air Command (TAC) set up a group-level organization to guide the F-117A to an initial operating capability. That organization became the 4450th Tactical Group (Initially designated "A Unit"), which officially activated on 15 October 1979 at Nellis Air Force Base, Nevada, although the group was physically located at Area 51. The 4450th Tactical Group also operated the A-7D Corsair II as a surrogate trainer for the F-117A, and these operations continued until 15 October 1982 under the guise of an avionics test mission.

Flying squadrons of the 4450th Tactical Group were the 4450th Tactical Squadron (Initially designated "I Unit") activated on 11 June 1981, and 4451st Tactical Squadron (Initially designated "P Unit") on 15 January 1983. The 4450th Tactical Squadron, stationed at Area 51, was the first F-117A squadron, while the 4451st Tactical Squadron was stationed at Nellis Air Force Base and was equipped with A-7D Corsair IIs painted in a dark motif, tail coded "LV". Lockheed test pilots put the YF-117 through its early paces. A-7Ds were used for pilot training before any F-117As had been delivered by Lockheed to Area 51, later the A-7D's were used for F-117A chase testing and other weapon tests at the Nellis Range. On 15 October 1982, Major Alton C. Whitley Jr. became the first USAF 4450th Tactical Group pilot to fly the F-117A.

Although ideal for testing, Area 51 was not a suitable location for an operational group, so a new covert base had to be established for F-117 operations. Tonopah Test Range Airport was selected for operations of the first USAF F-117 unit, the 4450th Tactical Group (TG). From October 1979, the Tonopah Airport base was reconstructed and expanded. The 6,000-foot runway was lengthened to 10,000 feet. Taxiways, a concrete apron, a large maintenance hangar, and a propane storage tank were added.

By early 1982, four more YF-117As were operating at the base. After finding a large scorpion in their offices, the testing team (Designated "R Unit") adopted it as their mascot and dubbed themselves the "Baja Scorpions". Testing of a series of ultra-secret prototypes continued at Area 51 until mid-1981 when testing transitioned to the initial production of F-117 stealth fighters. The F-117s were moved to and from Area 51 by C-5 during darkness to maintain security. The aircraft were defueled, disassembled, cradled, and then loaded aboard a C-5 aircraft at night, flown to Lockheed, and unloaded at night before reassembly and flight testing. Area 51 performed radar profiling, F-117 weapons testing, and training of the first group of frontline USAF F-117 pilots.

While the "Baja Scorpions" were working on the F-117, there was also another group at work in secrecy, known as "the Whalers" working on Tacit Blue. A fly-by-wire technology demonstration aircraft with curved surfaces and composite material, to evade radar, was a prototype, and never went into production. Nevertheless, this strange-looking aircraft was responsible for many of the stealth technology advances that were used on several other aircraft designs, and had a direct influence on the B-2 bomber aircraft; with the first flight of Tacit Blue being performed on 5 February 1982, by Northrop Grumman test pilot, Richard G. Thomas.

Production FSD airframes from Lockheed were shipped to Area 51 for acceptance testing. As the Baja Scorpions tested the aircraft with functional check flights and low observability (L.O.) verification, the operational airplanes were then transferred to the 4450th TG.

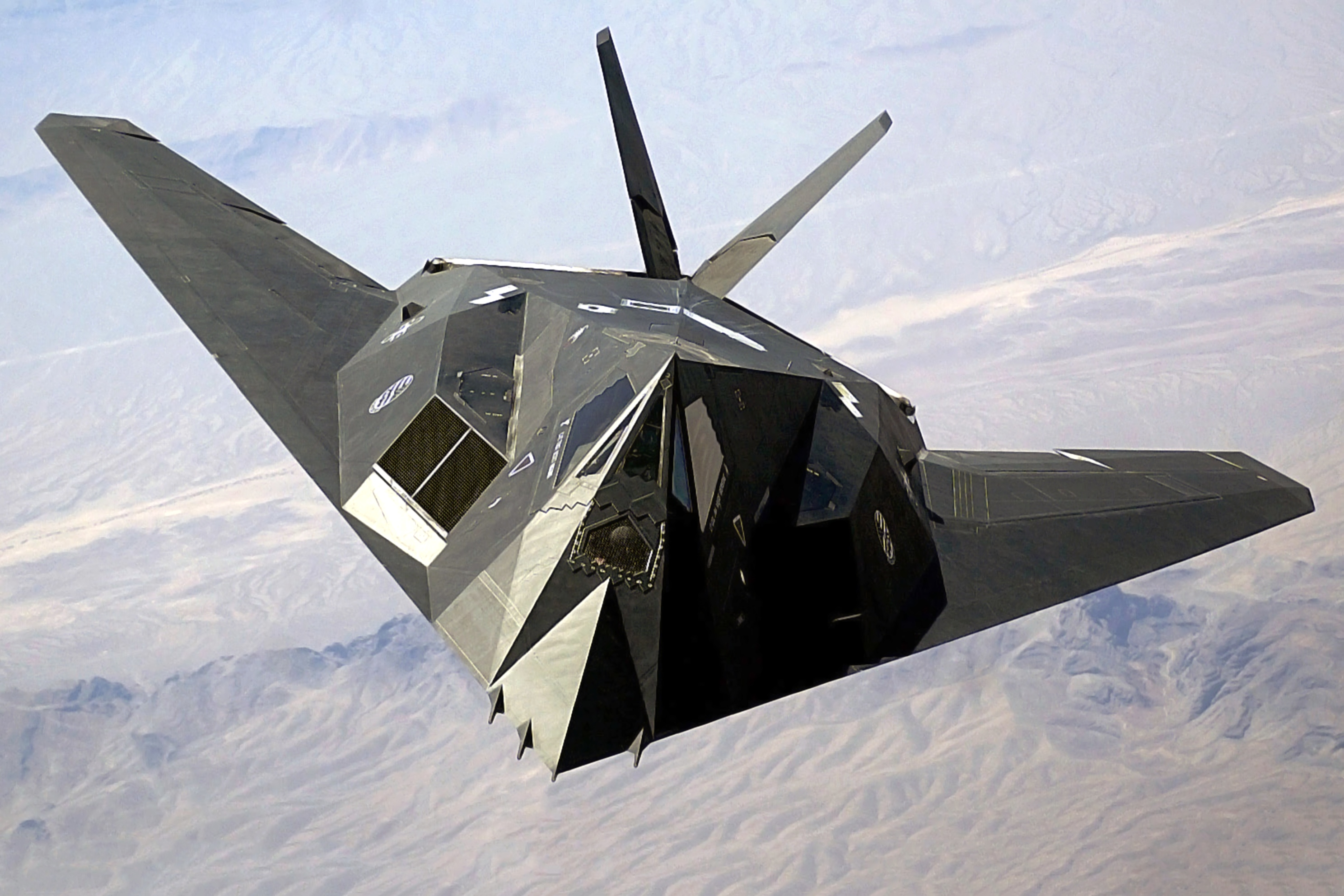
F-117 flying over mountains

On 17 May 1982, the move of the 4450th TG from Groom Lake to Tonopah was initiated, with the final components of the move completed in early 1983. Production FSD airframes from Lockheed were shipped to Area 51 for acceptance testing. As the Baja Scorpions tested the aircraft with functional check flights and L.O. verification, the operational airplanes were then transferred to the 4450th TG at Tonopah.

The R-Unit was inactivated on 30 May 1989. Upon inactivation, the unit was reformed as Detachment 1, 57th Fighter Weapons Wing. In 1990, the last F-117A (843) was delivered from Lockheed. After completion of acceptance flights at Area 51 of this last new F-117A aircraft, the flight test squadron continued flight test duties of refurbished aircraft after modifications by Lockheed. In February/March 1992 the test unit moved from Area 51 to the USAF Palmdale Plant 42 and was integrated with the Air Force Systems Command 6510th Test Squadron. Some testing, especially RCS verification and other classified activity was still conducted at Area 51 throughout the operational lifetime of the F-117. The recently inactivated (2008) 410th Flight Test Squadron traces its roots, if not its formal lineage to the 4450th TG R-unit.

=== Later operations ===
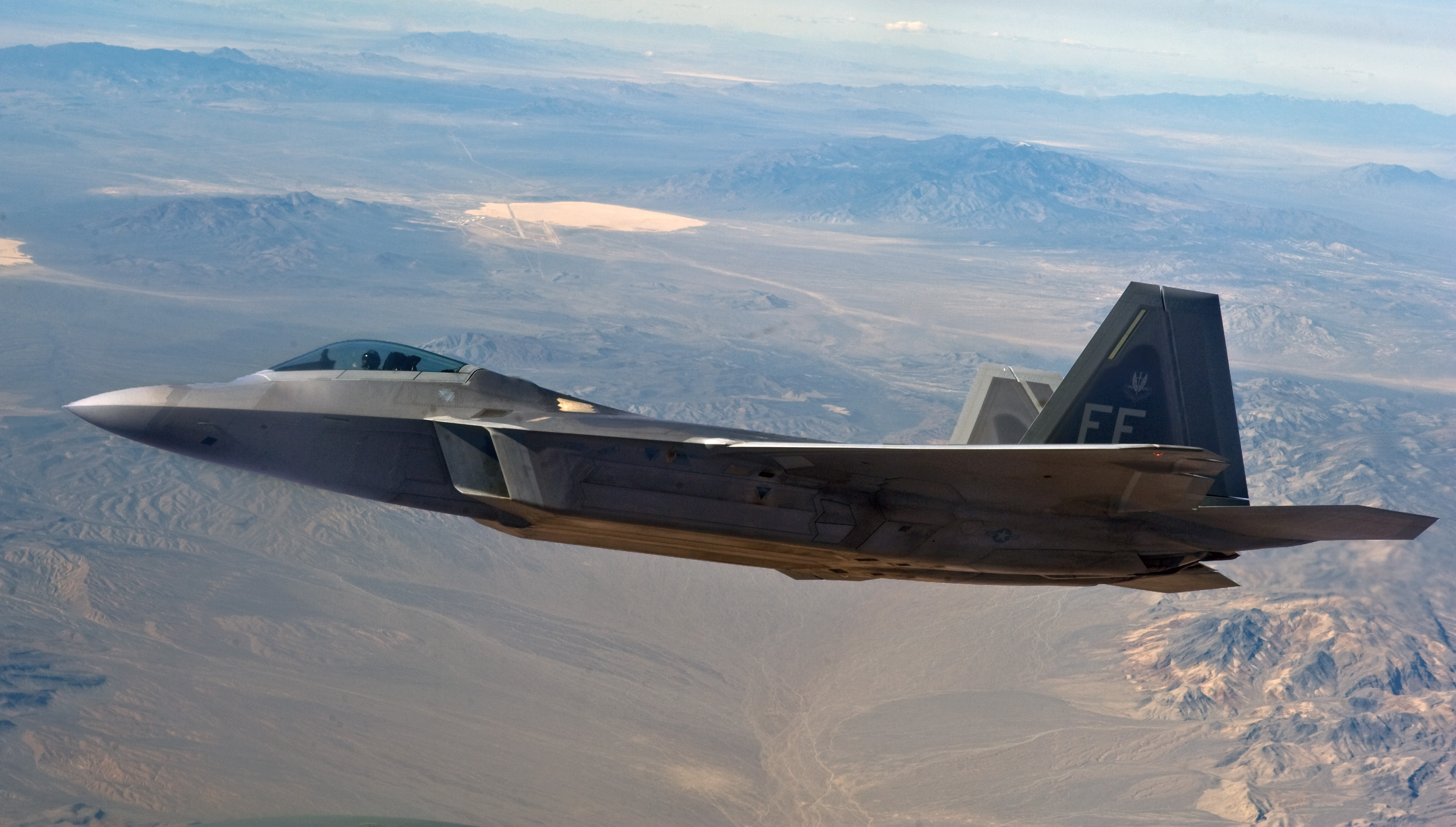
F-22 during a Red Flag exercise with Groom Lake in the background (March 2013)

Since the F-117 became operational in 1983, operations at Groom Lake have continued. The base and its associated runway system were expanded, including the expansion of housing and support facilities. In 1995, the federal government expanded the exclusionary area around the base to include nearby mountains that had hitherto afforded the only reasonable overlook of the base, prohibiting access to 3,972 acres (16.07 km^{2}) of land formerly administered by the U.S. Bureau of Land Management.

== Legal status ==
=== U.S. government's positions on Area 51 ===
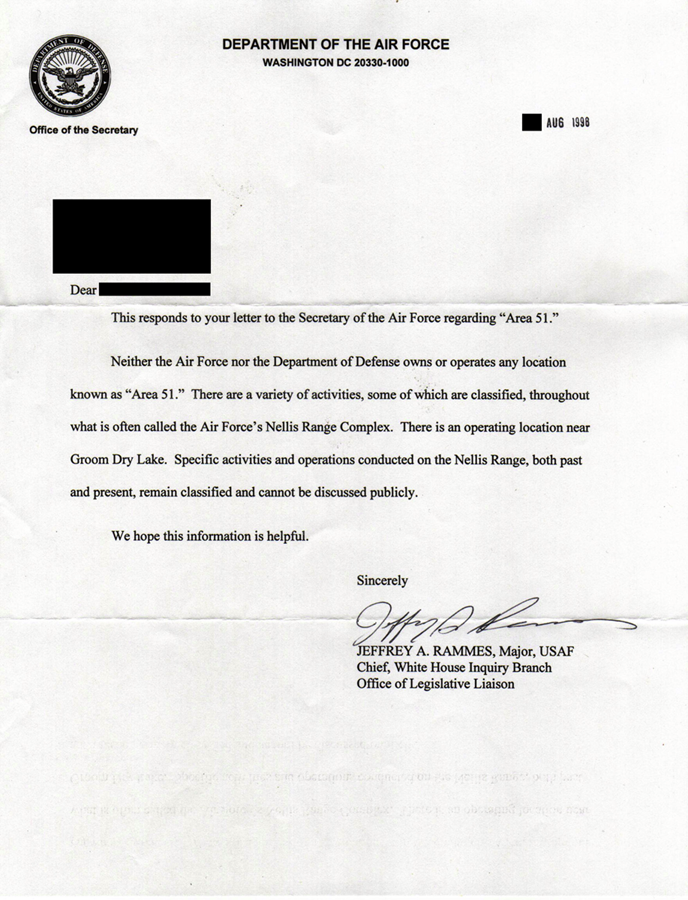
A 1998 letter from the USAF replying to a query about Area 51

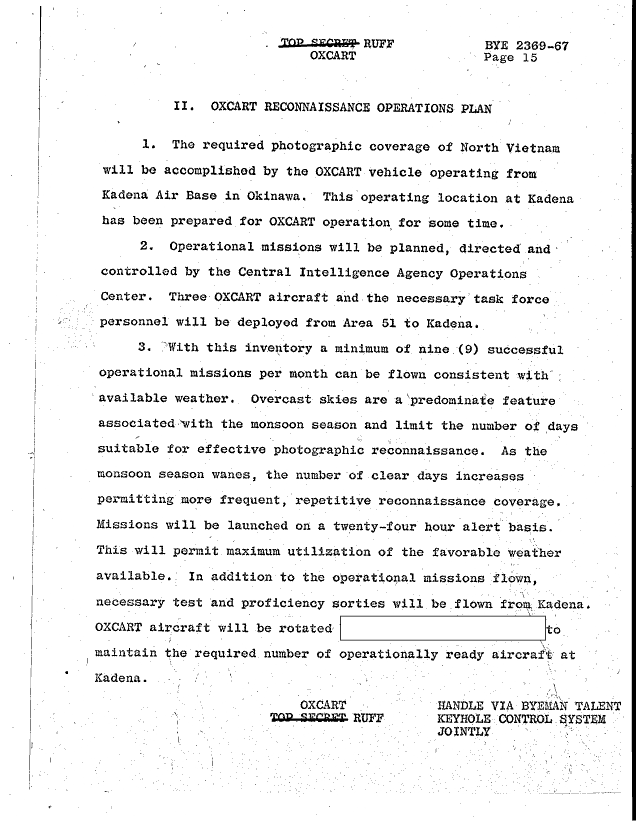
CIA document from 1967 referring to Area 51

The United States government has provided minimal information regarding Area 51. The area surrounding the lake is permanently off-limits to both civilian and normal military air traffic. Security clearances are checked regularly; cameras and weaponry are not allowed. Even military pilots training in the Nevada Test and Training Range risk disciplinary action if they stray into the exclusionary "box" surrounding Groom's airspace. Surveillance is supplemented using buried motion sensors. Area 51 is a common destination for Janet airlines, a small fleet of passenger aircraft operated on behalf of the USAF to transport military personnel, primarily from Harry Reid International Airport.

The United States Geological Survey (USGS) topographic map for the area only shows the long-disused Groom Mine, but USGS aerial photographs of the site in 1959 and 1968 were publicly available. A civil aviation chart published by the Nevada Department of Transportation shows a large restricted area, defined as part of the Nellis Air Force Base restricted airspace. The National Atlas shows the area as lying within the Nellis Air Force Base. There are higher resolution and newer images available from other satellite imagery providers, including Russian providers and the IKONOS. These show the runway markings, base facilities, aircraft, and vehicles.

In 1998, the USAF officially acknowledged the site's existence. On 25 June 2013, the CIA released an official history of the U-2 and OXCART projects which acknowledged that the U-2 was tested at Area 51, in response to a Freedom of Information Act request submitted in 2005 by Jeffrey T. Richelson of George Washington University's National Security Archive. It contains numerous references to Area 51 and Groom Lake, along with a map of the area. Media reports incorrectly stated that releasing the CIA history was the first governmental acknowledgement of Area 51's existence; rather, it was the first official acknowledgement of specific activity at the site.

=== Environmental lawsuit ===
In 1994, five unnamed civilian contractors and the widows of contractors Walter Kasza and Robert Frost sued the USAF and the United States Environmental Protection Agency (EPA). They alleged that they had been present when large quantities of unknown chemicals had been burned in open pits and trenches at Groom. Rutgers University biochemists analyzed biopsies from the complainants and found high levels of dioxin, dibenzofuran, and trichloroethylene in their body fat. The complainants alleged that they had sustained skin, liver, and respiratory injuries due to their work at Groom and that this had contributed to the deaths of Frost and Kasza.

The suit sought compensation for the injuries, claiming that the USAF had illegally handled toxic materials and that the EPA had failed in its duty to enforce the Resource Conservation and Recovery Act which governs the handling of dangerous materials. They also sought detailed information about the chemicals, hoping that this would facilitate the medical treatment of survivors. U.S. Congressman Lee Hamilton, former chairman of the House Intelligence Committee, told 60 Minutes reporter Lesley Stahl, "The Air Force is classifying all information about Area 51 in order to protect themselves from a lawsuit."

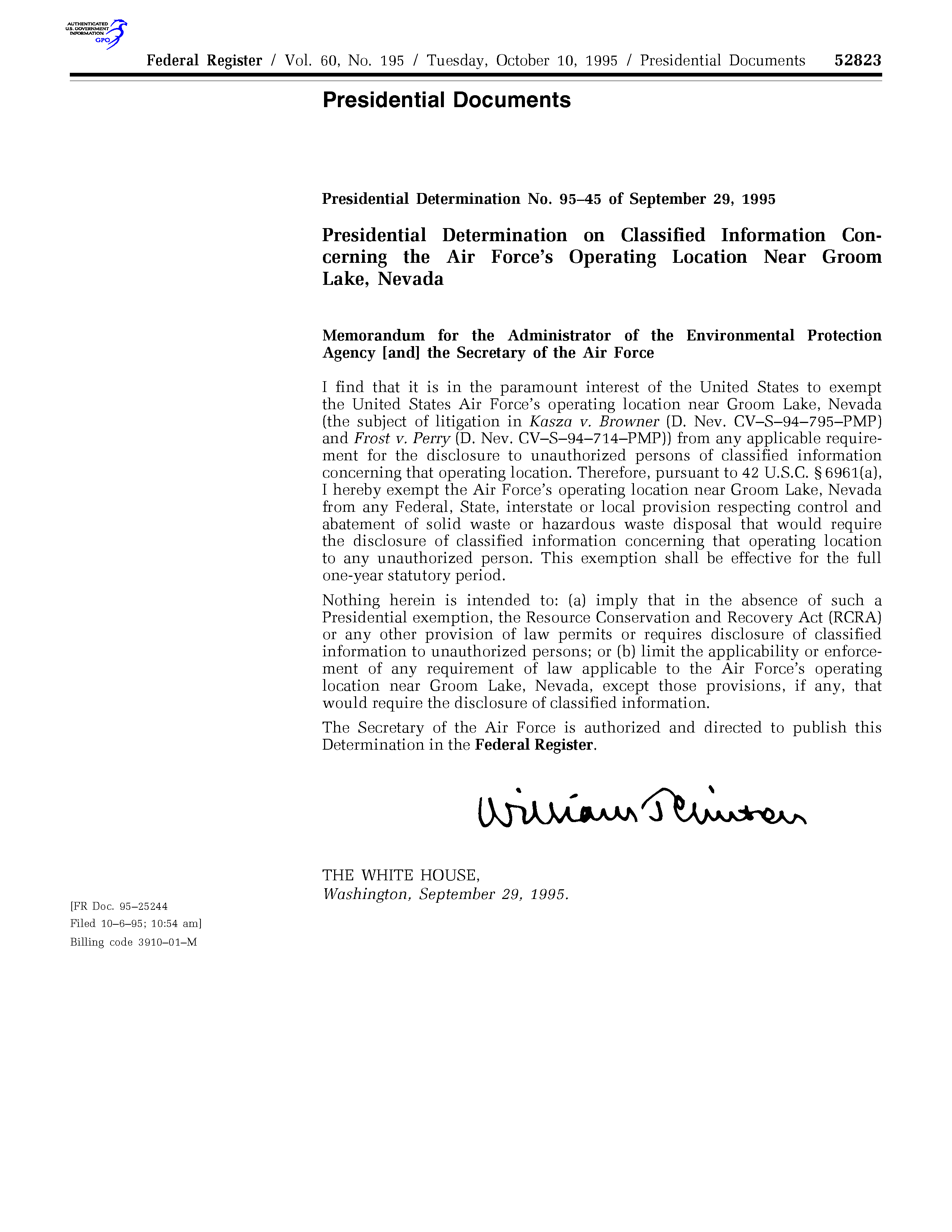
The 1995 presidential determination by Bill Clinton preventing discovery from being able to continue in the lawsuit from former Area 51 employees.

The government invoked the state secrets privilege and petitioned U.S. District Judge Philip Pro to disallow disclosure of classified documents or examination of secret witnesses, claiming that it would threaten national security. Judge Pro rejected the government's argument. In response President Bill Clinton issued a presidential determination exempting what it called "the Air Force's operating location near Groom Lake, Nevada" from environmental disclosure laws. Consequently, the judge dismissed the suit due to lack of evidence.

Jonathan Turley, the attorney for the plaintiffs, appealed to the U.S. Court of Appeals for the Ninth Circuit on the grounds that the government was abusing its power to classify material. USAF Secretary Sheila E. Widnall filed a brief which stated that disclosures of the materials present in the air and water near Groom "can reveal military operational capabilities or the nature and scope of classified operations." The Ninth Circuit rejected the appeal and the U.S. Supreme Court refused to hear it, putting an end to the complainants' case.

The President annually issues a determination continuing the Groom exception which is the only formal recognition that the government has ever given that Groom Lake is more than simply another part of the Nellis Air Force Base complex. An unclassified memo on the safe handling of F-117 Nighthawk material was posted on an USAF web site in 2005. This discussed the same materials for which the complainants had requested information, which the government had claimed was classified. The memo was removed shortly after journalists became aware of it.

== Civil aviation identification ==
In December 2007, pilots noticed that the base had appeared in their aircraft navigation systems' latest Jeppesen database revision with the ICAO airport identifier code of KXTA and listed as "Homey Airport". The probably inadvertent release of the airport data led to advice by the Aircraft Owners and Pilots Association (AOPA) that student pilots should be explicitly warned about KXTA, not to consider it as a waypoint or destination for any flight even though it now appears in public navigation databases.

== Security ==
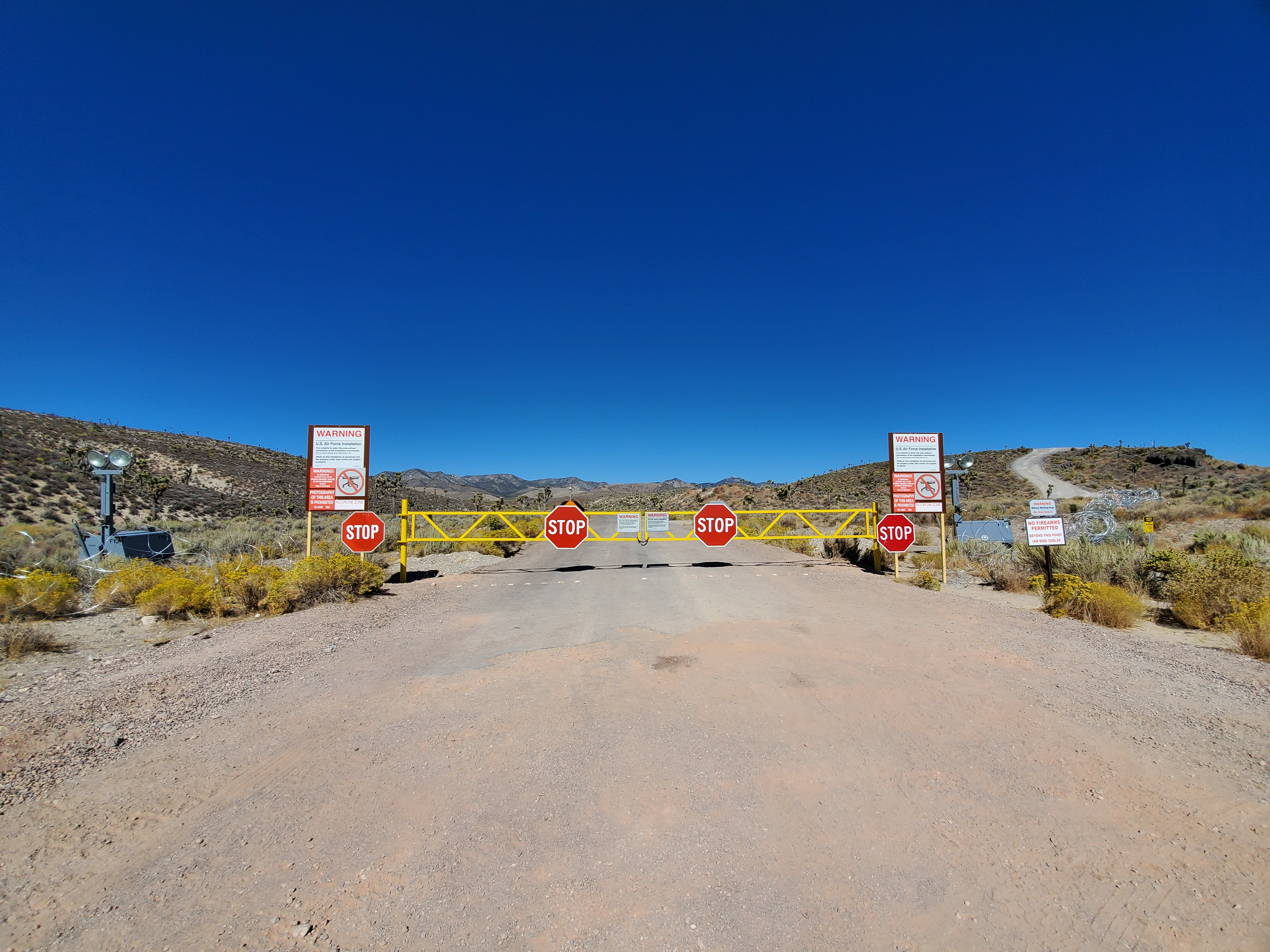
The main gate to Area 51, on Groom Road

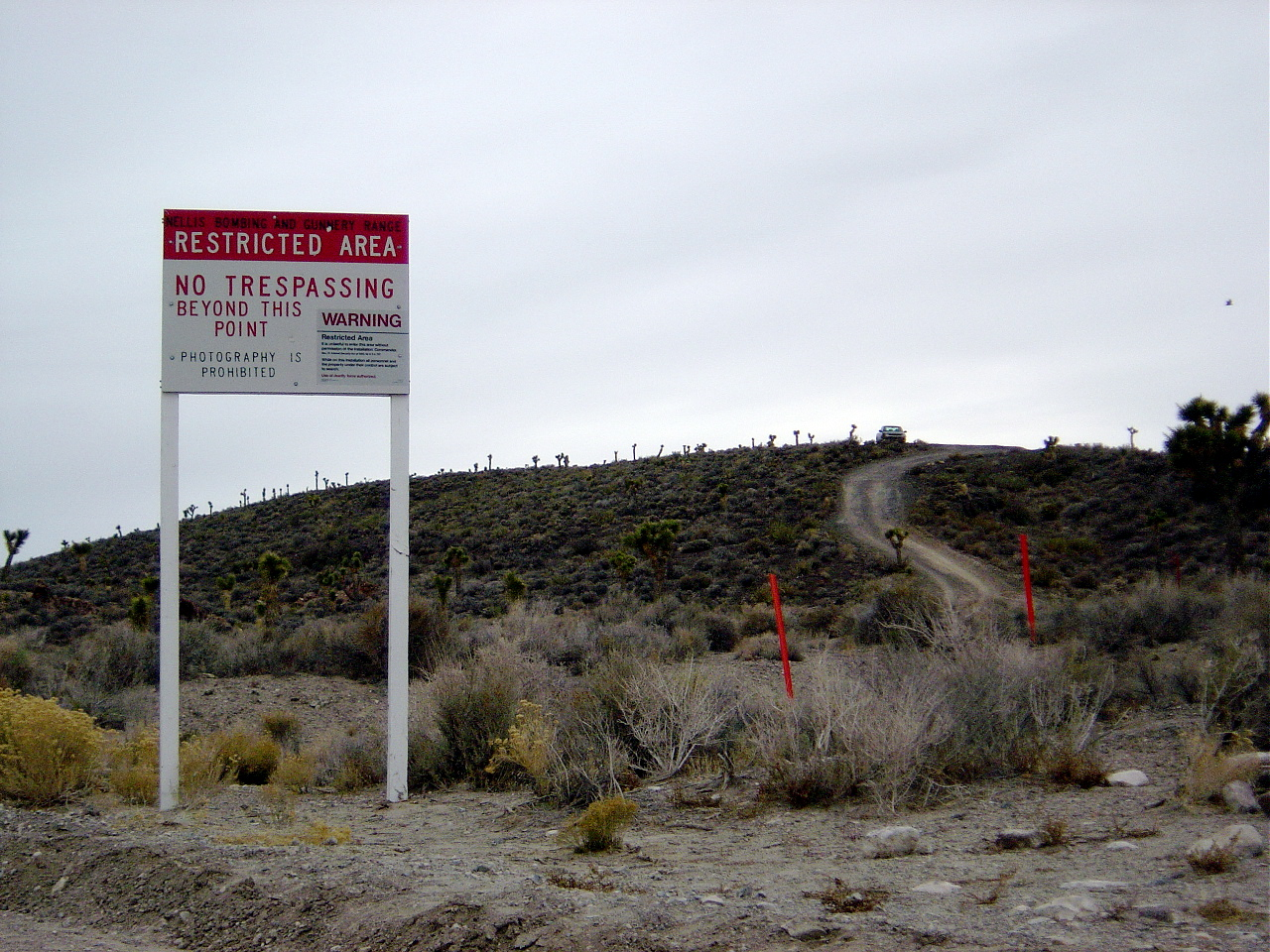
Area 51 border and warning sign stating that "photography is prohibited" and that "use of deadly force is authorized"

The perimeter of the base is marked out by orange posts and patrolled by guards in white pickup trucks and camouflage fatigues. The guards are popularly referred to as "camo dudes" by enthusiasts. The guards will not answer questions about their employers; however, according to the New York Daily News, there are indications they are employed through a contractor such as AECOM. Signage around the base perimeter advises that deadly force is authorized against trespassers.

Technology is also heavily used to maintain the border of the base; this includes surveillance cameras and motion detectors. Some of these motion detectors are placed some distance away from the base on public land to notify guards of people approaching.

=== 1974 Skylab photography ===
Dwayne A. Day published "Astronauts and Area 51: the Skylab Incident" in The Space Review in January 2006. It was based on a memo written in 1974 to CIA director William Colby by an unknown CIA official. The memo reported that astronauts on board Skylab had inadvertently photographed a certain location:

There were specific instructions not to do this. [redacted] was the only location which had such an instruction.

The name of the location was obscured, (Note: In the declassified documents, the name Area 51 is redacted in all but two instances (probably mistakes).) but the context led Day to believe that the subject was Groom Lake. Day wrote that "the CIA considered no other spot on Earth to be as sensitive as Groom Lake". Even within the agency's National Photographic Interpretation Center that handled classified reconnaissance satellite photographs, images of the site were removed from film rolls and stored separately as not all photo interpreters had security clearance for the information. The memo details debate between federal agencies regarding whether the images should be classified, with Department of Defense agencies arguing that it should and NASA and the U.S. State Department arguing that it should not be classified. The memo itself questions the legality of retroactively classifying unclassified images.

The memo includes handwritten remarks, apparently by Director of Central Intelligence Colby:

[Secretary of State Rusk] did raise it—said State Dept. people felt strongly. But he inclined leave decision to me (DCI)—I confessed some question over need to protect since:

1. USSR has it from own sats
2. What really does it reveal?
3. If exposed, don't we just say classified USAF work is done there?

The declassified documents do not disclose the outcome of discussions regarding the Skylab imagery. The debate proved moot, as the photograph appeared in the Federal Government's Archive of Satellite Imagery along with the remaining Skylab photographs.

=== 2019 shooting incident ===
On 28 January 2019, an unidentified man drove through a security checkpoint near Mercury, Nevada, in an apparent attempt to enter the base. After an 8-mile (13-kilometer) vehicle pursuit by base security, the man exited his vehicle carrying a "cylindrical object" and was shot dead by Nevada National Security Site security officers and local sheriff's deputies after refusing to obey requests to halt. There were no other injuries reported.

== UFO and other conspiracy theories ==
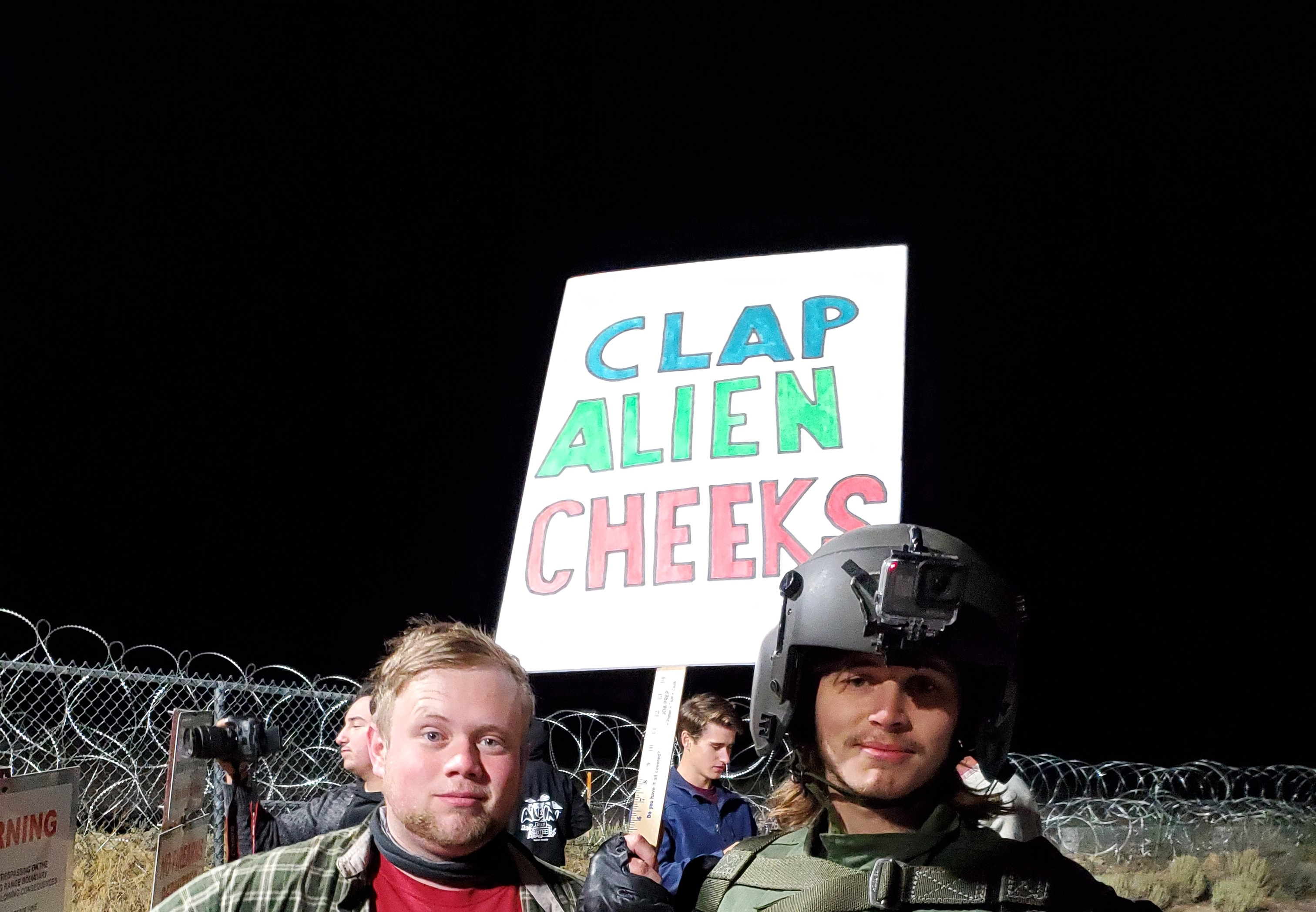
During the 2019 Raid of Area 51, protestors and UFO conspiracy theorists gathered at the back gate of Area 51.

Area 51 has become a focus of modern conspiracy theories due to its secretive nature and connection to classified aircraft research. Theories include:

- The storage, examination, and reverse engineering of crashed alien spacecraft, including material supposedly recovered at Roswell, New Mexico, the study of their occupants, and the manufacture of aircraft based on alien technology.
- Meetings or joint undertakings with extraterrestrials.
- The development of exotic energy weapons for the Strategic Defense Initiative or other weapons programs.
- The development of weather control.
- The development of time travel and teleportation technology.
- The development of exotic propulsion systems related to the Aurora Program.
- Activities related to the conspiracy theory of a one-world government.

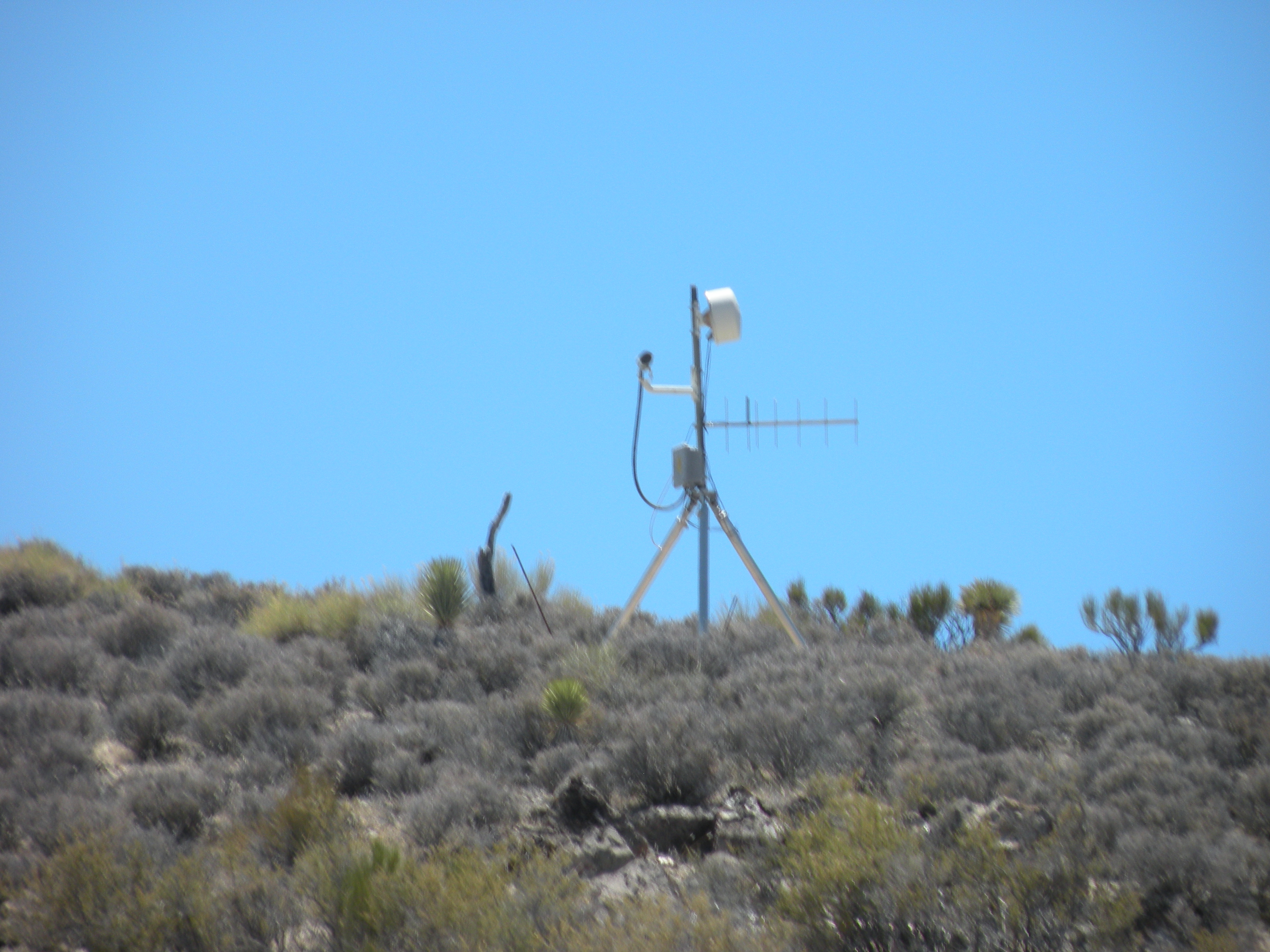
A closed-circuit TV camera watches over the perimeter of Area 51.

Many of the hypotheses concern underground facilities at Groom or at Papoose Lake (also known as "S-4 location"), 8.5 miles (13.7 km) south, and include claims of a transcontinental underground railroad system, a disappearing airstrip nicknamed the "Cheshire Airstrip", after Lewis Carroll's Cheshire Cat, which briefly appears when water is sprayed onto its camouflaged asphalt, and engineering based on alien technology.

In the mid-1950s, civilian aircraft flew under 20,000 feet (6,100 m) while military aircraft flew up to 40,000 feet (12,000 m). The U-2 began flying above 60,000 feet (18,000 m) and there was an increasing number of UFO sighting reports. Sightings occurred most often during early evening hours, when airline pilots flying west saw the U-2's silver wings reflect the setting sun, giving the aircraft a "fiery" appearance. Many sighting reports came to the Air Force's Project Blue Book, which investigated UFO sightings, through air-traffic controllers and letters to the government. The project checked U-2 and later OXCART flight records to eliminate the majority of UFO reports that it received during the late 1950s and 1960s, although it could not reveal to the letter writers the truth behind what they saw. Similarly, veterans of experimental projects such as OXCART at Area 51 agree that their work inadvertently prompted many of the UFO sightings and other rumors:

The shape of OXCART was unprecedented, with its wide, disk-like fuselage designed to carry vast quantities of fuel. Commercial pilots cruising over Nevada at dusk would look up and see the bottom of OXCART whiz by at 2,000-plus mph. The aircraft's titanium body, moving as fast as a bullet, would reflect the sun's rays in a way that could make anyone think, UFO.

They believe that the rumors helped maintain secrecy over Area 51's actual operations. The veterans deny the existence of a vast underground railroad system.

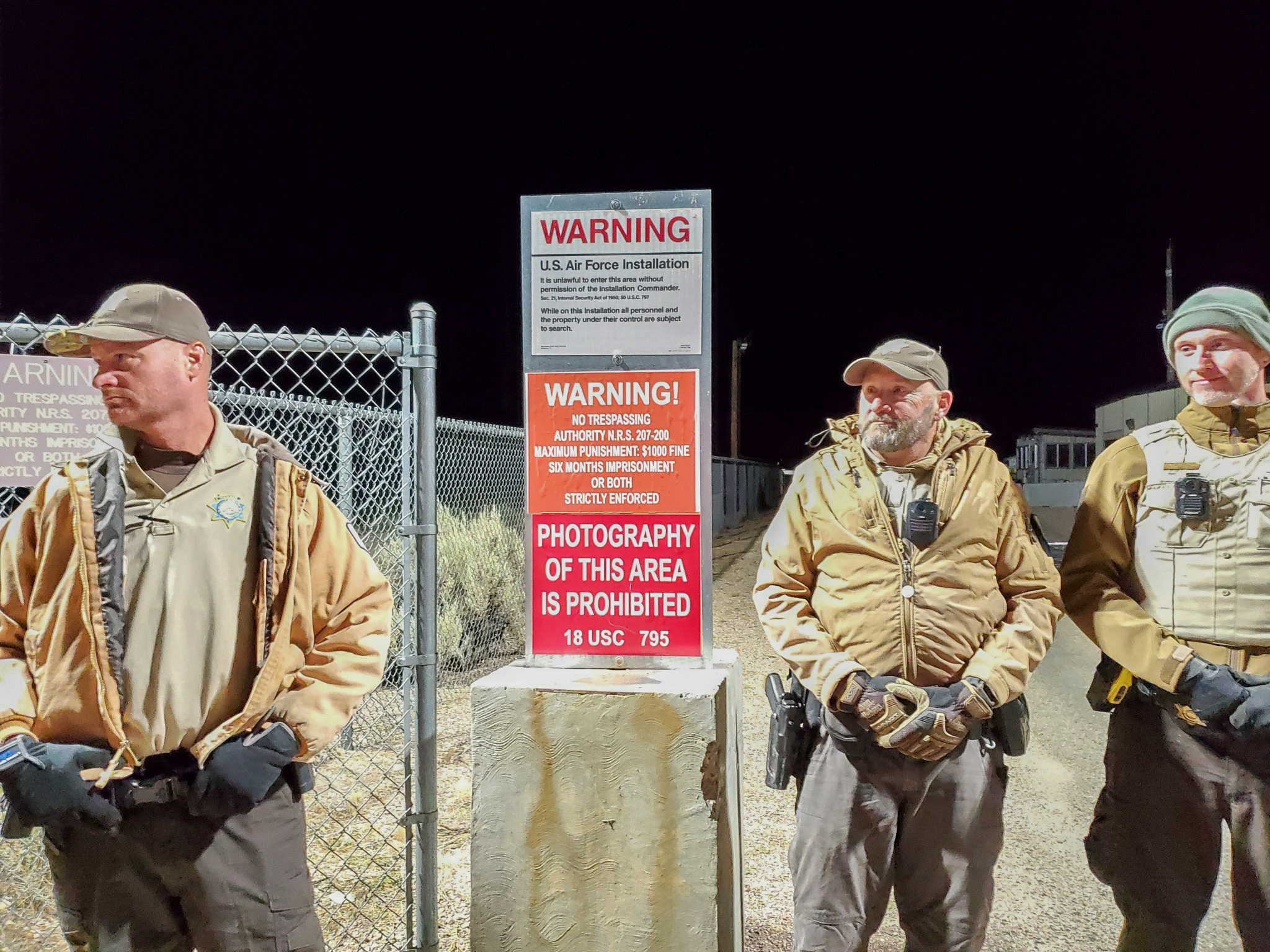
Lincoln County deputies guard the back gate of Area 51 during the 2019 raid.

On 14 October 1988, the syndicated television broadcast UFO Coverup? Live introduced Americans to the Majestic 12 hoax. It featured the first public mention of Nevada's Area 51 as a site associated with aliens.

Bob Lazar claimed in 1989 that he had worked at Area 51's "Sector Four (S-4)", said to be located underground inside the Papoose Range near Papoose Lake. He claimed that he was contracted to work with alien spacecraft that the government had in its possession. Similarly, the 1996 documentary Dreamland directed by Bruce Burgess included an interview with a 71-year-old mechanical engineer who claimed to be a former employee at Area 51 during the 1950s. His claims included that he had worked on a "flying disc simulator" which had been based on a disc originating from a crashed extraterrestrial craft and was used to train pilots. He also claimed to have worked with an extraterrestrial being named "J-Rod" and described as a "telepathic translator". In 2004, Dan Burisch (pseudonym of Dan Crain) claimed to have worked on cloning alien viruses at Area 51, also alongside the alien named "J-Rod". Burisch's scholarly credentials are the subject of much debate, as he was apparently working as a Las Vegas parole officer in 1989 while also earning a PhD at State University of New York.

In July 2019, more than 2,000,000 people responded to a joke proposal to storm Area 51 which appeared in an anonymous Facebook post. The event, scheduled for 20 September 2019, was billed as "Storm Area 51, They Can't Stop All of Us", an attempt to "see them aliens". Air Force spokeswoman Laura McAndrews said the government "would discourage anyone from trying to come into the area where we train American armed forces". Two music festivals in rural Nevada, AlienStock and Storm Area 51 Basecamp, were subsequently organized to capitalize on the popularity of the original Facebook event. Between 1,500 and 3,000 people showed up at the festivals, while over 150 people made the journey over several miles of rough roads to get near the gates to Area 51. Seven people were reportedly arrested at the event.

== In popular culture ==
Because of Area 51's prominence in relation to aliens and conspiracy theories, it has often been used as a setting and theme in popular culture, especially in science fiction works involving aliens. Works of media involving the facility include:

- The Defector, a 2023 novel by Canadian astronaut Chris Hadfield. In the novel, a Soviet Air Force pilot defects to the United States with his MiG-25 during the Cold War and is debriefed at Area 51.
- Grand Theft Auto: San Andreas, a 2004 video game developed by Rockstar Games, features a parody of Area 51 named "Area 69". A mission in the game involves the protagonist Carl Johnson stealing a jetpack from the facility.
- Independence Day, a 1996 film which features secret alien research occurring at Area 51.
- Paul, a 2011 film depicting an alien named Paul who was held prisoner in Area 51.
- The X-Files, a television show which shows FBI agents visiting Area 51 and encountering a UFO.

== See also ==
- Area 52
- Black operation
- Black project
- Black site
- List of United States Air Force installations
- Special access program
- Lop Nur (China)

== Citations ==
=== Sources ===
- Darlington, David (1998). Area 51: The Dreamland Chronicles. New York: Henry Holt. ISBN 978-0-8050-6040-9.
- Jacobsen, Annie (2012) [2011]. Area 51: An Uncensored History of America's Top Secret Military Base. New York: Back Bay Books. ISBN 978-0-316-13294-7.
- Patton, Phil (1998). Dreamland: Travels Inside the Secret World of Roswell and Area 51. New York: Villard/Random House. ISBN 978-0-375-75385-5.
- Rich, Ben R.; Janos, Leo (1994). Skunk Works: A Personal Memoir of My Years at Lockheed. Boston: Little, Brown. ISBN 978-0-316-74300-6.
- Stahl, Lesley (17 March 1996). "Area 51/Catch 22". 60 Minutes season 28, episode 27. CBS Television. A US TV news magazine's segment about the environmental lawsuit.
