= Groom Lake (salt flat) =

Salt flat in Area 51, in Nevada, United States

Coordinates: 37°16′N 115°48′W

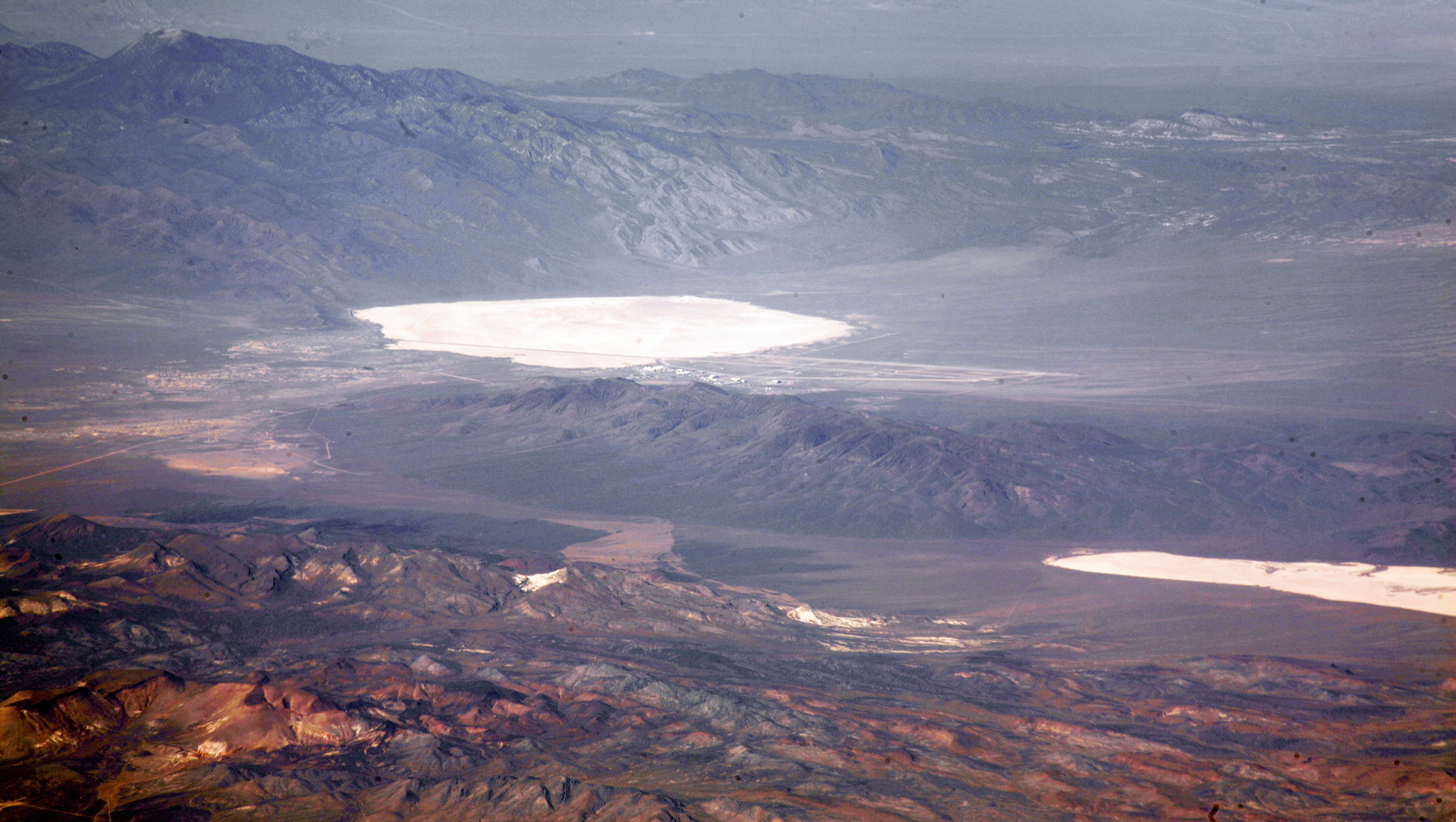

- Location within Nevada
- Location: Nevada, United States
- Type: Dry lake
- Basin countries: United States
- Max. length: 3.7 m (12 ft)
- Max. width: 3 m (9.8 ft)
- Shore length^{1}: 11.3 miles (18.2 km)
- Surface elevation: 4,409 ft (1,344 m)
- ^{1} Shore length is not a well-defined measure.

Groom Lake is a dry lake, also described as a salt flat, in Nevada. It is used for runways of the Nellis Bombing Range Test Site airport (KXTA). Part of the Area 51 USAF installation, it lies at an elevation of 4,409 ft (1,344 m) and is approximately 3.7 miles (6.0 km) from north to south and 3 miles (4.8 km) from east to west at its widest point, and is approximately 11.3 miles in circumference. Located within the namesake Groom Lake Valley portion of the Tonopah Basin, the lake is 25 mi (40 km) south of Rachel, Nevada.

The nearest publicly accessible vantage point is Tikaboo Peak, 26 miles (42 km) to the east. There were two closer vantage points, dubbed "Freedom Ridge" and "White Sides", but they were closed to public access in 1995 to prevent people from taking pictures of the installation.

== History ==
Lead and silver were discovered in the southern part of the Groom Range in 1864, and the English Groome Lead Mines Limited company financed the Conception Mines in the 1870s, giving the district its name (nearby mines included Maria, Willow and White Lake). The mining claims in Groom were acquired by J. B. Osborne and partners and patented in 1876, and Osborne's son acquired the interests in the 1890s. The claims were proved in 1916 when two companies began working their mines; that work continued until 1918, and resuming after World War II until the early 1950s.
