= Area 51: The Dreamland Chronicles =

Book by David Darlington

- First edition
- Author: David Darlington
- Publisher: Henry Holt & Company
- Publication date: November 1, 1997
- ISBN: 978-0-8050-6040-9
- OCLC: 37315248

Area 51: The Dreamland Chronicles is a 1997 non-fiction book about Area 51 in Nevada by David Darlington.

== Reception ==
A review in the Bulletin of the Atomic Scientists called the book "a real service" for readers interested in the early history of the site, but also scolded the author for entertaining "alien seekers, the tragically abducted, and self-appointed aliens ... saucer nuts" whose record "drown[s] out any legitimate inquiry into how much secrecy and how large a restricted compound the government needs to conduct black-budget activities". The A.V. Club called it "a definitive work on the place and its hold on our collective psyche" and "wonderfully even-handed" towards Ufologists who speculate about "the physically impossible".
