= Tikaboo Peak =

Mountain in Nevada, United States

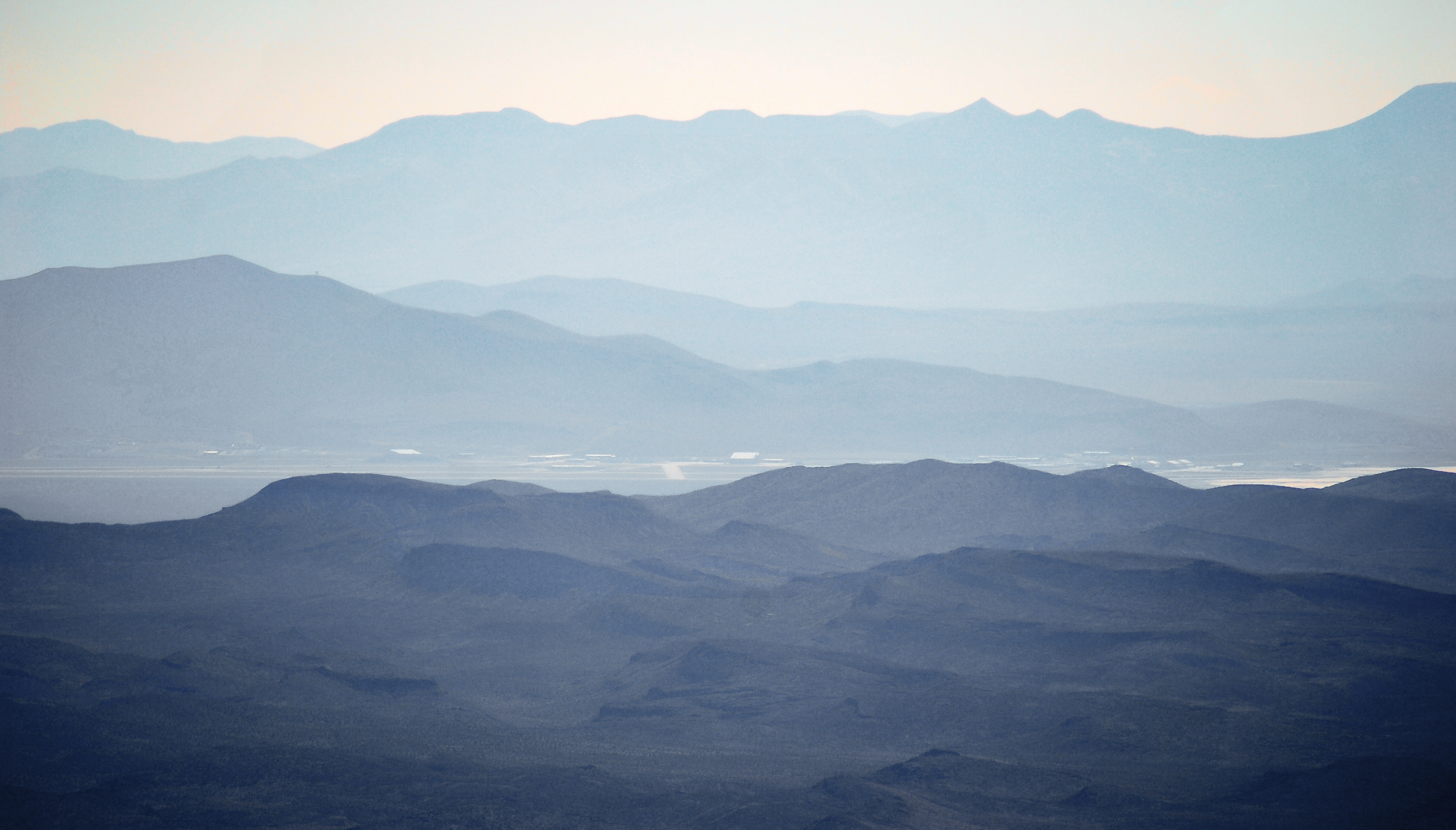
- Area 51 seen from Tikaboo Peak

Highest point
- Elevation: 7,915 ft (2,412 m) NAVD 88
- Prominence: 925 ft (282 m)
- Coordinates: 37°20′39″N 115°21′32″W

Geography
- Location within Nevada
- Location: Lincoln County, Nevada, U.S.
- Topo map: USGS Badger Spring

Climbing
- Easiest route: Hike

Tikaboo Peak is the unofficial name for a mountain in Lincoln County, Nevada, United States 26 miles (42 km) to the east of Area 51. It was the closest publicly accessible vantage point with a view of the area until a temporary closure took effect in March 2026.

Tikaboo Peak was used because the government closed two closer vantage points to Area 51 — Freedom Ridge and White Sides — to public access in 1995, due to the number of people photographing or filming the base from these sites.
