= Papoose Range =

Mountain range in Nevada, United States

- Location within Nevada

Highest point
- Elevation: 1,868 m (6,129 ft)

Geography
- Country: United States
- State: Nevada
- District: Lincoln County
- Range coordinates: 37°10′29.839″N 115°50′30.110″W
- Topo map: USGS Papoose Range

The Papoose Range is a mountain range in Lincoln County, Nevada.
