= Tonopah Test Range Airport =

US Air Force airfield at Tonopah, Nevada, United States

- Part of Tonopah Test Range
- Near Tonopah, Nevada in United States of America
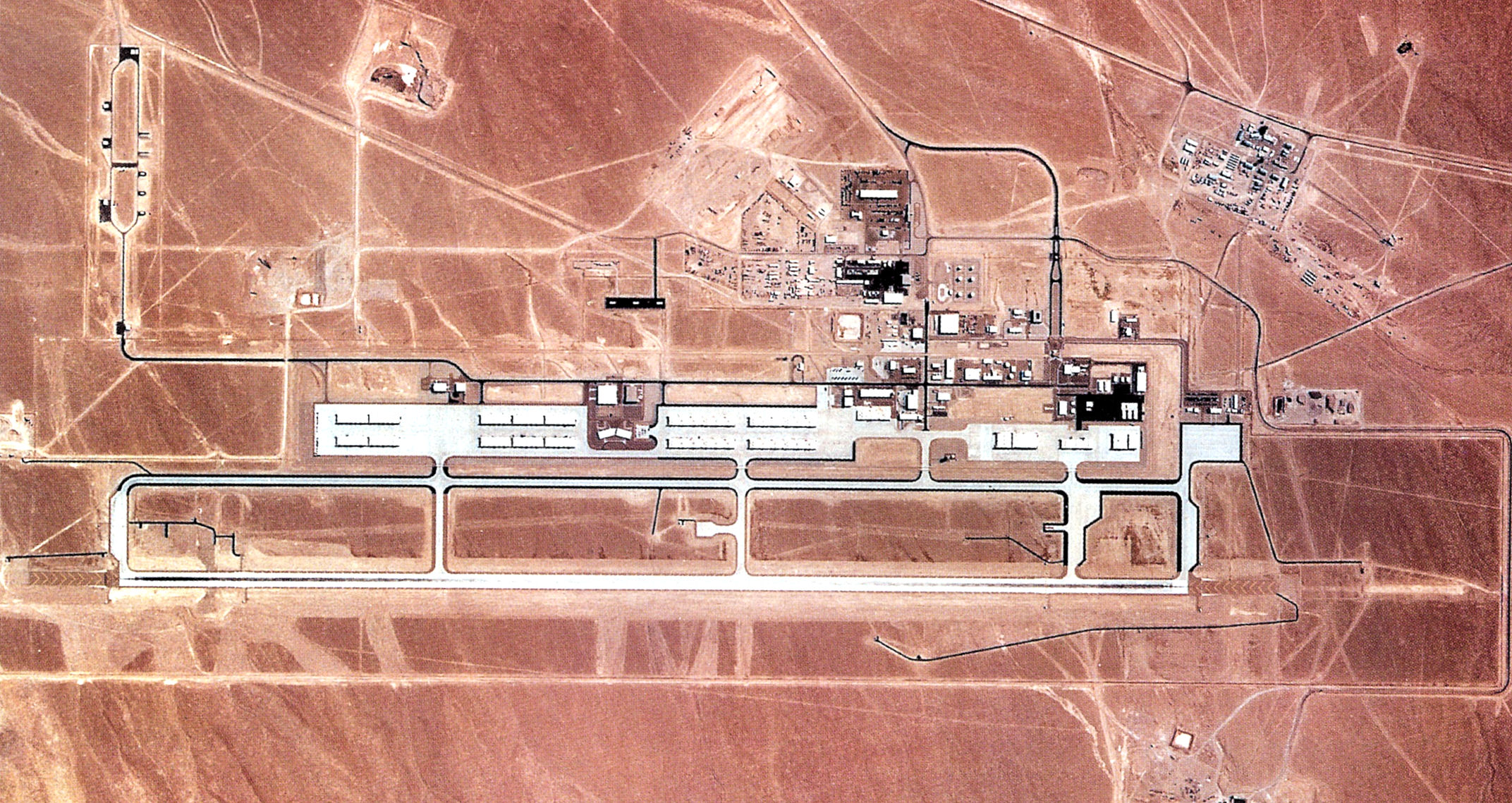
- A satellite image of Tonopah Test Range Airport during 1990, when the 37th Tactical Fighter Wing equipped with the F-117A Nighthawk was stationed there

Site information
- Type: US Air Force airfield
- Owner: Department of Defense
- Operator: US Air Force
- Controlled by: Air Combat Command (ACC)
- Condition: Operational

Location
- Shown in United States
- Coordinates: 37°47′41″N 116°46′43″W

Site history
- Built: 1957
- In use: 1957 – present

Garrison information
- Occupants: 30th Reconnaissance Squadron

Airfield information
- Identifiers: IATA: XSD, ICAO: KTNX, FAA LID: TNX, WMO: 724844
- Elevation: 1,691.6 metres (5,550 ft) AMSL
Runways
Direction	Length and surface
14/32	3,657.9 metres (12,001 ft) concrete

Tonopah Test Range Airport (IATA: XSD, ICAO: KTNX, FAA LID: TNX), at the Tonopah Test Range (Senior Trend project site PS-66, abbreviated TTR) is 27 NM (50 km; 31 mi) southeast of Tonopah, Nevada, and 140 mi (230 km) northwest of Las Vegas, Nevada. It is a major airfield with a 12,000 ft × 150 ft (3,658 m × 46 m) runway, instrument approach facilities, and nighttime illumination. The facility has over fifty hangars and an extensive support infrastructure.

== Overview ==
Tonopah is controlled by the USAF Air Combat Command. The primary use of this airport, to public knowledge, is to shuttle government employees to the weapons test range from Harry Reid International Airport in Las Vegas. Historically it has been used for classified Air Force operations.

The primary (paved) access to the facility is off of U.S. Route 6 at the north end of the airport. Dirt road access points also exist on the south and east sides of the range. The site is plainly visible from commercial airliners, which pass 17 NM (31 km; 20 mi) north of the base on transcontinental flights.

== History ==
The Tonopah Range Airport first opened in 1957, supporting operations on the test range itself, which was used for United States Atomic Energy Commission funded nuclear weapon programs.

The earliest known depiction of the airfield was on the July 1970 Air Force Tactical Pilotage Chart. The 1982 Aircraft Owners and Pilots Association Airport Directory described the Tonopah Test Range airfield as having a single 6,600 ft (2,012 m) paved runway.

=== 4477th Test and Evaluation Squadron ===
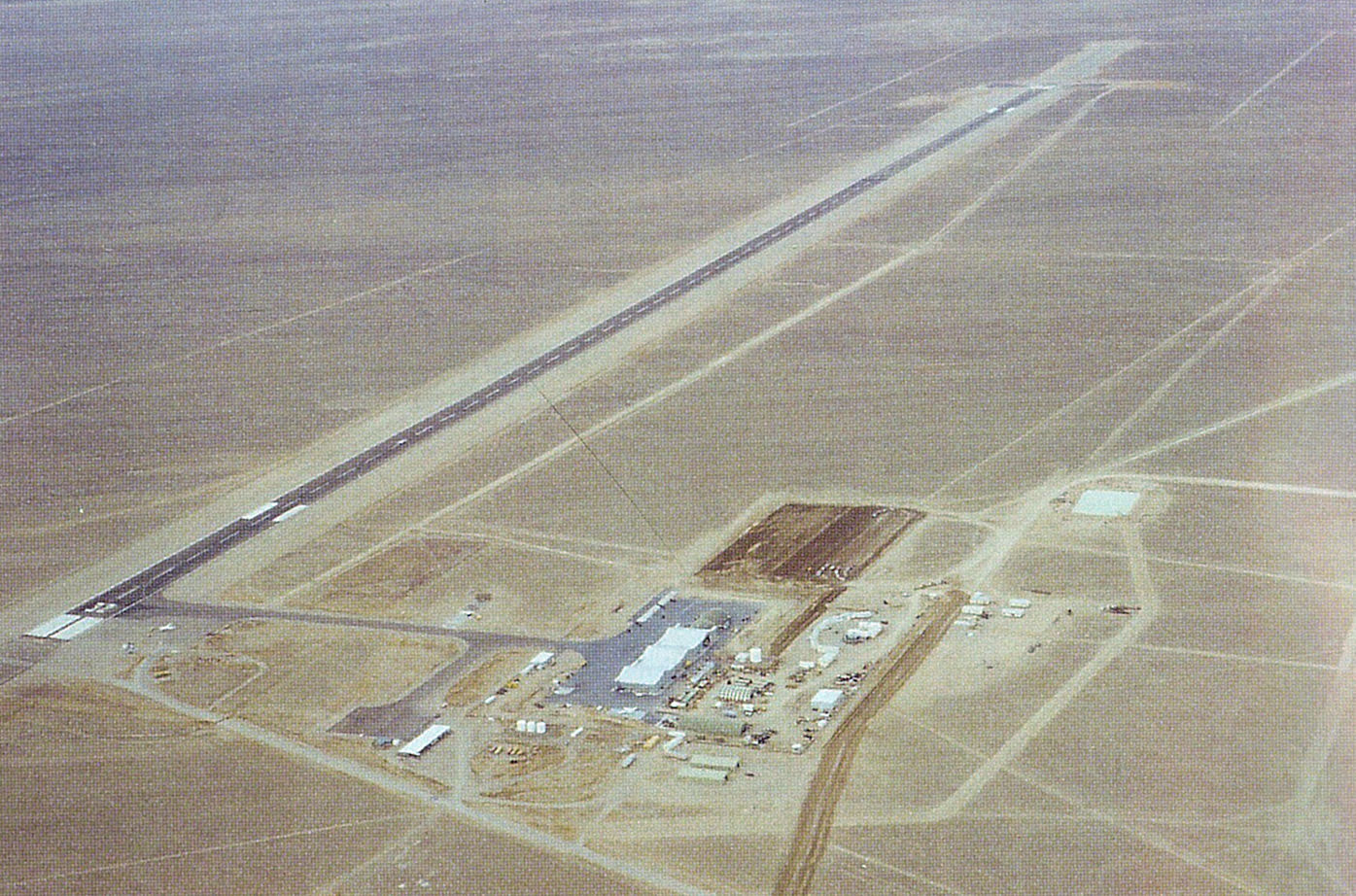
Tonopah Test Range Airport in 1982

Operation Rolling Thunder in March 1965 led the North Vietnamese Air Force to introduce the subsonic MiG-17 (J5) and the supersonic MiG-21 to the Vietnam War, pitting them against U.S. aircraft. The MiG-21 posed a major threat to Israeli Air Defenses as well as to American pilots, so the US loaned a MiG-21 that Israel had acquired, and evaluated it in a series of test flights known as Have Doughnut. A similar program was carried out with MiG-17s under the codes Have Drill and Have Ferry.

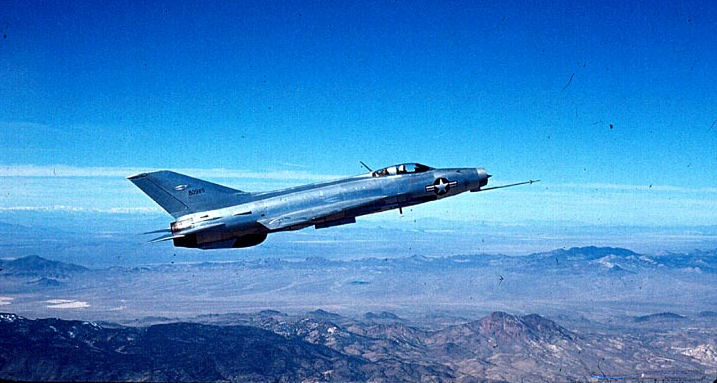
HAVE DOUGHNUT (MiG-21F-13) flown during its 1968 exploitation

By June 1969, the results of the evaluations of the MiG-21 and MiG-17s were incorporated into the USAF Fighter Weapons School and the Navy TOPGUN training school, and aggressor squadrons were formed there to train pilots in mock dogfights. In May 1973, Project Have Idea was initiated for joint technical and tactical evaluation of Soviet aircraft types, and took over the older Have Doughnut, Have Drill, and Have Ferry projects. It was undertaken by Detachment 1, 57th Fighter Weapons Wing. On 1 April 1977, the 4477th Tactical Evaluation Flight (4477th TEF) was formed at Nellis AFB as a tactical evaluation organization and aggressor squadron under the 57th Fighter Weapons Wing.

Sales of United States fighter aircraft to Indonesia and Egypt in the mid-1970s to replace the Soviet fighter aircraft allowed these nations to covertly transfer unneeded MiG-21 and newer MiG-23 aircraft to the United States for evaluation. Up to 25 of these Soviet aircraft made their way to Groom Lake and pilots assigned to Detachment 1, 57th FWW at Nellis were sent to the facility for training as pilots for aggressor squadrons. However, by the mid-1970s, as the fleet of Soviet aircraft grew at Groom Lake it became crowded and a new classified facility was needed.

The Tonopah Test Range Airport was only 70 miles to the northwest of Groom Lake and was on the controlled AEC Test Range, so it fit the need for a new facility. The AEC airport had the potential for improvement and expansion, and the only public land overlooking the base was miles away. Although it is not as hidden as Groom Lake, the airport was remote enough to operate the Soviet aircraft in secrecy. The security surrounding the Tonopah Test Range was so effective that the new base was not publicly reported as an Air Force military airfield until 1985.

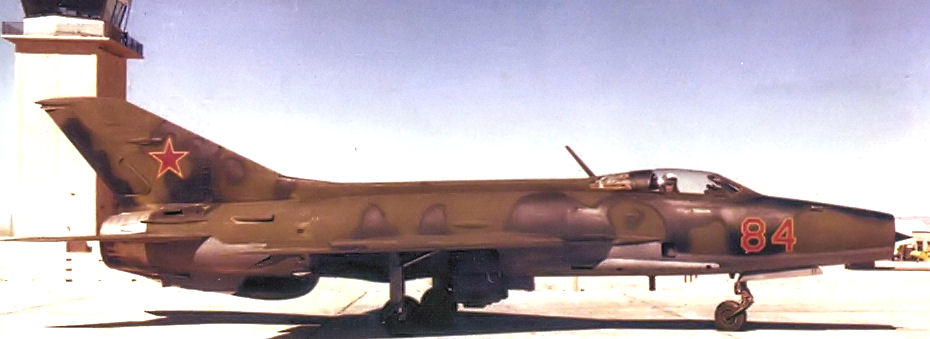
"Red 84" MiG-21F-13 taxiing past the control tower, 1986

On July 17, 1979, the 4477th TEF flew its first operational sorties from Tonopah. In 1980 the 4477th TEF was re-designated as the 4477th Test and Evaluation Squadron (4477th TES) and the operation was renamed to Constant Peg. The squadron developed realistic combat training operations featuring adversary tactics, dissimilar air combat training, and electronic warfare. From Tonopah, aerial dogfights were staged between the various MiG models against virtually every US fighter aircraft. There were also tests against SAC's B-52 Stratofortress and B-58 Hustlers to judge the ability of the bombers countermeasures systems, during which they performed radar cross-section and propulsion tests that contributed to improvements in US aerial performance.

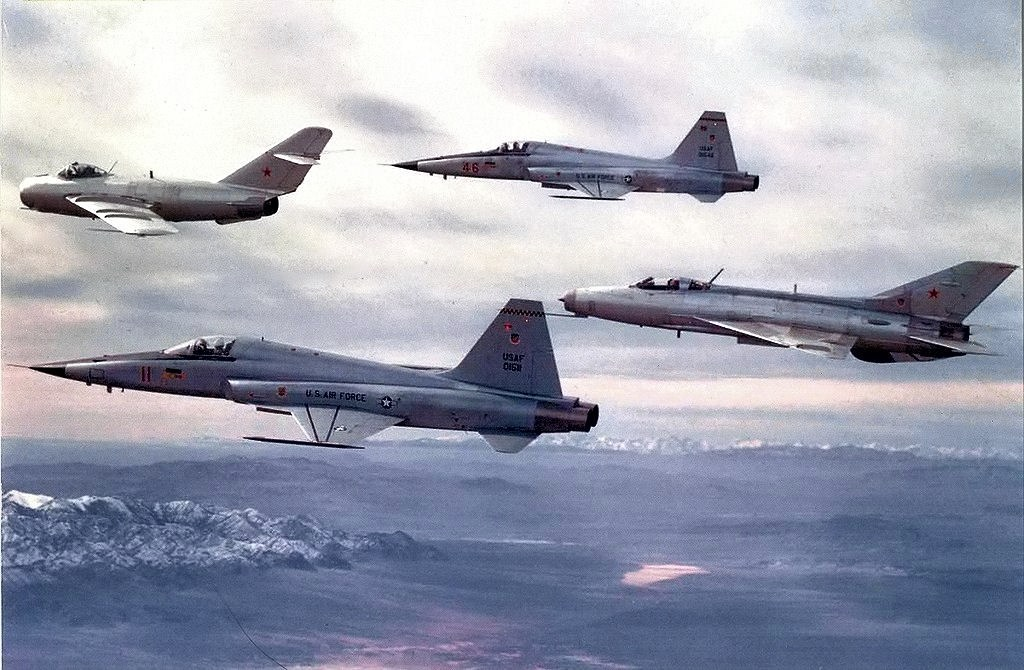
Two 64th Fighter Weapons Squadron F-5s with a 4477th TEF MiG-17 (leading) and MiG-21 (trailing) in 1979. Note the Tactical Air Command badge applied to the vertical fin of the MiG-21.

Planes kept coming in to the test range. At least three Cuban pilots defected with their MiGs. A number of Chinese made MiGs were purchased outright from China via a front company and were imported in crates. Three Syrians flew their MiG-23 and MiG-29s to Turkey in 1988.

Over the course of the 4477th TES's time in Tonopah, U.S. test pilots flew several models of Soviet-designed MiGs and other foreign aircraft, including:

- MiG-17
- Shenyang J-6
- MiG-21
- MiG-23
- MiG-25
- MiG-29
- Sukhoi Su-22

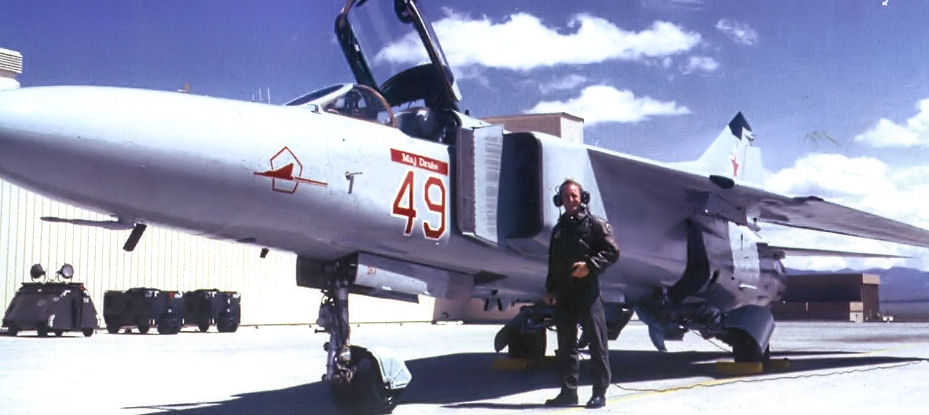
"Red 49" MiG-23 on the Tonopah ramp, 1988

None of the Soviet-designed aircraft at Tonopah flew in bad weather or at night. All were very short-legged, compared to contemporary US aircraft, and sorties were limited to 20 minutes or so. The MiGs had US airspeed indicators and a few other minor instrument and safety modifications. Other than that, they were stock, even maintaining their Warsaw Pact paint jobs. The pilots had no manuals for the aircraft, although some tried to write one. Nor was there a consistent supply of spare parts, which had to be refurbished or manufactured at high cost.

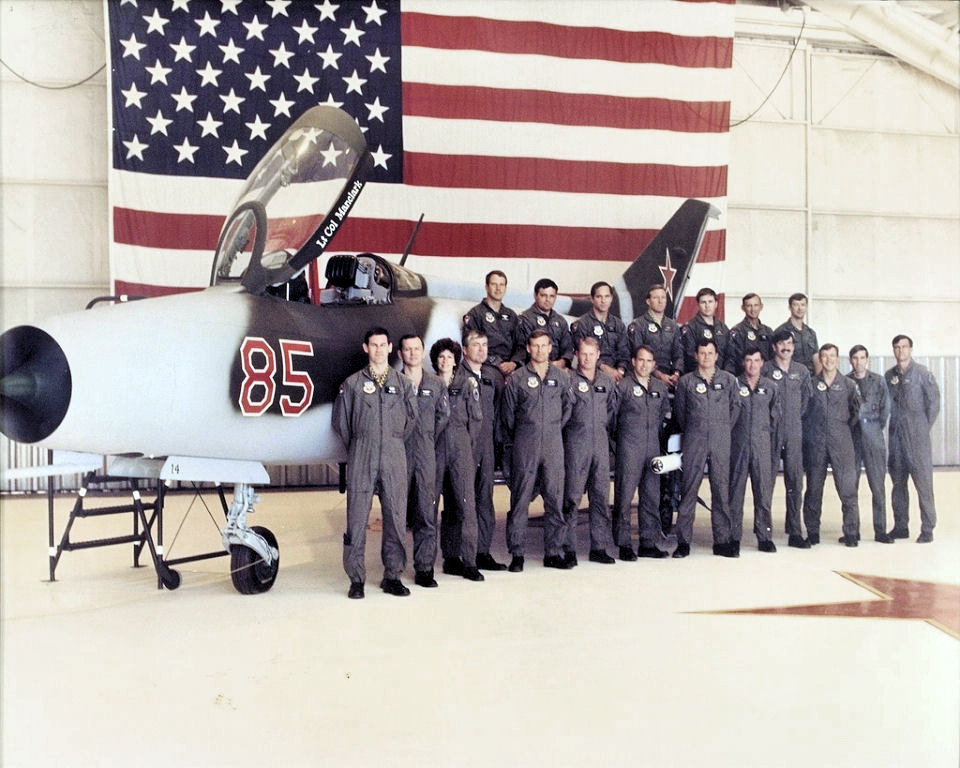
1986 photo of members of the 4477th Tactical Evaluation Squadron standing in front of "Red 85", a former Indonesian MiG-21F-13 under evaluation

Near the end of the Cold War the program was abandoned and the squadron was disbanded. Flight operations closed down in March 1988, although the 4477th was not deactivated until July 1990, according to one official Air Force history. The decision to shut down operations may have been the combination of a new generation of Soviet aircraft entering service and a round of budget cuts from Washington.

The assets of the squadron could not go to the scrapyard at Davis-Monthan AFB, and the fate of them remains, in some cases, still classified. Several of the MiG-21s were sent to museums or now are on static display. Some of the airplanes may have been broken up, and it is rumored that some were buried in the Nevada desert. A few were used for target practice on Air Force weapons ranges.

In 2006, the Constant Peg program was declassified and the USAF held a series of press conferences about the former top secret US MiGs. It was revealed that the US MiGs flew more than 15,000 sorties and nearly 7,000 aircrew flew in training against dissimilar aggressors in the Nevada desert between 1980 and the end of the program in 1988.

=== F-117A Nighthawk program ===
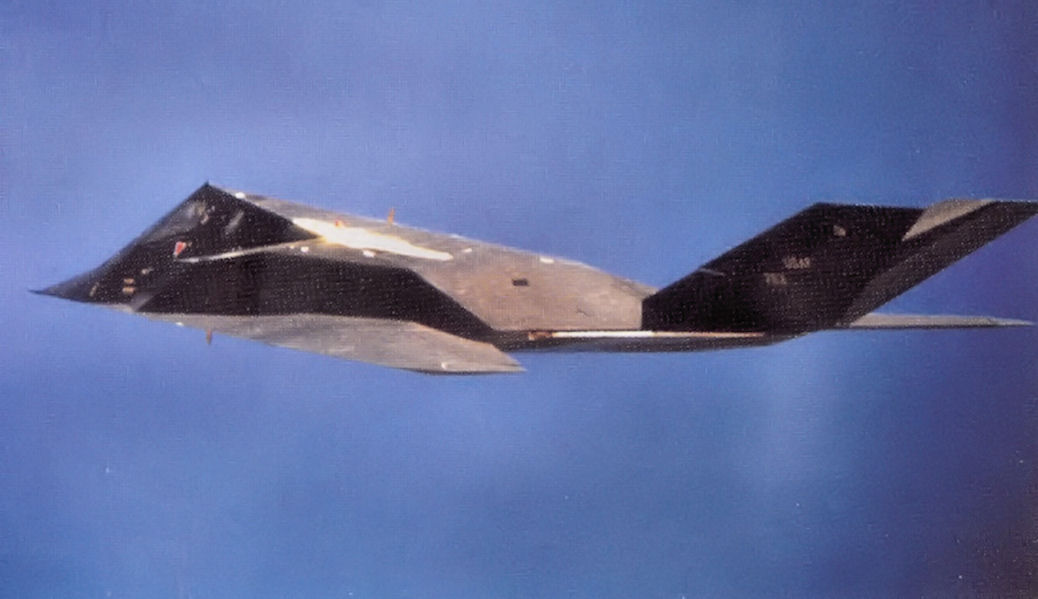
Uncoded F-117A Nighthawk 79-10782 (FSD-3). Photo taken while assigned to the 4450th Tactical Group, 1989. The F-117s did not carry tail codes while in development and flight testing in order not to identify their place of origin.

In the 1980s, Tonopah Airport became a major operating location for the Lockheed F-117A Nighthawk. The first flight testing of the stealth YF-117A aircraft began in June 1981 at Groom Lake Nevada. However, Groom Lake had too many other operations going on to support another operational unit, and having the operational unit at Groom Lake would allow the many uninvolved personnel to see the highly classified project. Therefore, a new covert base had to be established for F-117 operations.

In the summer of 1979, Tonopah Test Range Airport was selected to be the home of the Tactical Air Command 4450th Tactical Group (4450th TG). The mission of the 4450th at Tonopah was to bring the classified F-117A Stealth Fighter to an initial operating capability.

Beginning in October 1979 Tonopah Test Range Airport was reconstructed and expanded. The base was immediately staffed with US Air Force security police. The flight line was walled off with a double fence; the only access to the runway was through gates. The area between the fences was lighted at night and had intruder detectors. At first, the facilities were limited to a few buildings, a small mess hall, and sixteen winterized trailers. Security checkpoints were placed on the sole public access road which led to the test range. The 6,000 ft (1,829 m) runway was lengthened to 10,000 ft (3,048 m). Taxiways, a concrete apron, a large maintenance hangar, and a propane storage tank were added. Phase II of the expansion involved the construction of an extra taxiway, a new control tower, a 42,000-square-foot (3,900 m^{2}) hangar, a parts warehouse, a dining hall, a water storage tank, and extensive fuel storage tanks. Phase III of the expansion was a 2,000 ft (610 m) runway extension to a total length of 12,000 ft (3,658 m). Extensions were made to taxiways, to the ramp, the runway gained arrestor gear, and new navigation aids were installed. More fuel storage was provided, together with Liquid Oxygen (LOX) storage, a fire station, and the first 24 aircraft hangars. The cost was over $100 million.

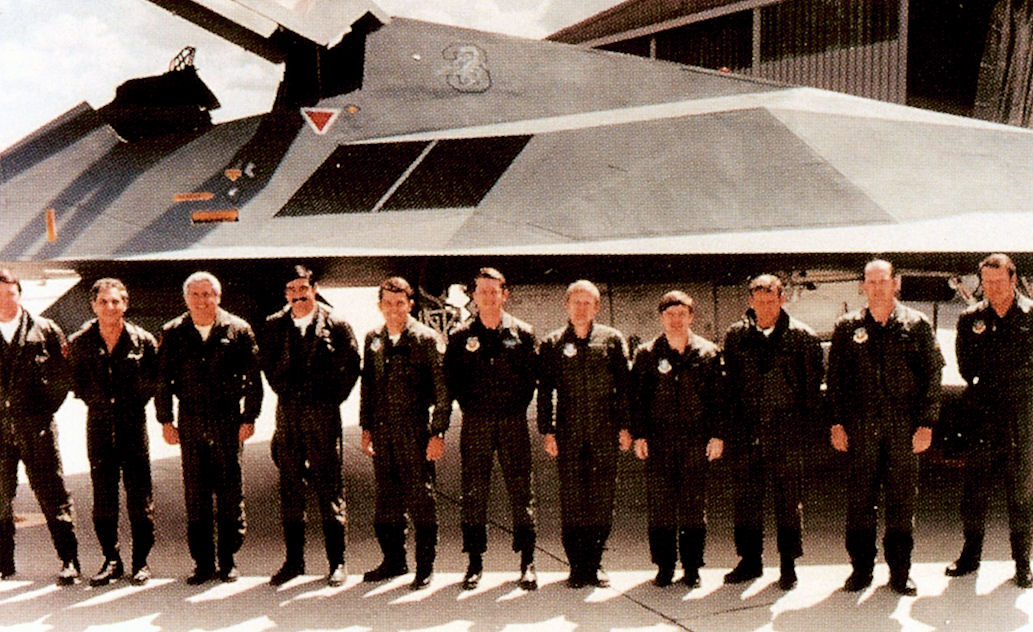
4450th Tactical Group - F-117 test pilots

On 17 May 1982, the move of the 4450th TG from Groom Lake to Tonopah was initiated, with the final components of the move completed in early 1983. The Tactical Air Command ("R"-Unit), also known as the "Baja Scorpions", remained at Groom Lake until the last production F-117 was delivered from Lockheed in July 1990. During the operational lifetime of the F-117 personnel from Tonopah and later Holloman AFB would still be temporarily deployed to Groom Lake for various checkout flights of classified elements of the aircraft.

The F-117 project was highly classified and Tonopah Test Range became a black project facility. As such, the area around Tonopah was closely monitored and security was stringent. If a truck was seen in the hills around the base it would be investigated, as were airplanes flying near the base's restricted airspace. Air Force members were prohibited from driving into the town of Tonopah without special permission. Personnel crossing into the double-fence area housing the hangars and flightline were required to pass through a security control point. The control point used an Identimat hand geometry scanner provided by Wackenhut, the company that provided perimeter security on the TTR. The F-117 operations building was a windowless vault. Within the building was another vault room where the flight manuals were stored. When in use, the manuals had to be in the pilot's physical possession.

Nearly all Air Force personnel and their families lived in the city of Las Vegas. Group personnel would be flown to Tonopah each Monday morning and board a contract Key Airlines Boeing 727-100 aircraft at Nellis AFB, which operated about 15 daily flights between the two bases. The personnel would live in dormitories at "Mancamp" during the work week, then fly back to Nellis AFB Thursday afternoon or Friday morning. All dormitory rooms had private bathrooms and showers, televisions with about 30 cable TV channels, a telephone with unrestricted local service to Las Vegas, access to laundry rooms in the building, and access to 24-hour recreational and dining facilities around Mancamp. Civilian engineers and executives were allowed to commute on the Key Airlines or Janet flights, but all other civilians generally lived in the surrounding region and drove to the TTR in their own vehicles or commuted in chartered buses.

==== F-117A operations ====
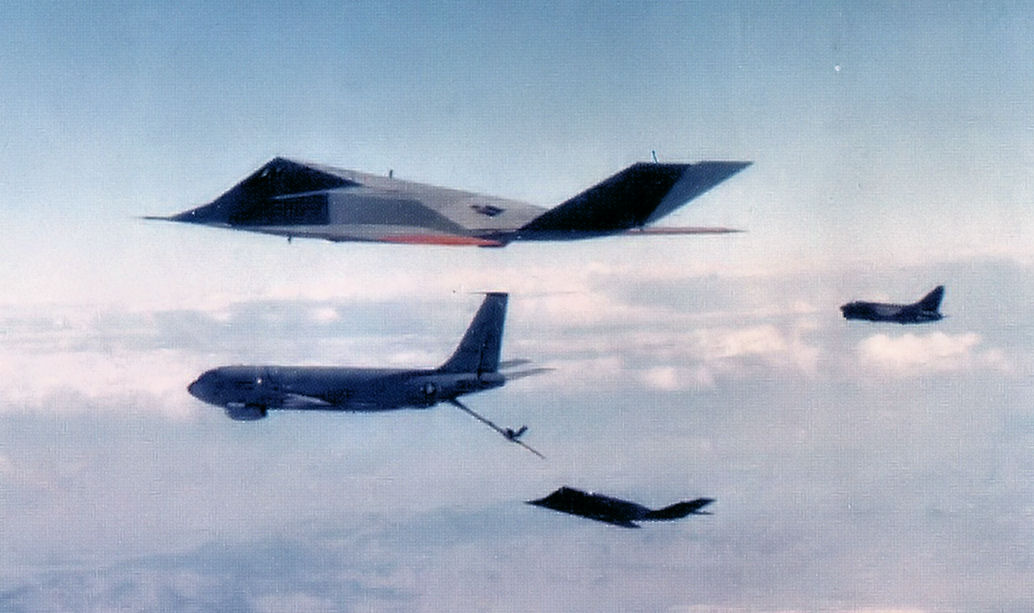
F-117s and an A-7D performing an aerial refueling from a KC-135 Stratotanker

Routine F-117A operations began in late 1982. Before each night's sorties, there would be a mass briefing of the pilots, followed by target and route study. The hangar doors were not opened until one hour after sunset. This meant the first takeoff would not be made until about 7:00 P.M. in the winter and 9:30 P.M. in the summer. Eventually two waves were flown per night, involving eight primary aircraft and two spares, in a total of eighteen sorties. The aircraft would fly the first wave, called the "early-go", then return to Tonopah and be serviced. A second group of pilots would then fly the second wave, the "late-go". Flights were conducted under radio silence and without air traffic control contact. Typically, the training flights simulated actual missions. A normal mission would have two targets and several turn points. On other nights, there would be a "turkey shoot" with some fourteen targets. The pilots would get points for each one, added up at the end of the night to see who won. The missions ranged across the southwest, and the targets were changed each time, to ensure a challenge.

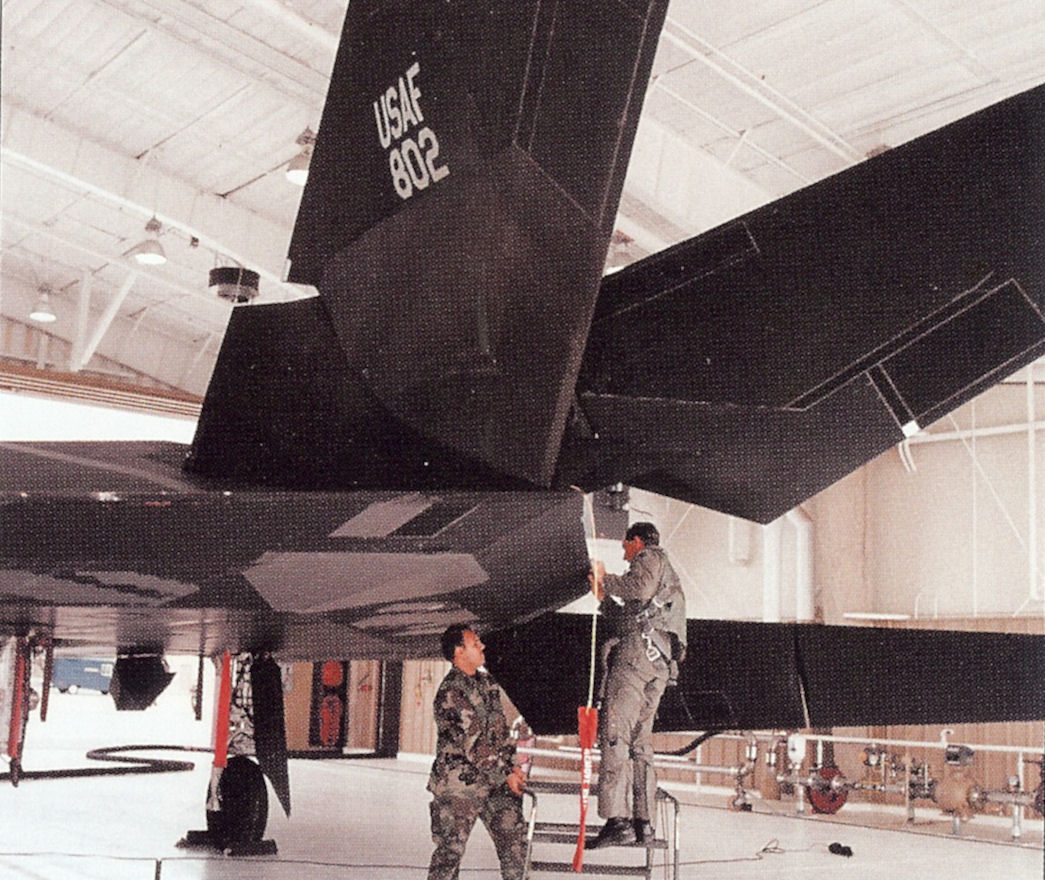
Ground maintenance performed inside a hangar at Tonopah Airport in 1989

The second wave was completed by about 3:00 A.M. in the winter, a few hours later in the summer. The planes had to be in their hangars and the doors closed one hour before sunrise. After landing, the pilots would be debriefed.

The new F-117 fleet was considered for several high-profile military operations during the mid-1980s, but operations remained largely confined to nighttime flights around Nevada and California for a number of years. It took a presidential authorization to begin off-range flights. In the event of an unscheduled landing, the pilots carried a signed letter from a senior Air Force general ordering the base or wing commander to protect the aircraft.

==== Support aircraft ====
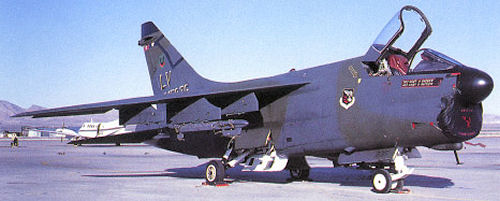
4450th TG A-7D at Nellis AFB

Because of the tight restrictions on F-117A flights during the 4450th TG at this time, also known as the "black" era, a stand-in aircraft was needed for training and practice and to provide a cover story for the 4450th TG's existence. The aircraft chosen was the Ling-Temco-Vought A-7 Corsair II. The A-7Ds came from England AFB, Louisiana, which was converting to the A-10 Thunderbolt II. The A-7D had been chosen as an interim trainer because its cockpit layout and avionics were considered similar to those in the F-117. The 4450th TG was the last active USAF unit to fly the A-7D. Along with the A-7Ds that came from England AFB, the group acquired an A-7K twin-seat trainer from the Arizona Air National Guard for checkout flights at Nellis. A second A-7K was acquired from Edwards AFB (73–1008), which was the twin-seat prototype that had been converted from its original A-7D configuration in 1978. In doing so, the group became the only active-duty unit to fly the A-7K.

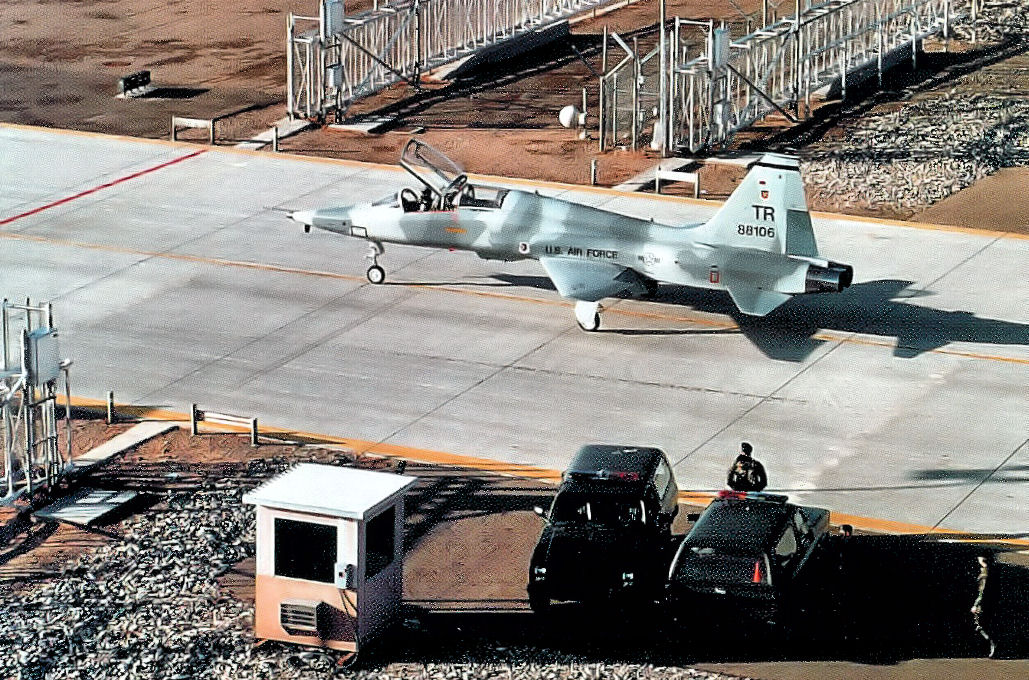
T-38 Talon 68–8016 at Tonopah Airport. T-38s replaced the A-7Ds in early 1989 after the public announcement of the F-117A's existence.

A-7D flight operations began in June 1981 concurrent with the very first YF-117A flights. The A-7s wore a unique "LV" tail code (for Las Vegas) and were officially based at Nellis Air Force Base. They were maintained by the 4450th Maintenance Squadron, based at Nellis. Some A-7s operated from Tonopah, and care was taken to leave them outside the hangars, so that satellites passing overhead would show Tonopah operating the Corsairs and nothing else. There were approximately 20 aircraft, including the A-7K trainers.

In addition to providing an excuse for the 4450th's existence and activities, the A-7s were also used to maintain pilot currency, particularly in the early on when very few production F-117As were available. The pilots learned to fly chase on A-7 test and training flights, perform practice covert deployments, and practice other skills that could not be accomplished using F-117As, given the tight restrictions imposed on all F-117A operations. On off-range flights with F-117As, the pilots talked to the air traffic controllers as if they were in an A-7D Corsair II. Each F-117 aircraft also carried a transponder that indicated to radar operators that it was an A-7.

In January 1989, just three months after the USAF admitted the F-117A existed, the aging A-7s were replaced with newer T-38A and AT-38B Talon trainers as a measure to streamline the F-117A's training operation. Many of these Talons formerly belonged to the 4447th TES. With the arrival of the T-38s, the squadron's Corsairs were retired, and the borrowed A-7K was returned to the Arizona Air National Guard.

==== 37th Tactical Fighter Wing ====
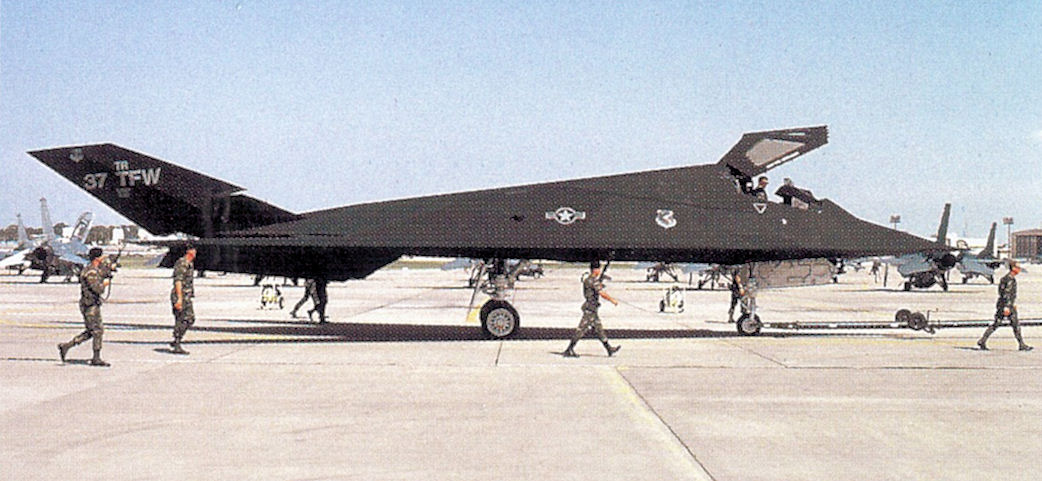
F-117A Nighthawk 85-0830 being towed at Tonopah after its return from Operation Desert Storm, 1991. Note the spotters, the armed security police with M-16s, and tow bar attached to the front landing gear.

In spite of the tight security, the Air Force was already making plans to normalize future support within the Logistics Command structure. As a "black" program, it would probably never achieve a support structure similar to that for F-15s or F-111s. The Sacramento Air Logistics Center was tasked in late 1983/early 1984 to prepare to take on full logistics and management responsibility for support of the F-117A. A depot was established in 1984 to accomplish repairs and install modifications on the aircraft. This depot, first located in Lockheed's Palmdale Plant 10 (PS-77), eventually took the place of Lockheed Depot Field Teams performing the depot work at Tonopah. The F-117s were moved between the TTR and the depot by C-5s, and were only loaded and unloaded at night. This required the aircraft to be defueled, disassembled, cradled, and then loaded aboard the C-5, flown to the depot, and unloaded before work could begin. The reverse had to occur at the end of depot work before the aircraft could be reassembled, flight-tested, and redelivered to Tonopah.

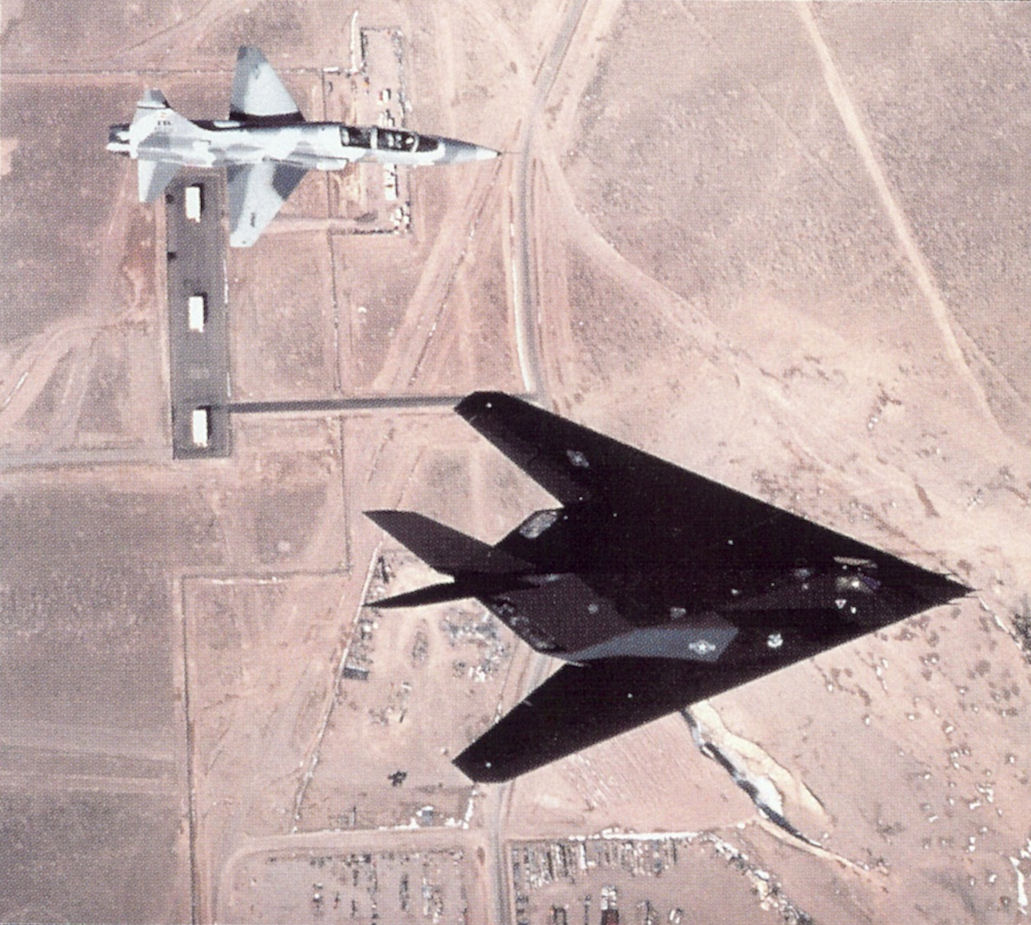
An F-117 Nighthawk with a T-38 Talon chase plane flying over Tonopah Test Range Airport

In November 1988 the Air Force formally acknowledged F-117 activities at Tonopah, bringing what was a "black" program into "gray" status. However, F-117 flight operations continued to be restricted to nighttime hours. Late in 1989 the Air Force began preparations to transition the F-117 into regular Air Force operations. This was done in two phases: first, they brought the aircraft under the umbrella of the Tactical Air Command, and second, they relocated the fleet to a regular Air Force base. The first phase came on October 5, 1989, when the 4450th Tactical Group was deactivated and the 37th Tactical Fighter Wing from George AFB was assigned to Tonopah. The Tactical Air Command (TAC) also activated the Det 1, 57 Fighter Weapons Wing (FWW) at Tonopah. During this phase, three pairs of F-117 aircraft left the TTR for Panama in December 1989 to participate in Operation JUST CAUSE. Only one mission with two F-117As was attempted.

In April 1990, the F-117 was placed on public display at Nellis AFB and the Air Force mission at Tonopah Test Range became a mostly unclassified "white" program, though at no time would the general public be permitted near the Tonopah complex or on the Nellis Range. During this phase, daytime F-117 flights began. The change to daytime, "white" program flying allowed radio operation and air traffic control contact. This required much less vigilance on the part of pilots and was cited as improving the safety of training operations.

The Summer of 1990 was the peak of Air Force activity at the Tonopah Test Range Airport. After the Iraqi invasion of Kuwait the base was mobilized to support Operation Desert Shield. On August 19, 1990, 22 F-117A's from the 415th and a dozen tankers left Tonopah for Langley AFB. A total of 18 F-117s would continue onward to Khamis Mushait Air Base in Saudi Arabia for Operation DESERT SHIELD, followed by hundreds of Tonopah support personnel. The planes, and a contingent of Tonopah Test Range personnel, remained in Saudi Arabia until late 1991. As a result of the deployment and the pending relocation to New Mexico, flying operations and staffing at the TTR declined significantly during 1991. Some of the support facilities which had been open 24 hours a day, such as the dining halls and library, began routinely closing at night.

==== Move to Holloman Air Force base ====
The second phase of integration came in January 1990 with the announcement that the 37th TFW would move from Tonopah to Holloman AFB, New Mexico, which would ultimately be delayed due to the Gulf War.

At the end of the Cold War, defense budgets were reduced. It was determined that there would be considerable savings by moving F-117 operations out of the remote site at Tonopah, as the security requirements of the F-117A had been lessened with its introduction into the Air Force inventory, and 37th FW operations from Tonopah required considerable logistics support, as all military personnel were permanently assigned to Nellis AFB, Nevada, and were transported once each week by air. Tactical Air Command also believed that, while Tonopah Airport was adequate for testing and development of aircraft, it was unsuitable as a fully operational tactical base. The Air Force also wanted to retire the F-15A/B Eagles operated by the 49th Fighter Wing at Holloman AFB, New Mexico, most of which were manufactured in the mid-1970s and were becoming expensive to operate. As a result, plans were put in place to construct suitable facilities for the F-117A at Holloman AFB and to retire the F-15A/B models of the 49th FW.

The official ceremony for the F-117A arrival at Holloman AFB was on May 9, 1992, and began the final exodus of the Air Force at Tonopah. On June 1, 1992, Det 1, 57 FWW moved from Tonopah to Nellis AFB. On July 8, the 37th FW was deactivated and the 415th FS, 416th FS, and 417th FS all became part of the 49th Fighter Wing. By August 1992, the TTR Airport was largely in caretaker status with many facilities mothballed.

=== Post 1992 ===
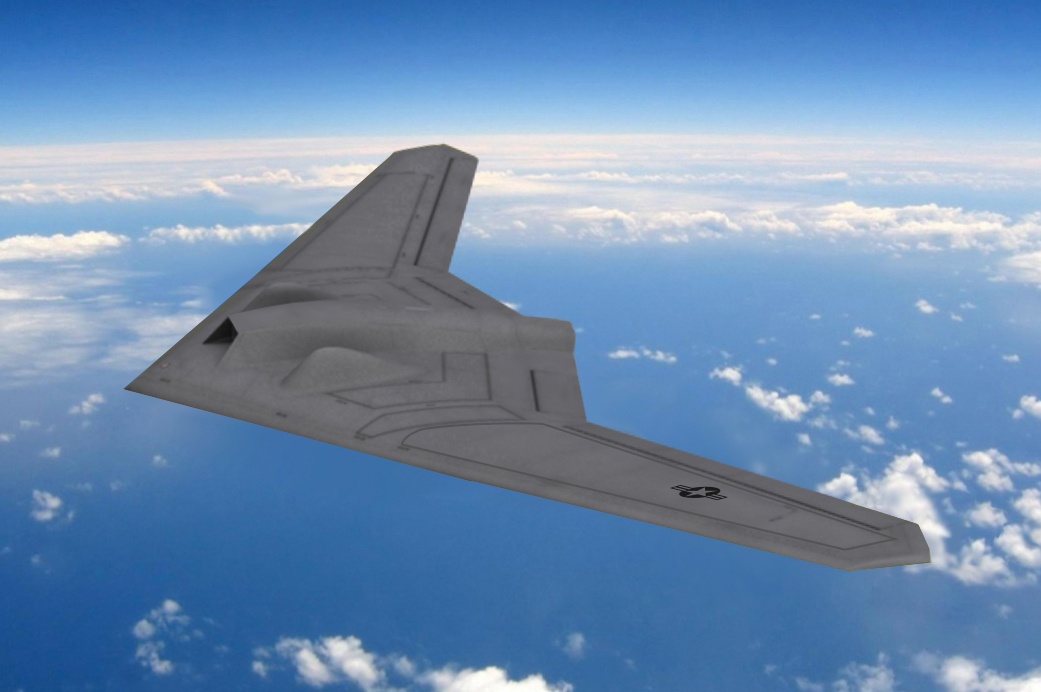
An artist's impression of a RQ-170 Sentinel

After 1992, very little was published about what, if any, aircraft were based there. The facility was placed on caretaker status effective 31 December 1992, however the USAF continued to maintain the runway as active along with the navigation aids remaining open to the DOE and the USAF on an as-needed basis.

In July 2001, a commercial McDonnell Douglas MD-82 aircraft landed at the Tonopah Test Range airfield due to a cargo fire warning light, according to an ASRS report. It departed without incident.

The 30th Reconnaissance Squadron, operating Predator Unmanned Aerial Vehicles, was activated at Tonopah in August 2005 as part of the 57th Operations Group at Nellis. On 1 July 2012 they were relocated to Creech Air Force Base in Nevada, where they remain. The squadron operates the USAF's RQ-170 Sentinel UAVs.

== Role and operations ==
Tonopah may be used by the Detachment 3, 53d Test and Evaluation Group for foreign aircraft evaluation testing.

=== F-117A storage ===
In 2008, the surviving fleet of 52 production F-117As were stored, with wings removed, in their original hangars at Tonopah. Since the aircraft still contain classified material, the Air Force was not able to mothball them in normal facilities, and use hangars at Tonopah instead. One of the mothballed Stealth Fighters is painted in “Gray Dragon” experimental camouflage. The last operational F-117A left Air Force Plant 42 at Palmdale, California, for Tonopah on 11 August 2008, marking the disbandment of the 410th Flight Test Squadron, the last operational F-117A squadron. Of these, one was scrapped to test effective methods of disposing of the fleet.

In 2010, four F-117A aircraft plus two maintenance spares are reportedly back in use for R&D purposes at Groom Lake, but the rest remain in storage at Tonopah. F-117s were seen flying in the Nevada skies in May 2013. F-117s have been spotted flying near Tonopah as recently as February 2019. In October 2020, a F-117A was spotted landing at MCAS Miramar in San Diego. Most recently, in February 2024, two F-117s were seen at testing range R-2508 in the Mojave Desert.

=== Department of Energy ===
The airfield continues to be used by the DOE in support of its mission at the Tonopah Test Range. The DOE facility supports approximately 15 flights per week for its operations. The remaining flights are in support of the USAF and other organizations at the Tonopah Test Range.

== Incidents ==
In 1979 at Tonopah there was a MiG-17 crash during training versus an F-5. Two other pilots of the 4477th died flying the Soviet planes.

Nighttime operations resulted in two F-117A losses due to spatial disorientation, one of the planes crashing 30 miles east of the airfield in October 1987. An F-117 based at Tonopah Test Range and piloted by Maj. Ross Mulhare crashed on July 11, 1986, near Bakersfield, California. Another F-117 piloted by Michael C. Stewart was lost on October 14, 1987, on the range about 30 miles east of the TTR Airfield, and it took the Air Force nearly a day to find the wreckage In both crashes the pilot was killed on impact, and both were attributed to fatigue and disorientation.

== See also ==
- Tonopah Air Force Station (Evaluation of Soviet "Barlock" Radar)
