= Tonopah Test Range =

Restricted military installation in Nevada

USAF Tonopah Test Range
- Nevada (South)
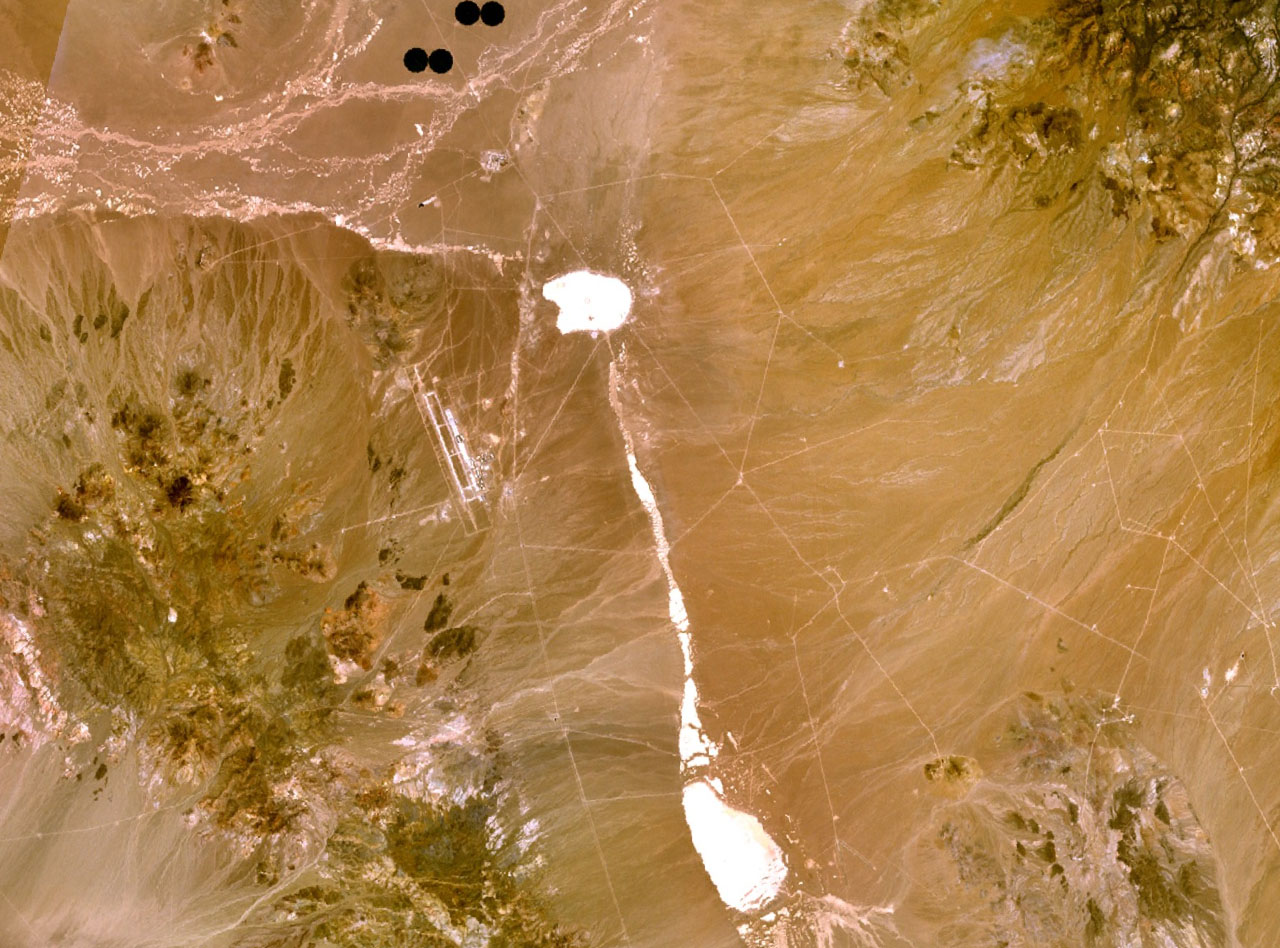
- Tonopah airbase and the surrounding test range (composite NASA Landsat-7 image)

Site information
- Type: Test Range
- Owner: United States Department of Energy
- Controlled by: United States Department of Energy DoE; United States Air Force USAF; Department Of Defense DoD; National Nuclear Security Administration NNSA and other Government Agencies
- Open to the public: No

Location
- Coordinates: 37.78°N 116.77°W

Site history
- Built: 1957

Garrison information
- Current commander: Classified
- Past commanders: Brian T. Adkins
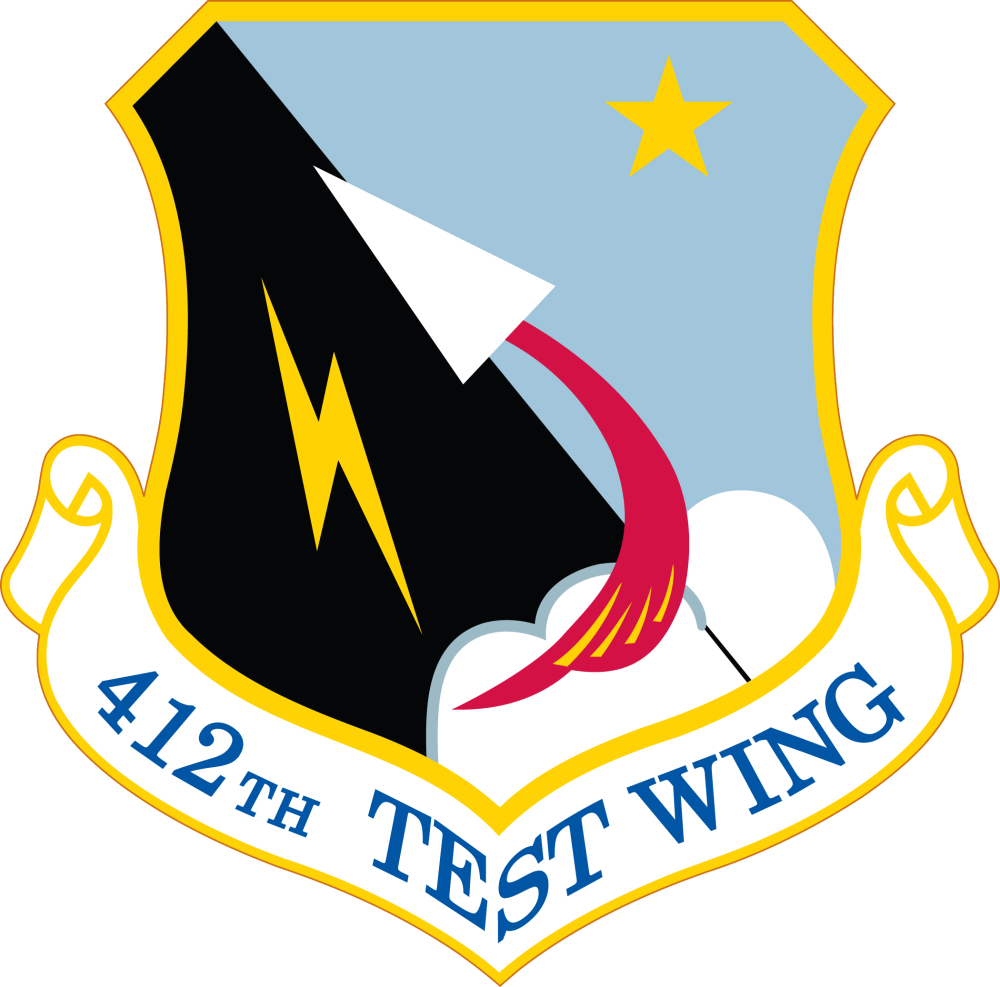
- Occupants: 412th Test Wing

The Tonopah Test Range (TTR, also designated as Area 52) is a highly classified, restricted military installation of the United States Department of Defense, and United States Department of Energy (nuclear stockpile stewardship) located about 30 miles (48 km) southeast of Tonopah, Nevada. It is part of the northern fringe of the Nellis Range, measuring 625 sq mi (1,620 km^{2}). Tonopah Test Range is located about 70 miles (110 km) northwest of Groom Lake, the home of the Area 51 facility.

Like the Groom Lake facility, Tonopah is a site of interest to conspiracy theorists, mostly for its use of experimental and classified aircraft. It is not generally the focus of alien enthusiasts, unlike its neighbor. It is currently used for nuclear weapons stockpile reliability testing, research and development of fusing and firing systems, and testing nuclear weapon delivery systems. The airspace comprises restricted area R-4809 of the Nevada Test and Training Range and is often used for military training.

== Description ==
The Tonopah Test Range is owned by the United States Department of Energy and is managed by Sandia National Laboratories, a division of Honeywell International, which operates the Tonopah Test Range under an Air Force permit with the National Nuclear Security Administration. The range is part of the Great Basin Desert and lies mostly within the Cactus Flat valley, consisting of horst and graben geology. It is flanked by the Cactus Peak hills to the west and the Kawich Peak to the east, which is home of Silverbow, one of the largest mining ghost towns in Nevada. The vegetation consists mostly of black sagebrush and creosote bush. It holds a sizable feral horse and burro population, closely monitored by the Bureau of Land Management. Common denizens of the TTR include the gray fox, pronghorn, coyote, and mule deer, along with the native birds sage thrasher, sage grouse, and sage sparrow.

=== Airfields ===
One of the primary facilities on the TTR is a large airfield (Area 10), consisting of a 12,000-foot (3,700 m) runway and numerous hangars. About five minor abandoned airfields exist throughout the TTR which were primarily used during World War II by units based at Tonopah Army Air Field (now serving as Tonopah's municipal airport). Only Mellan Airstrip, 11 miles (18 km) southeast of Tonopah Test Range Airport, survived past the 1960s, upgraded to a 5,000-foot (1,500 m) concrete runway. A US Air Force assessment published in 2000 indicated it was a minimally adequate airfield which was used to support tactical C-130 and C-17 training.

=== Mancamp ===
About six miles (10 km) north of the airfield is a large housing area called Mancamp. It contains about 50 twin-level dormitories, a recreation center, houses, a bar, a library, game room, weight room, Olympic size indoor pool, racquetball courts, a two-lane bowling alley, a barbecue pad, and an ATM. There are also an athletic track, tennis courts, and softball fields. Just outside Mancamp a small civilian compound existed, but was mostly dismantled by 2000. Google Earth imagery indicated that Mancamp's streets were renovated sometime between 2003 and 2007.

=== Sandia National Laboratories ===
Operations by Sandia are controlled at the TTR Operations Control Center (Area 3), just southeast of the main airfield, which houses the range safety officer, test director, and key engineers. Activities are monitored with video, high-speed cameras, and radar tracking devices. Though nuclear weapons have never been detonated on the TTR, the 1963 test Project Rollercoaster involved the destruction of four weapons, which caused some plutonium to be dispersed into the soil north of Antelope Lake.

== History ==
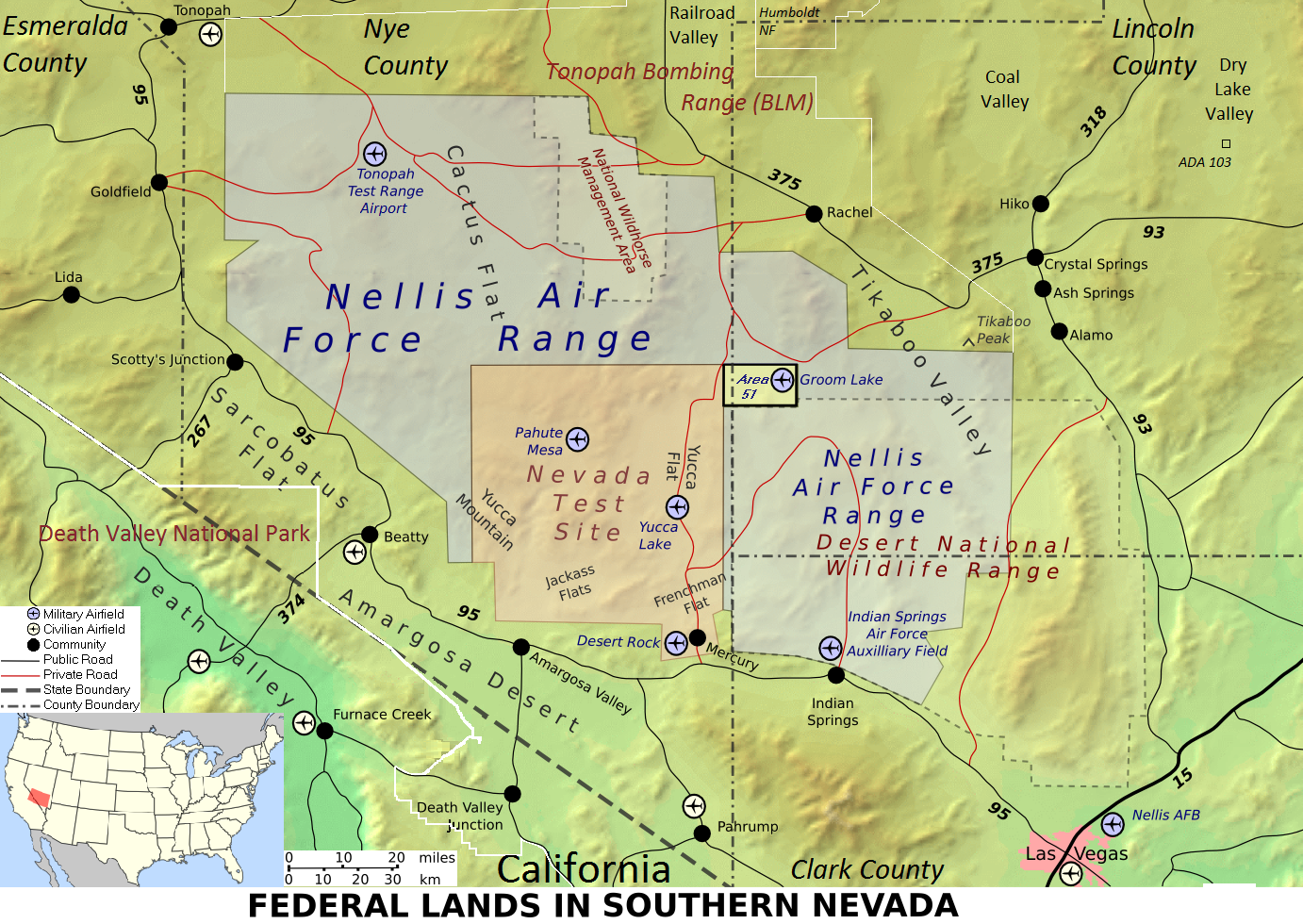
Map showing Tonopah Test Range and related federal lands in southern Nevada

In the early 20th century, the region was used primarily for mining and some grazing. Early maps from the 1930s indicated a roadway connecting the towns of Caliente and Tonopah via Rachel, which ascended Cedar Pass and crossed through the northern part of the future Tonopah Test Range. In 1940, President Franklin D. Roosevelt directed the establishment of a US Army Air Corps training range in this area. During the 1950s, weapons design research had been conducted largely at the Salton Sea testing base, but haze problems forced the Department of Energy to seek another location. The Tonopah Test Range was withdrawn from public use in 1956, and testing began in 1957 for United States Department of Energy weapons programs. For most of its life, the range was administered by Sandia National Laboratories. In 2008, the National Nuclear Security Administration proposed to move its facilities on the Tonopah Test Range to White Sands Missile Range, a move that local and state politicians say would cost the area jobs and lost revenue.

=== Constant Peg ===
From 1979 to 1988, Tonopah hosted a MiG air combat training program code named Constant Peg. The brainchild of Colonel Gail Peck, the program was run by the 4477th Test & Evaluation Squadron, "Red Eagles", and allowed American aircrews the opportunity to fly – and to fly against – the fighter aircraft of their Cold War rivals. Constant Peg was formally declassified on November 15, 2006, though it had been discussed by name in various media since the mid-1980s. At the height of the operation, the Red Eagles flew 14 Mikoyan-Gurevich MiG-21s and 9 Mikoyan-Gurevich MiG-23s (with additional airframes of both types available for cannibalization), and had also operated the Mikoyan-Gurevich MiG-17 until 1982, when the type proved too dangerous to continue flying. Between July 1979 and its final sortie in March 1988, 5,930 aircrew were exposed to Constant Peg.

=== Stealth ===
F-117s of the 4450th Tactical Group operated from Tonopah in secret from 1982 through 1989 while the program was still classified. During this period Mancamp was connected to the airfield by shuttle bus service, while the airfield in turn was connected to Nellis Air Force Base by between five and twenty Key Airlines Boeing 727 and/or Boeing 737 flights per day (under contract) from Nellis to Tonopah. The airfield was also by one or two Janet Boeing 737 flights daily, which were presumably from McCarran International Airport and served Sandia National Laboratories employees. In early 1991, Key Air lost the contract and the service was taken over by American Trans Air Boeing 727 aircraft. Key Air departed directly from Nellis AFB, and did not utilize McCarran International, as it was too far a distance from the base, and impractical.

=== Contamination ===
It was revealed in 2007 that during the 1980s a contractor had dumped up to 1,000 pounds of urea at a pond on the TTR, resulting in the die-off of 61 horses in 1988. The fluid had been used as a de-icing agent. The Bureau of Land Management investigated in November 1988, and imposed remedial actions and assessed a $15,000 fine. In 2007 over concerns that the chemical was infiltrating groundwater, a whistleblower unsuccessfully attempted to get the Environmental Protection Agency to intervene, leading to an August 2007 inquiry with the Department of the Interior by Senator Harry Reid.

=== S-300PS SAM testing ===
The TTR has also been the site of US testing of foreign-made surface-to-air missile systems. Satellite imagery confirms the US secretly acquiring the Russian made S-300PS surface-to-air missile system from an unknown supplier in order to test UAVs as well as other advanced aircraft based at nearby airbases. According to OSGEOINT, these bases include Creech Air Force Base, the Yucca Lake UAV testing facility, and Nellis Air Force Base, operating the MQ-9 Reaper, RQ-170, and the F-35 Joint Strike Fighter in addition to other aircraft. The testing of aircraft is executed under the direction of the 53rd Wing Test and Evaluation Group based at Nellis.

== Popular culture ==
- Area 52 has been featured in newscasts by television stations such as KLAS.
- Area 52 has also been featured on The History Channel's UFO Hunters, in which it is speculated to facilitate the use of highly advanced aircraft technology, including craft such as flying saucers or UFOs.
- In the television series Stargate SG-1, Area 52 is actually the US Treasury's code designation for Stargate Command.
- In an episode of Total Drama World Tour, Area 52 is visited right before the contestants get to Area 51.
- In the Warner Bros. movie Looney Tunes Back in Action, Bugs Bunny and Daffy Duck visit a secret military base in the Nevada Desert, used mainly as a storage for extraterrestrial lifeforms and technology and government secrets, called Area 52. In the movie, this base is the "real" Area 51, and the name "Area 51" is only a cover for Area 52.
- In the popular MMORPG World of Warcraft, Area 52 is a playable area within the game where the player-controlled avatar may visit and participate in various activities. Located throughout the area are various pop-culture references to Area 51, extraterrestrial lifeforms, the Men in Black (franchise), and Star Trek. Further, there is a realm bearing the same name.

== See also ==
- Dugway Proving Ground
- Aberdeen Proving Ground
- Air Force Flight Test Center
- Naval Air Weapons Station China Lake
- Nevada Test Site
