= Janet (airline) =

Classified US military transport fleet

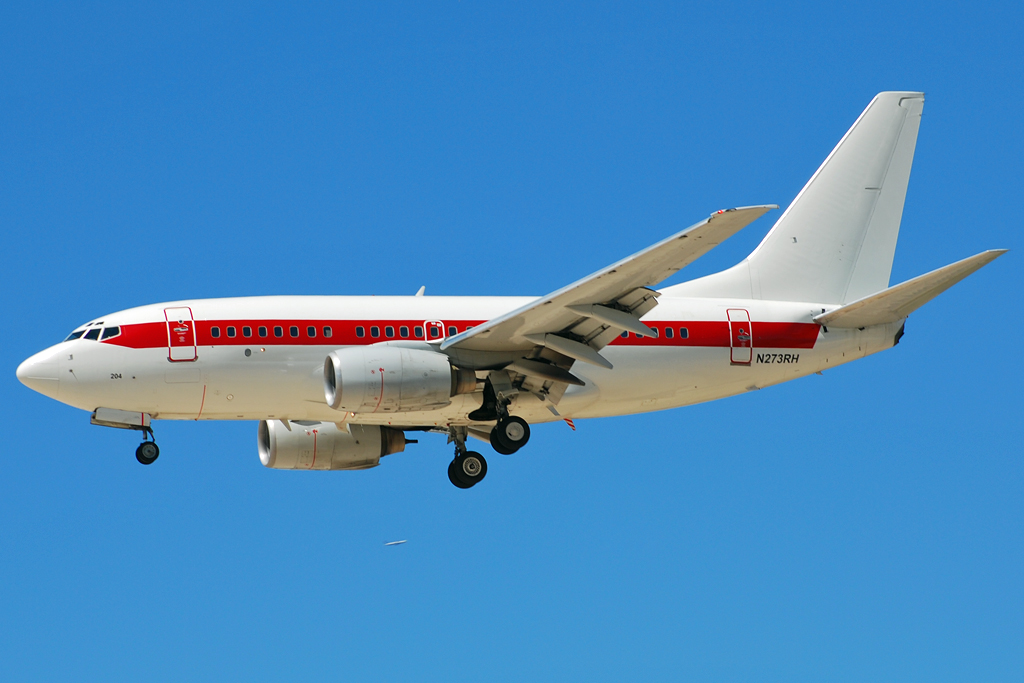
- Janet 737-600 (2010)
IATA	ICAO	Call sign
—	WWW	JANET
- Commenced operations: March 1972; Paradise, Nevada, U.S.
- Hubs: Harry Reid International Airport
- Focus cities: Tonopah Test Range; Homey Airport
- Fleet size: 11
- Destinations: 6
- Parent company: Department of the Air Force (DAF)
- Headquarters: Las Vegas, Nevada, U.S.

"Janet" or "Janet Airlines" is an informal nickname for a highly classified fleet of passenger aircraft operated for the United States Department of the Air Force as an employee shuttle to transport staff to secure sites in southern Nevada known as Special Access Program Facilities (SAPF). The aircraft are generally unmarked aside from a horizontal red cheatline along the aircraft's windows. It is uncertain where the Janet nickname originated, but the flights date back to 1972.

The aircraft operate from a private terminal at Harry Reid International Airport in Las Vegas. These flights carry military personnel, Department of Defense (DoD) civilians, and contractor employees. The airline mainly serves the Nevada Test and Training Range (NTTR) (most notably Area 51 and the Tonopah Test Range)

== History ==
Area 51 was established in 1955 by the Central Intelligence Agency at Groom Lake in Nevada to serve as a secure test site for the Lockheed U-2, a high‑altitude reconnaissance aircraft developed under deep secrecy. The remote desert location allowed engineers and pilots to test the aircraft’s capabilities far from public view. To support operations at Area 51, regular flights were established to transport military and civilian personnel to the site from McCarran International Airport in Las Vegas.

The earliest known Janet flights were operated from 1972 by defense contractor EG&G, which supported the Atomic Energy Commission in the development of nuclear weapons at the Nevada Test Site. Flights were initially conducted by a single Douglas DC-6B (registration N6583C), which was later joined by a second aircraft in 1976.

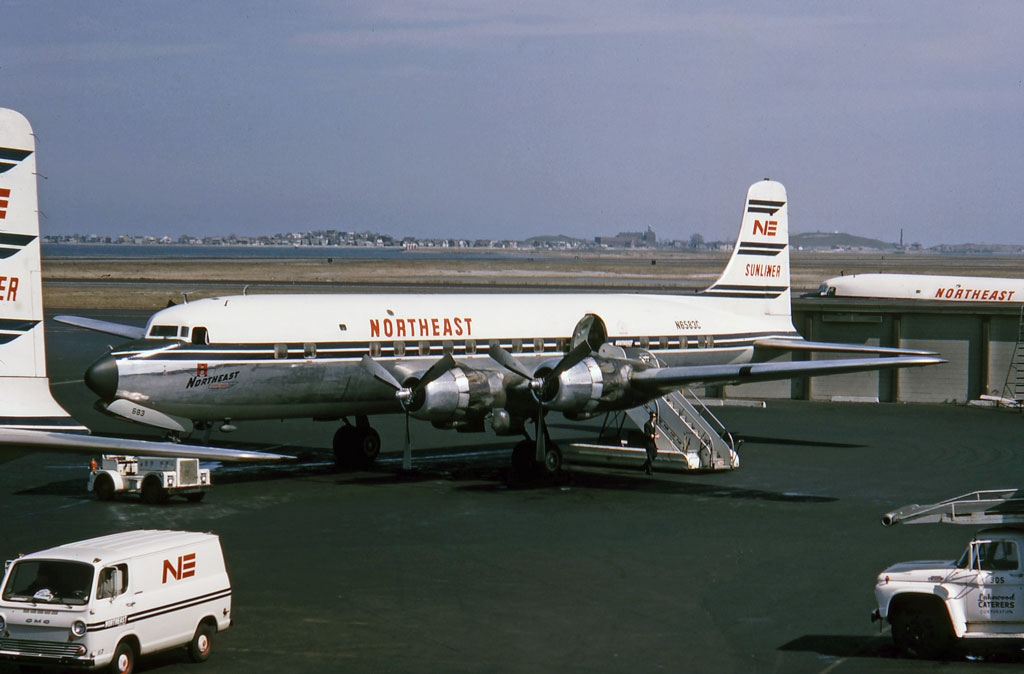
Douglas DC-6B N6583C in 1966 operating with Northeast Airlines, prior to its transfer to the Janet fleet in 1972

According to a former Area 51 employee, the Janet name is said to have originated from Richard "Dick" Sampson, the CIA officer who oversaw Area 51 from 1969 to 1971. Sampson casually assigned his wife's given name as the air traffic control call sign for the flights. The nickname stuck, and Janet eventually became the informal name for the entire operation. Other theories surmise that Janet is an acronym for "Just Another Non-Existent Terminal" or "Joint Air Network for Employee Transportation".

The 1980s saw the expansion of the fleet with the introduction of the Boeing 737-200, a first generation variant of the airliner. Three aircraft were delivered in 1980, which allowed the two DC-6B to be retired in 1981. A further 737 was delivered in 1983 and three more in 1984, one of which left the fleet in 1986.

The fleet was later supplemented by Air Force T-43s de-modified to conventional transport configurations.

In November 2023, it was reported the U.S. Air Force was looking for a new civilian contractor to operate the Janet fleet. Their solicitation specified that a potential new operator would have to operate up to 190 flights per week.

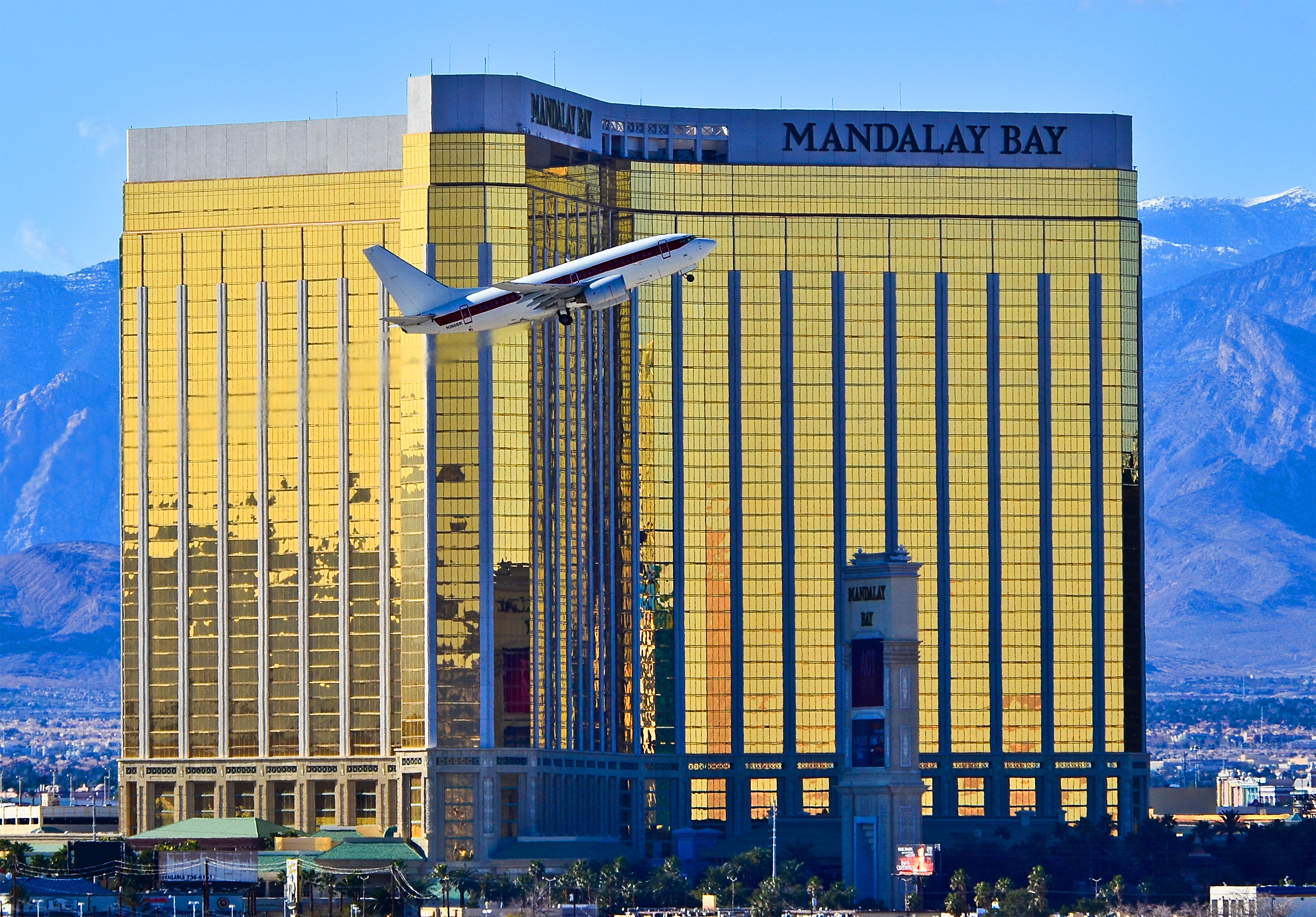
A Janet Boeing 737-66N taking off, with Mandalay Bay in the background

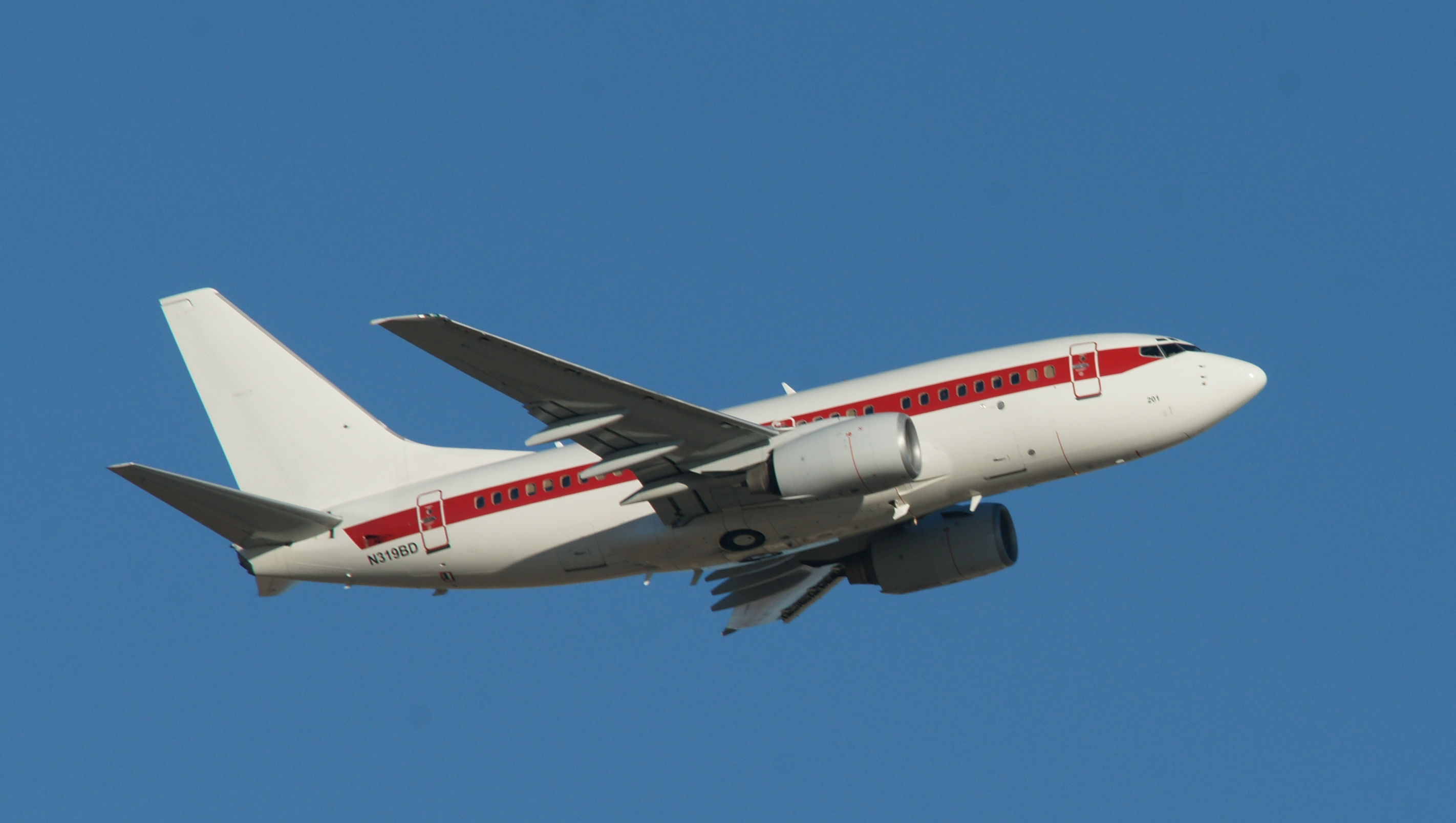
A Janet Boeing 737-600

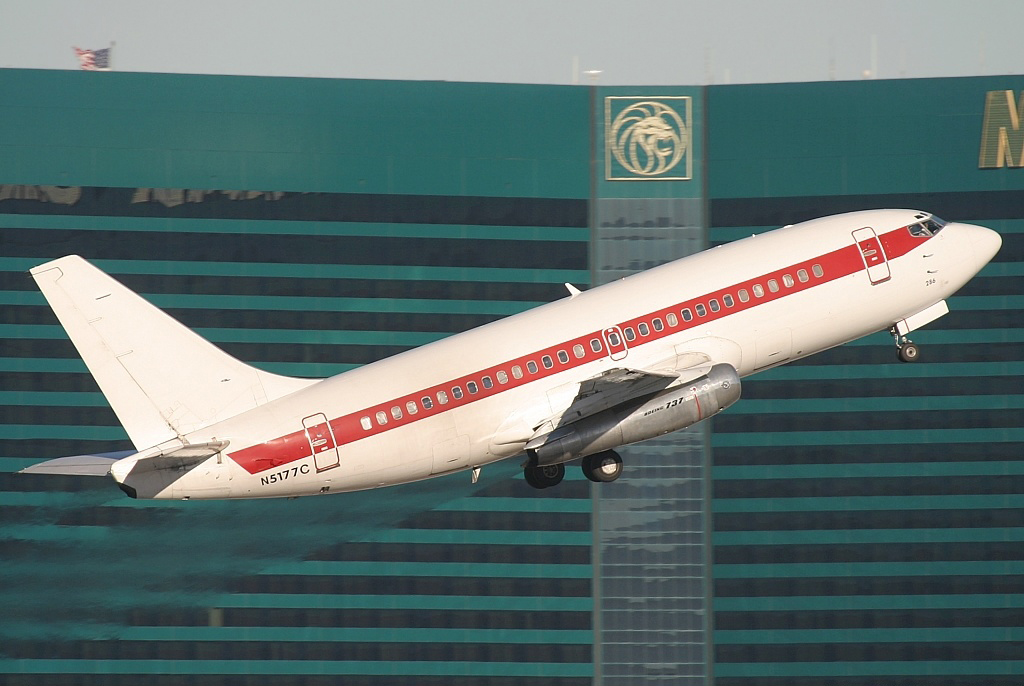
A Janet 737-200 departing from Harry Reid International Airport, Las Vegas, Nevada with the MGM Grand Las Vegas in the background

== Operations ==
Due to the airline's secretive nature, little is known about its organization. As of January 2023, it is operated for the USAF by infrastructure and defense contractor Amentum through the company's acquisition of AECOM's defense contracting ventures. Originally the service was operated by EG&G, and later URS Corporation; this is mainly known as a result of periodic job openings published by URS and AECOM. For example, in 2010, URS announced it would be hiring Boeing 737 flight attendants to be based in Las Vegas, requiring applicants to undergo a Single Scope Background Investigation in order to be able to obtain a security clearance.

Janet airlines boards at a standalone terminal on the west side of Harry Reid International Airport.

Janet flights operate with a three-digit flight number with a WWW prefix. In the official publication of ICAO airline codes, this specific three-letter designator is listed as being blocked. The primary airline callsign is simply "Janet", though flights transition to alternate callsigns, called Groom callsigns, once transferred over to Groom Lake from Nellis control. The name often changes, and the number will be the last 2 digits of the flight number plus 15. For example, a flight originating with callsign Janet 412 would be given a callsign similar to Bunny 27 when transferred to Groom Lake control.

=== Destination codes ===
Janet Airlines uses special codes for its destinations. Even the location identifier frequently used as a destination or departure field - TKM (or KTKM internationally) - is not an ICAO code for an airport, but is likely used for Area 51. This location identifier is listed as a tie-in facility for "Tonopah Test Range Base Ops" in FAA documentation as recently as 2020. Not all destination codes are known, but the following are listed:

Airport	Code
U.S. Air Force Production Flight Test Installation (Plant 42)	Station 1
Area 51	Station 3
Basecamp	Station 6
Tonopah Test Range	Station 7
Janet Terminal (Harry Reid International Airport)	Station 9

=== Destinations ===
Janet destinations, mostly military, include:

Janet Airlines destinations
Country	State	City	Airport	Airport codes			Notes	Refs
Country	State	City	Airport	IATA	ICAO	FAA LID	Notes	Refs
United States	California	Palmdale	U.S. Air Force Production Flight Test Installation (Plant 42)	PMD	KPMD	PMD	Also known as Palmdale Regional Airport, as they share the same runway.	
United States	California	China Lake	Naval Air Weapons Station China Lake	—	KNID	NID		
United States	California	Edwards	Edwards Air Force Base	EDW	KEDW	EDW	Janet Airlines services the north base.	
United States	Nevada	Groom Lake	Homey Airport	—	KXTA	—	More commonly known as Area 51.	
United States	Nevada	Las Vegas	Harry Reid International Airport	LAS	KLAS	LAS	Hub	
United States	Nevada	Tonopah	Tonopah Test Range	XSD	KTNX	TNX		

Along with these destinations, there have been reports of Janet Airlines filing flight plans to many other airports.

== Fleet ==
As of August 2025, Janet operates the following aircraft:

- 1 Beechcraft 1900C

As of 2015, the Janet fleet consists of six Boeing 737-600s painted white with a prominent red cheatline. The fleet is registered to the Department of the Air Force (DAF), while some earlier aircraft were registered to several civil aircraft leasing corporations. Before the arrival of the 737-600s, Janet operated Boeing 737-200s, some of which were modified from military T-43A aircraft. One of the 737-200s with registration N5177C in the 1980s was briefly based in Germany at Frankfurt International Airport (which was at the time also home to a USAF base, Rhein-Main Air Base), and operated by Keyway Air Transport, apparently a front company for a US government operation. It was retired on 6 March 2009. Together with the other 737-200s, it was sent to AMARG at Davis–Monthan Air Force Base in Arizona for storage.

All Janet 737-600 aircraft were acquired from Air China, and four were previously operated by the now-defunct China Southwest Airlines before being acquired for US Air Force operations starting in 2008. The aircraft were initially taken to Wright-Patterson Air Force Base before being transferred to Las Vegas.

One aircraft, a Beechcraft 1900, was lost on 16 March 2004, when it crashed on approach for Tonopah Test Range Airport after the pilot suffered sudden cardiac arrest. Five people were killed in the accident, including the pilot.

Current Janet Airlines fleet
Type	Serial number	Tail number	C/N	Owner	Notes	Refs
Boeing 737-66N	28649	N319BD	887	United States Department of the Air Force		
Boeing 737-66N	28650	N869HH	932	United States Department of the Air Force		
Boeing 737-66N	28652	N859WP	938	United States Department of the Air Force		
Boeing 737-66N	29890	N273RH	1276	United States Department of the Air Force		
Boeing 737-66N	29891	N365SR	1294	United States Department of the Air Force		
Boeing 737-66N	29892	N288DP	1305	United States Department of the Air Force		
Beechcraft B200C	BL-54	N654BA	—	United States Department of the Air Force		
Beechcraft B200C	BL-61	N661BA	—	United States Department of the Air Force		
Beechcraft B200C	BL-62	N662BA	—	United States Department of the Air Force		
Beechcraft B300C	FL-93	N989RR	—	United States Department of the Air Force		
Beechcraft B300C	FL-95	N910CB	—	United States Department of the Air Force		

Former Janet Airlines fleet
Type	Serial number	Tail number	C/N	Owner	Fate	Retired	Refs
Beechcraft 1900C	UB-37	N27RA	—	United States Department of the Air Force	Crash	16 March 2004	
Boeing 737-275	20785	N4529W	335	United States Department of the Air Force	Retired	7 November 2008	
Boeing 737-253	20694	N5294M	343	United States Department of the Air Force	Retired	26 January 2009	
Boeing 737-253	20693	N5177C	340	United States Department of the Air Force	Retired	6 March 2009	
Boeing 737-253	20691	N5294E	337	United States Department of the Air Force	Retired	17 April 2009	
Boeing 737-253	20692	N5176Y	339	United States Department of the Air Force	Retired	17 July 2009	
Boeing 737-253	20689	N5175U	334	United States Department of the Air Force	Retired	10 August 2009	
Douglas DC-6B	45219	N6583C	—	EG&G	Retired	October 1981	

== Accidents ==
Aircraft	Crash site	Damage	Route		Description	Time	Fatalities	Refs
Aircraft	Crash site	Damage	Origin	Destination	Description	Time	Fatalities	Refs
Beech 1900C; N27RA	7 miles (11 km) southeast of Tonopah Test Range Airport	W/O	—	Tonopah Test Range Airport	During approach, the pilot reported runway-in-sight, and entered a circle pattern. The pilot then became incapacitated due to sudden cardiac arrest. During the turn, the plane entered a dive before crashing into the ground and bursting into flames as its fuel load ignited. It was later revealed the pilot suffered from high blood pressure, and had neglected to report it.	16 March 2004, 04:01	All 5 occupants	
