= Have Doughnut =

United States MiG-21 evaluation project

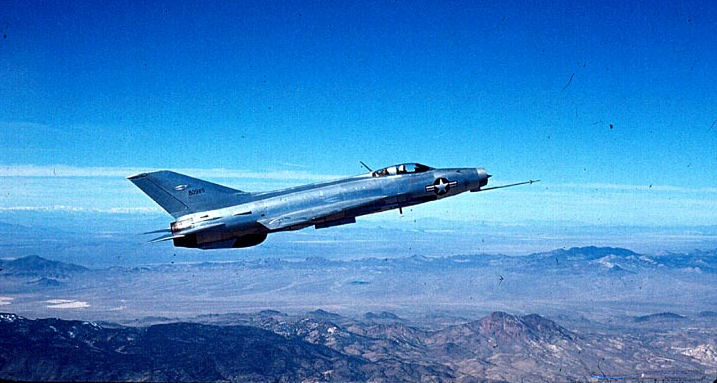
Have Doughnut flying in 1968

NASIC document describing the program

Have Doughnut was a Defense Intelligence Agency project whose purpose was to evaluate and exploit a MiG-21 "Fishbed-E" that the United States Air Force acquired in 1967 from Israel. Israel acquired the aircraft as the result of its Operation Diamond when, on August 16, 1966, Iraqi Air Force pilot Capt. Munir Redfa, in a defection pre-arranged by the Israeli Mossad intelligence agency, flew it to Israel during a training flight.

In this multi-service project, Air Force and United States Navy pilots evaluated the MiG-21, redesignated as the "YF-110", in a variety of situations. The aircraft was referred to as "The Doughnut" due to the doughnut-shaped intake at the aircraft nose; this led to the project name "Have Doughnut". The inability of the Navy to disseminate the results of this highly classified project to combat pilots was part of the impetus to create the United States Navy Fighter Weapons School. The Have Doughnut tests were conducted at Groom Lake. A similar project occurred a year later known as Have Drill, which used a MiG-17 Fresco acquired in the same manner.

Intelligence obtained during Have Doughnut was used to create the classified training film "Throw A Nickel On The Grass", which was used to brief US Air Force and US Navy pilots deploying to Vietnam on the capabilities and weaknesses of the MiG-21. This film has since been declassified and uploaded to YouTube.

== See also ==
- Constant Peg
