= 4477th Test and Evaluation Squadron =

Squadron in the US Air Force

4477th Test & Evaluation Squadron
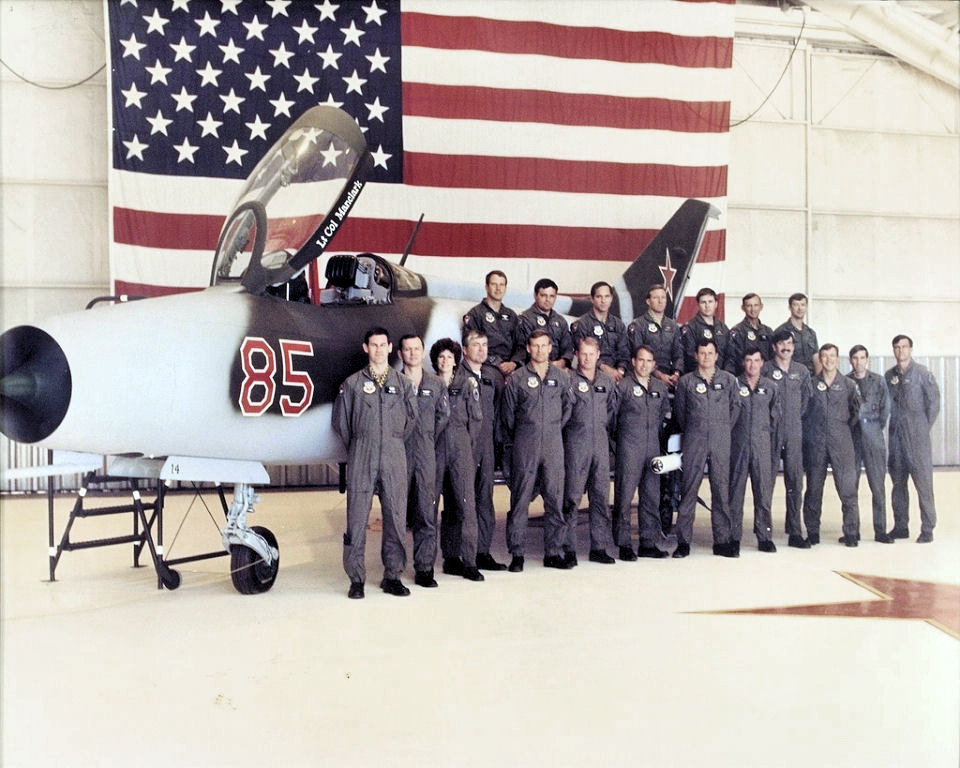
- Members of the 4477th Test & Evaluation Squadron in front of a MiG-21F-13 Fishbed C/E, "85 Red", USAF serial 014. This airframe is now displayed at the Air Force Armament Museum, Eglin AFB, Florida.
- Active: 1 May 1980–15 July 1990
- Disbanded: Last sorties on 4 March 1988.
- Country: United States
- Branch: United States Air Force
- Type: Flight/Squadron
- Role: Foreign Technology Evaluation
- Garrison/HQ: Air Force Flight Test Center (Detachment 3), Nevada; Tonopah Test Range Airport, Nevada
- Nickname: Red Eagles

Commanders
- Notable commanders: Gaillard Peck; George Gennin

Insignia
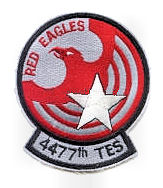
- Emblem of the 4477th Test and Evaluation Squadron. Regular Patch

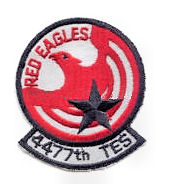
- Emblem of the 4477th Test and Evaluation Squadron (Subdued or camouflaged)

Aircraft flown
- Fighter: Mikoyan-Gurevich MiG-17, Mikoyan-Gurevich MiG-21 and Mikoyan-Gurevich MiG-23.
- Trainer: Northrop T-38 Talon
- Transport: Cessna 404, Mitsubishi MU-2

The 4477th Test and Evaluation Squadron (4477 TES), known as the "Red Eagles", was a squadron in the United States Air Force that operated MiG-17s, MiG-21s and MiG-23s between 1977 and 1988.

The mission of the squadron, operating under project Constant Peg, was to expose the tactical air forces of the United States to the flight characteristics of fighter aircraft used by the Soviet Union and other adversary nations during the Cold War. During the course of its existence the squadron exposed approximately 6,000 aircrew of the United States Air Force, United States Navy, and United States Marine Corps to these aircraft types in a controlled training environment.

The last training sorties of the squadron were flown in 1988, however the declassified history of the squadron shows that it was not formally disbanded until July 1990.

While the squadron is currently inactive, operation of Soviet- and Russian-built aircraft types by the US continues, and aircrew have been observed wearing Red Eagles patches as recently as 2017.

== History ==
The United States is known to have conducted test flying of Soviet-built aircraft for intelligence gathering and evaluation purposes dating back to the Yakovlev Yak-23 in 1953. This effort continued throughout the Cold War and into the 21st century, and while many projects remain classified, aircraft types including the Mikoyan MiG-29 and Sukhoi Su-27 aircraft have been photographed in flight above the Nevada desert.

The first systematic evaluation of a Soviet-built aircraft in the United States was carried out on a MiG-21F-13 “Fishbed-E” under project Have Doughnut. This aircraft was acquired from Israel in 1967 following the defection of an Iraqi pilot to Israel in 1966, and was thoroughly evaluated at Groom Lake during the late 1960s.

Further aircraft were secretly acquired and studied during the late 1960s and early 1970s, with evaluation taking place at Groom Lake under the control of Air Force Systems Command. During this period each new aircraft to be made available was designated a specific project name in the “Have” series.

In 1970 the range of Soviet-built foreign materiel evaluation projects at Groom Lake was reorganised under the single umbrella project Have Glib. The 6512th Test Group at Edwards Air Force Base was designated the responsible test organisation, and a local detachment, the 6512th Test Squadron Special Projects Branch (known as the “Red Hats”) was formed to operate the Have Glib aircraft.

In 1973 Have Glib was redesignated as Have Idea. The Red Hats continued as the sole operators of Soviet-built aircraft at Groom Lake until 1977.

=== Origins of Constant Peg ===
Experience from the Vietnam War showed that training in air-to-air tactics and weapons employment among frontline squadrons was not adequate to deal with the threat from North Vietnamese Air Force. The US Navy carried out a sweeping review of these deficiencies under the Ault Report, which along with the US Air Force’s Project Red Baron study led to a massive expansion of air-to-air training for aircrew. These studies also showed that US aircrew were not prepared for maneuvring combat with the smaller and lighter MiG-17s and MiG-21s supplied to North Vietnam by the Soviet Union, and that awareness of the capabilities of these adversary aircraft was lacking.

As the inventory of Soviet-built aircraft at Groom Lake grew during the 1970s, and as concerns around the possible loss of unique assets before intelligence capture could be completed were replaced by increased confidence in the maintainability and availability of these assets, it became possible to directly expose an increasing number of US Air Force and US Navy pilots to Soviet-built aircraft

Under Have Glib and Have Idea individual USAF Aggressor pilots were permitted to fly the MiGs at Groom Lake as part of their training, and USAF Fighter Weapons Instructor Course and USN Fighter Weapons School students were also allotted sorties against the MiGs to maximise their understanding of adversary aircraft. However, this training was limited by the number of available aircraft, and each training sortie for an operational pilot required the approval of Air Force Systems Command as administrative owner of the assets.

It was also recognised that while the aircraft used by Aggressor squadrons (primarily the A-4 to simulate the MiG-17 and the F-5 to simulate the MiG-21) were good representations of Soviet-built aircraft, they did not duplicate the performance of these aircraft in all regards. The MiG simulators also could not prepare pilots for the psychological shock of encountering an unfamiliar and exotic adversary aircraft for the first time, referred to as “buck fever”, and a group of Air Force officers briefed on the various exploitation programmes began privately discussing the possibility of enlarging the fleet of Soviet-built aircraft to support large-scale exposure to operational squadrons.

In late 1976 USAF Colonel Gail Peck, a veteran of Vietnam in the F-4 who had flown the MiG-17 and MiG-21 at Groom Lake and supported more widespread use of the aircraft, proposed that an Aggressor squadron of Soviet-built aircraft should be created for the express purpose of training front line squadrons. This idea won the support of USAF General Hoyt S. Vandenberg Jr, and resulted in the launch of project "Constant Peg," named after Vandenberg's callsign, "Constant," and Peck's wife, Peggy.

=== Establishment of the 4477th TEF and initial MiG fleet ===
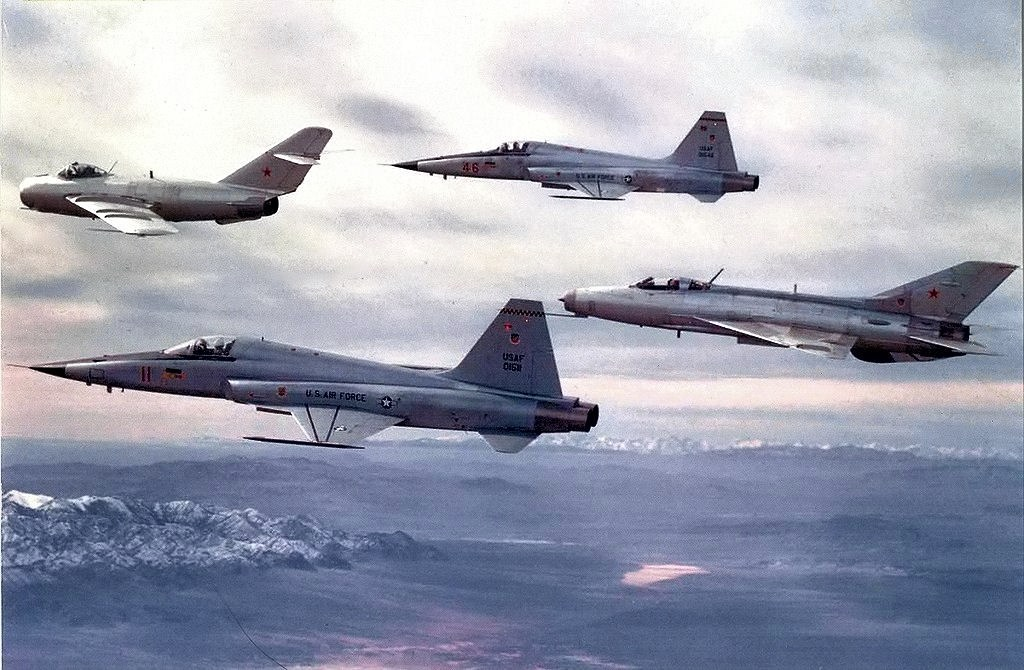
Two USAF F-5Es flanking a MiG-17 and MiG-21 of the 4477th Test and Evaluation Squadron

The 4477th Test and Evaluation Flight was established by Tactical Air Command (TAC) on 1 April 1977 as part of the 57th Fighter Weapons Wing. The new organisation, named "Red Eagles" from its inception, would be dedicated to providing training exposures of Soviet-built fighter aircraft to front line US aircrew. The project would be funded jointly by the US Air Force and the US Navy, with pilots drawn from the US Air Force, US Navy, and US Marine Corps, and exposures would be provided to aircrew from all three services.

Two MiG-17s and two MiG-21s previously operated under Have Idea were transferred to the 4477th to support this mission.

Responsibility for evaluation of Soviet-built aircraft for intelligence purposes remained with the Red Hats under Air Force Systems Command. To reflect the refocusing of the Red Hats’ mission purely towards the study of these aircraft, and to recognise the increasing scale of this mission both in the US and around the world, the 6512th Test Squadron Special Projects Branch was elevated to squadron status with the activation of the 6513th Test Squadron in December 1977.

While work began to expand the inventory of flyable MiGs to support Constant Peg, the Red Eagles and the Red Hats shared the aircraft and facilities at Groom Lake. The first training sorties of the 4477th TEF were flown from Groom Lake in 1978

The two MiG-17s initially used in Constant Peg were the aircraft used in Have Ferry, originally sourced from Syria via Israel, and a MiG-17PF from an undetermined source.

The two MiG-21s initially used in Constant Peg were the Have Doughnut aircraft sourced from Iraq via Israel, and an aircraft assembled from a batch of MiG-21s sourced from Indonesia. Indonesia had been a client state of the Soviet Union during the 1960s, but following a change in government in 1967 in reaction to a Communist coup attempt, the two countries broke off relations and aircraft initially supplied by the Soviets were grounded for lack of spares. As the new President Suharto forged closer ties with the West, arrangements were made for Indonesia to transfer their fleet of MiG-21s to the US in exchange for military aid.

The condition of the MiG-21s sourced from Indonesia on receipt at Groom Lake was poor, with the aircraft having been neglected following their grounding. At least one aircraft eventually returned to flight was reported to have been recovered from a drainage ditch, having been immersed in water up to the canopy rails for several years. Nonetheless, at least five Indonesian MiG-21s were eventually returned to flight and put into service with the 4477th.

=== Move to Tonopah and fleet expansion ===
In order to avoid infringing on the range of highly classified test programmes taking place at Groom Lake, Constant Peg required a dedicated base of operations. At a meeting between Gail Peck and Colonel Bobby Bond, then working for Air Force Systems Command in the Pentagon, Peck was briefed on the Have Blue stealth demonstrator programme and the likelihood of that programme developing into an operational but deeply secret aircraft, which eventually emerged as the F-117 Nighthawk under project Senior Trend. The men recognised that these two “black” Air Force programmes shared similar requirements for an isolated and highly secure operating base, and that to co-locate these projects would save on infrastructure costs.

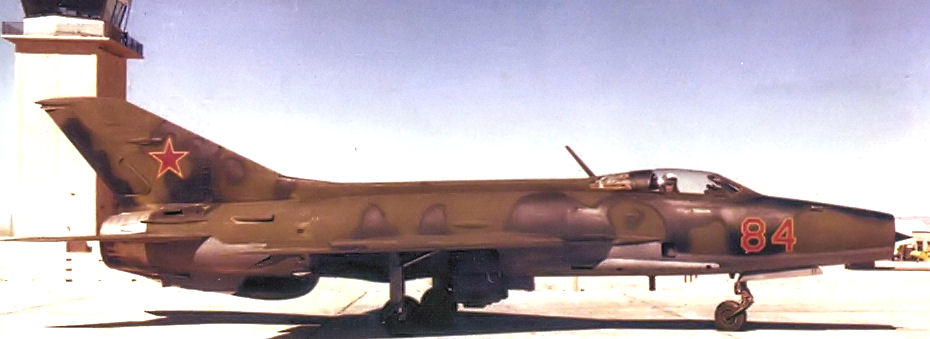
"Red 84" MiG-21F-13 taxiing past the Tonopah control tower, 1986

Following a search for suitable sites, the Tonopah Test Range airfield was selected as the home for both Constant Peg and Senior Trend. Owned and operated by the Atomic Energy Commission, Tonopah was ideally suited to the requirements of both projects, but would require extensive development to be made suitable for squadron-scale operations.

Development of the airfield took place through 1977 and 1978, with the 4477th TEF flying their first operational sorties from Tonopah in July 1979. By this time the fleet of available MiGs had increased to two MiG-17s and six MiG-21s, with the additional MiG-21s all having been rebuilt from examples delivered from Indonesia.

One MiG-17 was lost in a fatal accident following a spin in August 1979. Additional examples were sourced, but after another MiG-17 was destroyed after an engine failure during takeoff in April 1982, the type was retired from service.

=== Consolidation as 4477th TES and introduction of the MiG-23 ===
On April 1st 1980, the 4477th Test and Evaluation Flight was administratively upgraded to the 4477th Test and Evaluation Squadron. The 4477th TES introduced the MiG-23 to their fleet in November 1980.

The MiG-23s used in CONSTANT PEG were primarily sourced from Egypt. As with Indonesia, Egypt had been a Soviet client state that pivoted towards the West following the death of Abdel Nasser and the succession of Anwar Sadat in 1970, making a large amount of Soviet materiel available for exploitation. Eighteen examples of the MiG-23, split between the MiG-23MS Flogger E (air-to-air version) and the MiG-23BN Flogger F (air-to-ground version), were acquired by the CIA in exchange for military aid and transported to the US. Individual examples were returned to flight for evaluation by the Red Hats, and ten Egyptian MiG-23s were put into service with the 4477th for use in Constant Peg.

One MiG-23 was lost in a fatal accident following an engine failure in 1982, and a second was lost following a spin in 1987 with the pilot ejecting safely. An additional MiG-23 was obtained from an unknown source in 1988 to replace the airframe lost in 1987.

=== MiG-21 fleet expansion with Chinese F-7B ===
Between 1982 and 1984 a batch of nine Chengdu F-7B aircraft (a Chinese licence-built derivative of the MiG-21 also known as the Shenyang J-7B) was purchased from China during a period of military cooperation. Eight of these aircraft were used to supplement the Red Eagles’ fleet of Indonesian MiG-21s, and one was evaluated by the Red Hats at Groom Lake.

While there were detail differences between the MiG-21F-13 Fishbed-E and the F-7B, the appearance and performance of the two aircraft was extremely similar. The primary visual difference is that the MiG-21 used a single-piece, forward-hinging canopy, while the F-7B used a fixed windscreen with a canopy hinging to the rear.

A second batch of twelve F-7Bs was delivered in 1987, allowing the last of the MiG-21F-13s sourced from Indonesia to be retired in the summer of that year. Considering the largely unknown service history of the Indonesian MiG-21s, along with their poor condition on delivery and lack of trust in their ejection seats, the brand-new condition of the Chinese F-7Bs was perceived to significantly reduce the risk of MiG-21 operations.

One F-7B was lost after an engine failure in 1987, with the pilot ejecting safely.

=== Personnel ===
The initial cadre of the 4477th, both pilots and maintainers, were drawn from Air Force personnel previously supporting Have Idea.

Unlike the Air Force Systems Command test pilots tasked with evaluating new aircraft types under the Have projects, the pilots of the 4477th did not have to climb into unfamiliar aircraft and establish a flight envelope. Instead, the pilots of Constant Peg were required to be outstanding fighter pilots and instructors who had mastered the principles of air combat maneuvring, and who were able to maintain enough situational awareness while flying the MiGs to their limits that they could provide training and commentary to students in another aircraft while doing so. A level of risk tolerance was also required, noting that the MiGs were being operated with no manufacturer support.

To meet these requirements, additional Air Force pilots were initially hired from among the Aggressor squadrons, and the first Navy pilots to join the 4477th were given the unclassified cover assignment of an exchange tour with the Aggressors. In later years, and particularly as the Aggressors developed a poor reputation for safety, pilots were instead recruited from the USAF and USN Fighter Weapons Schools. Initial conversion to the MiGs typically required around five sorties, although this represented the most basic conversion and only qualified each pilot to perform visual exposures. Qualification for air combat maneuvring in the MiGs took several months, and included sorties flown one-on-one with another squadron pilot in a T-38. Each pilot began their time in the squadron in the MiG-21, which was considered easier to fly, and transitioned to the MiG-23 towards the end of their tour.

A total of 69 pilots flew with the 4477th during Constant Peg, each being assigned a callsign in series from "Bandit 1" to "Bandit 69". The majority of pilots selected were Captains and Majors.

The first maintainers to join the 4477th had been responsible for the reconstruction and maintenance of the MiG-17 and MiG-21 aircraft used in the earlier Have projects, and knew the aircraft well. Maintenance during Have Idea had been a trial and error exercise, with spare parts often having been taken from crashed aircraft or scrapyards, or reproduced locally. No English language manuals were available, although written maintenance procedures were gradually developed as Constant Peg progressed.

The maintainers were the key to allowing the 4477th to continue to operate despite these challenges. Additional ground crew were recruited from across the USAF, with essential qualities including creativity and flexibility. Many maintainers had previously worked on USAF test projects at Edwards AFB, or on other low volume special projects such as the SR-71. Considering the requirement for experience and improvisation over adherence to written manuals, maintainers were hired for a minimum of a six-year tour that could be extended if required.

In contrast to USAF procedure it was standard practice for both Red Hat and Red Eagle pilots to not perform a pre-flight walkaround inspection, crediting the maintainers with full responsibility for delivery of an airworthy aircraft for each sortie. Conducting pre-flight checks on a MiG-21 could take the maintainers 30 minutes, while the same checks on the more complex MiG-23 could take as long as 90 minutes.

At times, both pilots and maintainers for the Red Eagles were seconded to the Red Hats to support evaluations of newly available Soviet aircraft, variants, or systems. While these transfers blurred the lines between the responsibilities of the TAC and AFSC organisations, they could bring valuable insights to the training being delivered to front line pilots.

=== Operations ===
The mission of the 4477th TES under Constant Peg was to provide as many exposures of front line aircrew to actual adversary aircraft as possible, in order to maximise the effectiveness of the US tactical air forces in future conflicts. Aircrew were exposed to the MiGs during Red Flag exercises (either as individual exposures or against the Red Eagles acting as an Aggressor squadron), as part of the USAF Fighter Weapons School or USN TOPGUN courses, or later through squadron-scale exposure deployments.

While some early exposures were arranged in such a way that a pilot's first sight of a 4477th MiG was during an established air combat maneuvring exercise, these first exposures showed that "buck fever" would affect a pilot's performance over the Nevada desert just as strongly as in the skies over Vietnam, and limited training value would result from the first flight. A system was developed by which pilots would be progressively introduced to the appearance and then the capabilities of the MiGs.

Each exposure began at a 4477th TES secure facility at Nellis AFB, during which students would be read-in to the Constant Peg program and briefed on the training they would receive.

The first phase of the exposure would be a controlled mid-air rendezvous during which the student would first join formation with a MiG in flight. During this phase the student would become familiar with the appearance of the subject aircraft from a range of angles while varying formation position, while the Red Eagle instructor pilot would point out the areas of poor visibility for the MiG pilot.

This would be followed by the second phase of the exposure, termed the "performance profile", during which the Red Eagle instructor showed the student the capabilities of the subject aircraft. These profiles began with a demonstration of the aircraft's acceleration at maximum afterburner in straight and level flight, and progressed to the student attempting to fly formation on the subject aircraft at its maximum sustained turn rate.

Only after completion of these initial familiarisation phases did each exposure progress to mock combat. By this time the student would have overcome the shock of encountering an enemy aircraft, had directly experienced the strengths of that aircraft, and was prepared to counter them with their own aircraft and training.

This phased exposure often took place over multiple flights, depending on available time and fuel. The training each student received was carefully recorded, so that if an exposure had to end early, or if a student was able to return for a second exposure, training could resume where it had left off.

Pilots of the 4477th initially flew twice a day, and returned to Nellis to debrief their students in person at the end of each day. Over time the operational tempo of the squadron increased as more aircraft and pilots became available, the logistics of in-person debriefings grew more challenging, and debriefings were held over telephone instead.

The 4477th practiced realistic adversary tactics when taking part in engagements beyond visual range, but maneuvred their aircraft to the limits of their capabilities within visual range. This approach prepared aircrew for the most challenging encounter they could expect to face in combat.

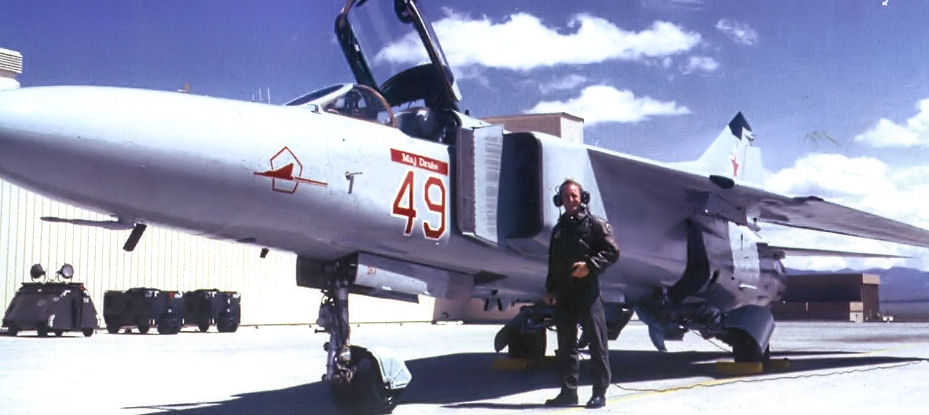
"Red 49" MiG-23 on the Tonopah ramp, 1988

The practical problem of referring to classified aircraft types in mission logs and paperwork was solved by assigning the MiGs dummy numbers in the Century Series. The MiG-21s and F-7Bs were referred to as the "YF-110" (the original designation for the USAF F-4C), while the MiG-23s were referred to as the "YF-113".

The 4477th operated three types of MiG for more than a decade, from 1977 to 1988. While the aircraft were never flown in bad weather or at night, the 4477th flew a total of 15,264 sorties in support of Constant Peg, exposing nearly 6,000 aircrew.

The end of Cold War and the high costs of keeping the MiGs flying resulted in Constant Peg being terminated in March 1988. The squadron's final sorties, taking place after the announcement that the program was to end, were flown on 4 March 1988, and included the simultaneous launch of 13 MiG-21s and 4 MiG-23s to support Red Flag.

=== 4477th inventory ===
- 1979 inventory: 1 x MiG-17F, 1 x Lim-5P (MiG-17PF), 6 x MiG-21F-13.
- 1980: 1 x MiG-17F, 1 x Lim-5P (MiG-17PF), 6 x MiG-21F-13.
- 1981: 2 x MiG-17F, 1 x Lim-5P, 6 x MiG-21F-13, 1 MiG-23BN.
- 1982: 8 x MiG-21F-13/F-7B, 1 x MiG-23BN, 2 x MiG-23MS.
- 1983: 9 x MiG-21F-13F-7B, 2 x MiG-23BN, 4 x MiG-23MS.
- 1984: 15 x MiG-21F-13/F-7B, 4 x MiG-23BN/MS.
- 1985: 17 x MiG-21F-13/F-7B, 10 x MiG-23BN/MS.
- 1986: 14 x MiG-21F-13/F-7B, 10 x MiG-23BN/MS.
- 1987: all MiGs-21F-13 retired and replaced by Chengdu F-7B. 14 x MiG-21 (F-7B), 10 x MiG-23BN/MS.
- 1988 inventory: 14 x MiG-21 (F-7B), 9 x MiG-23BN/MS.

=== 4477th TEF/TES Accidents ===
On 23 August 1979, USN Lieutenant M. Hugh "Bandit" Brown was killed in a MiG-17F crash. Brown had been engaged in air combat maneuvring with a US Navy F-5 when his aircraft departed controlled flight and entered a spin. Brown attempted to recover from the spin, but was not able to regain control of the aircraft within the height available. He did not attempt to eject, and was killed on impact.

On 8 April 1982, a MiG-17 was destroyed when its engine failed immediately after takeoff. The pilot, USAF Captain Mark "Toast" Postai, made a successful landing on the desert beyond the end of the runway, but the aircraft sustained damage during the landing roll and caught fire.

On 21 October 1982, USAF Captain Mark "Toast" Postai was killed in a MiG-23 crash. Postai was attempting a deadstick landing after an engine fire, but the aircraft stalled just short of the runway and crashed. Postai attempted to eject, but due to the unusual attitude of the aircraft at point of ejection the seat impacted the separated canopy and he was killed. Postai had previously ejected from an F-4, and had survived a MiG-17 accident only months before.

On 25 June 1987, a MiG-21 was destroyed following an engine failure. The pilot, USAF Major Rick "Caz" Cazessus, ejected safely.

On 28 August 1987, a MiG-23BN was destroyed following a spin. The pilot, USAF Major Herbert "Hawk" Carlisle, ejected safely.

=== End of operations ===
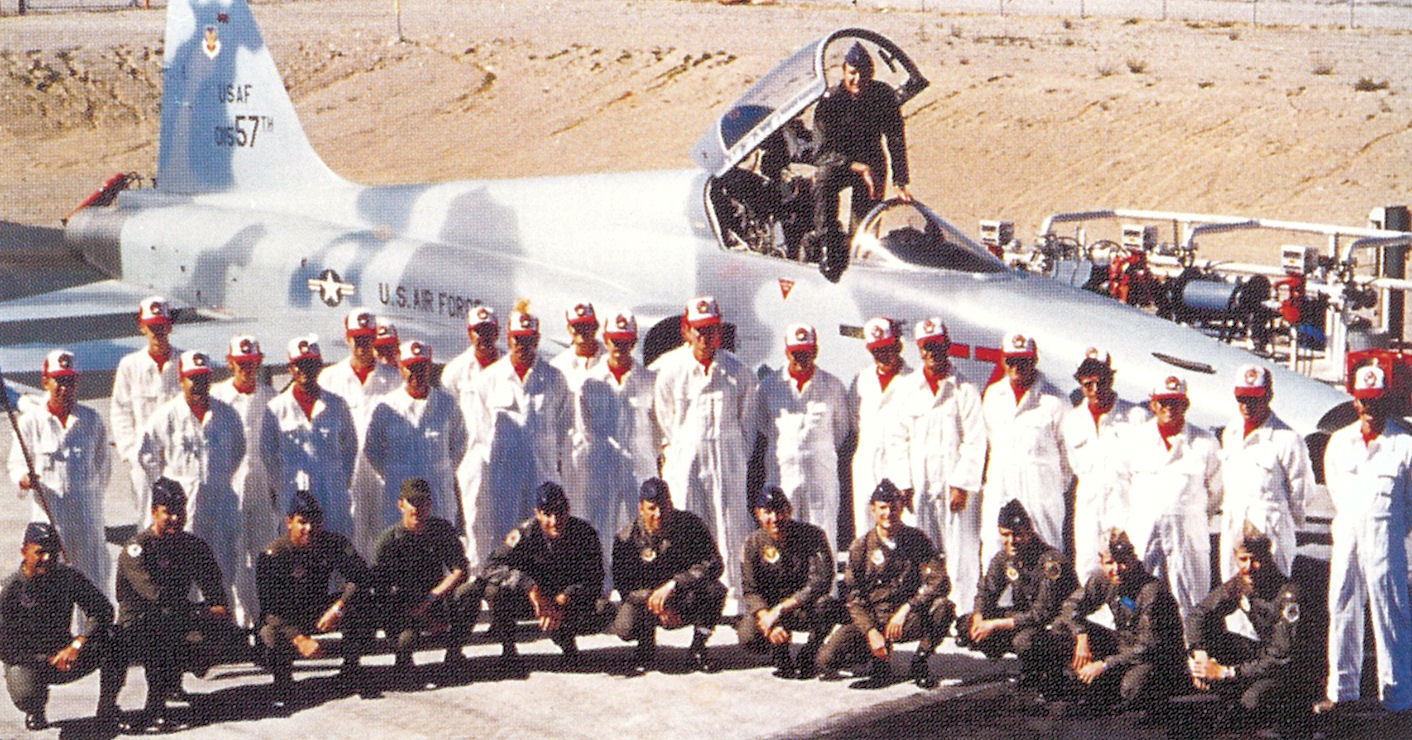
Squadron members with one of the F-5E Trainers/DACT aircraft

Near the end of the Cold War the program was ostensibly abandoned and the squadron was disbanded. The Air Force was experiencing a drawdown as the Cold War was ending, with the reduction in funding also affecting the Aggressor squadrons.

Constant Peg flight operations at Tonopah closed down in March 1988, although the 4477th was not inactivated until July 1990, according to one official Air Force history. In the interim, a handful of former Red Eagle pilots flew 'continuation training' sorties in the MiG-23 at Groom Lake, and it has been reported that an additional six pilots were added to the list of Red Eagle "Bandit" callsigns following termination of the program.

The assets of the Squadron could not go to the boneyard at Davis–Monthan AFB, and the fate of some of them remain classified. Several of the Indonesian MiG-21F-13s and MiG-23s can now be seen at museums or on static display, but none of the F-7Bs used during Constant Peg have emerged from Tonopah. Several of the F-7Bs are reported to have been used for target practice or buried in the desert, most likely to maintain the secrecy of their Chinese origins.

=== Ongoing foreign technology evaluation ===
After the 4477 TES was inactivated, the remaining assets were reconstituted as a detachment of the 57th Fighter Wing at Nellis AFB, now known as Detachment 3, 53rd Test and Evaluation Group.

Anecdotal evidence suggests that exploitation of foreign aircraft today has returned to the original hierarchy seen in the 1960s and 1970s when HAVE IDEA became the umbrella program for exploiting foreign tactical fighters: the 'assets' are exploited first for performance, materials and qualities by Air Force Materiel Command (the successor to AFSC), before Air Force Combat Command (the successor to TAC) is then given access to the aircraft for tactical exploitation.

There have been multiple sightings of foreign aircraft over Nevada since the end of Constant Peg and the inactivation of the 4477th TES.

In 1993 the Red Hats conducted an exploitation of former East German Su-22s which were sent to the United States. With East and West Germany now unified, there was an ample supply of both Soviet-built planes and the spare parts needed to support them.

In a March 1994 article on Groom Lake in Popular Science, a photo was published of an Su-22 fighter in flight. The plane was painted in a green and tan finish. The Su-22 is a swing-wing, light-attack aircraft. It was in frontline Russian Air Force service at the time, and was exported widely to Eastern European and Third World countries during the 1970s and 1980s. A Red Hats Su-22 is reported to have been lost in 1998, with the pilot ejecting safely.

In October 1994, Aerospace Daily reported that "reliable observers" had sighted an Su-27 Flanker on two occasions. The Su-27 is a Russian first-line advanced interceptor in operation with both the Russia and People's Republic of China air forces.

In 1997 the US government purchased twenty-one MiG-29s from Moldova under the Cooperative Threat Reduction programme. While the end destination for these aircraft remains unknown, it has been reported that the USAF has produced English language flight manuals for both the MiG-29 and the Su-27.

In 2003 the USAF conducted an unclassified training exercise with former East German MiG-29s operated by the German Air Force at Eglin Air Force Base in Florida. Seven German MiG-29s took part, with the extensive exploitation programme including approximately three hundred sorties.

In 2009 a MiG-29 was photographed flying over Groom Lake, and Su-27s have been photographed flying over Groom Lake between 2003 and 2019. In September 2017 Lt. Col Eric "Doc" Schultz, then commander of the Red Hats, died following ejection from an two-seat Su-27UB operating from Groom Lake that had experienced an undercarriage malfunction and became unsafe to land.

Today, it is believed that Air Combat Command (ACC) shares access to Mikoyan MiG-29s and Su-27 aircraft somewhere in Nevada (most likely Groom Lake) flying against Fighter Weapons School instructors, 422d Test and Evaluation Squadron aircrews and F-15 Eagle and F-16 Fighting Falcon "Aggressor" aircraft flying from Nellis AFB.

=== Lineage ===
- Established by Tactical Air Command as 4477th Test and Evaluation Flight and activated, 1 April 1977

Status changed to Squadron and re-designated: 4477th Test and Evaluation Squadron, 1 May 1980
Inactivated on 15 July 1990

=== Assignments ===
- 57th Tactical Training Wing, 1 April 1977

Re-designated: 57th Fighter Weapons Wing, 1 March 1980 – 15 July 1990

=== Stations ===
- Nellis Air Force Base, Nevada, 1 April 1977 – 15 July 1990

Operationally located at: Tonopah Test Range Airport, Nevada, entire period

=== Aircraft ===
As an operations security measure, the Soviet aircraft had their own US aircraft designations in order to avoid using the actual Soviet designations.

- YF-110B Soviet MiG-21F-13
- YF-110C Chinese Chengdu F-7B/J-7B (MiG-21F-13 variant)
- YF-110D Soviet MiG-21MF
- YF-113B Soviet MiG-23BN
- YF-113E Soviet MiG-23MS NATO:"Flogger-E"
- YF-114C Soviet MiG-17F
- YF-114D Soviet MiG-17PF
- Northrop T-38/F-5E/F Tiger II Used as a chase/DACT training planes
