= Gail Peck =

United States Air Force officer and pilot

Gaillard R. Peck Jr.
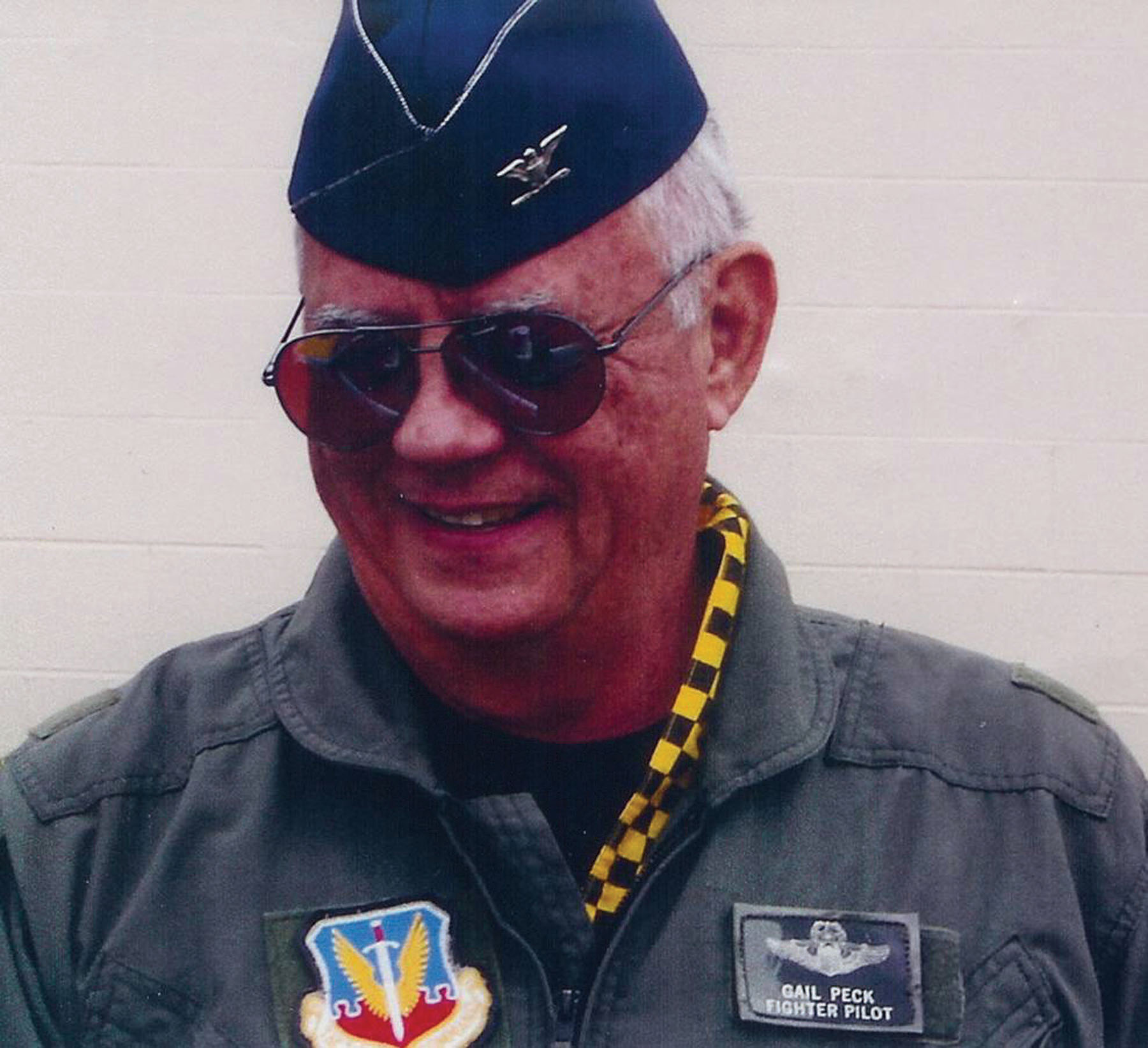
- Born: October 31, 1940
- Died: October 10, 2024 (aged 83)
- Military career
- Allegiance: United States
- Branch: United States Air Force
- Rank: Colonel
- Awards: Silver Star; Legion of Merit (2 awards); Distinguished Flying Cross (3 awards); Defense Meritorious Service Medal; Meritorious Service Medal; Air Medal (several)

Colonel (Ret.) Gaillard (Gail) R. Peck Jr. (October 31, 1940 – October 31, 2024) was a career officer in the United States Air Force. He is best known as creator of the Constant Peg training program that trained United States airmen against a collection of MiG fighter jets.

== Decorations ==
- Silver Star
- Legion of Merit (2 awards)
- Distinguished Flying Cross (3 awards)
- Defense Meritorious Service Medal
- Meritorious Service Medal
- Air Medal (several)
