= Mikoyan-Gurevich MiG-17 =

Soviet jet fighter aircraft family

MiG-17
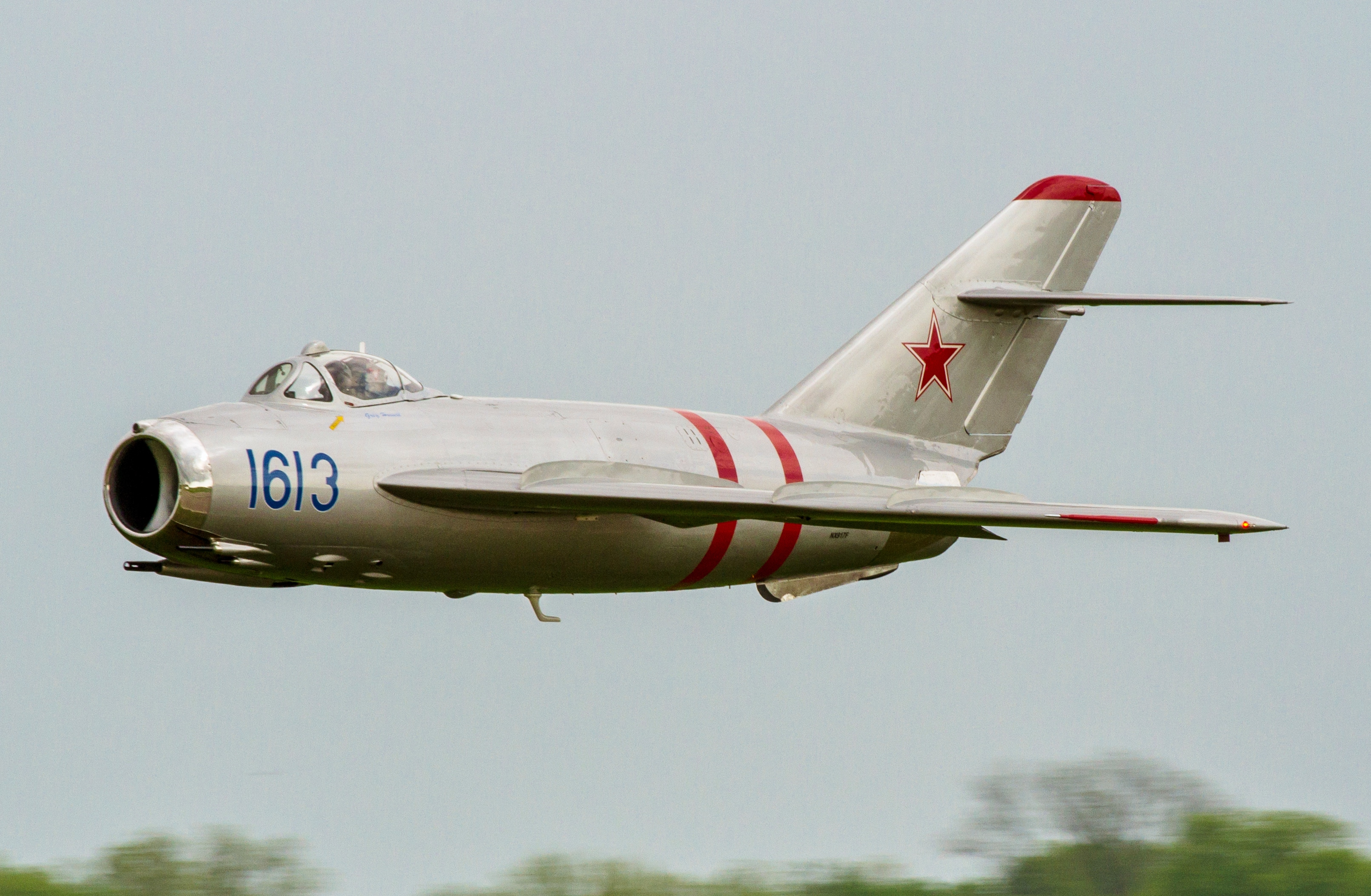
- PZL-Mielec Lim-5, Polish variant of the MiG-17

General information
- Type: Fighter aircraft
- National origin: Soviet Union
- Manufacturer: Mikoyan-Gurevich
- Status: In limited service
- Primary users: Soviet Air Forces (historical) People's Liberation Army Air Force (historical); Polish Air Force (historical); Vietnam People's Air Force (historical)
- Number built: 10,649 including Polish, Czechoslovak and Chinese variants

History
- Introduction date: October 1952
- First flight: 14 January 1950
- Developed from: Mikoyan-Gurevich MiG-15
- Variants: PZL-Mielec Lim-6; Shenyang J-5
- Developed into: Mikoyan-Gurevich MiG-19

The Mikoyan-Gurevich MiG-17 (Russian: Микоян и Гуревич МиГ-17; NATO reporting name: Fresco) is a transonic fighter aircraft that was produced in the Soviet Union from 1952 and was operated by air forces internationally. The MiG-17 was license-built in China as the Shenyang J-5 and in Poland as the PZL-Mielec Lim-6. The MiG-17 is still being used by North Korea's air force in the present day and has seen combat in the Middle East and Asia.

The MiG-17 was an advanced modification of the MiG-15 aircraft that was produced by the Soviet Union during the Korean War. Production of the MiG-17 was too late for use in that conflict and was first used in the Second Taiwan Strait Crisis in 1958. While the MiG-17 was designed to shoot down slower American bombers, it showed surprising success when used by North Vietnamese pilots to combat American fighters and fighter-bombers during the Vietnam War, nearly a decade after its initial design. This was due to the MiG-17 being more agile and maneuverable than the American F-4 Phantom and F-105 Thunderchief, which were focused on speed and long range combat, as well as the MiG-17 being armed with guns, which initial models of the F-4 Phantom lacked.

== Design and development ==
While the MiG-15bis introduced swept wings to air combat over Korea, the Mikoyan-Gurevich design bureau had already begun work on its replacement in 1949 (originally the MiG-15bis45) in order to fix any problems found with the MiG-15 in combat. The result was one of the most successful transonic fighters introduced before the advent of true supersonic types such as the Mikoyan-Gurevich MiG-19 and North American F-100 Super Sabre. The design ultimately proved effective into the 1960s when pressed into subsonic dogfights over Vietnam against much faster planes that were not optimized for maneuvering in such lower speed, short-range engagements.

While the MiG-15 used a Mach sensor to deploy airbrakes because it could not safely exceed Mach 0.92, the MiG-17 was designed to be controllable at higher Mach numbers. Early versions that retained the original Soviet copy of the Rolls-Royce Nene engine, the Klimov VK-1, were heavier with equal thrust. Later MiG-17s were the first Soviet fighter application of an afterburner, which burned extra fuel in the exhaust of the basic engine to give extra thrust at a high efficiency cost.

Though the MiG-17 looks very similar to the MiG-15, it had a new thinner and more highly swept wing and tailplane for speeds approaching Mach 1. While the F-86 introduced the "all-flying" tailplane, which made the aircraft more controllable near the speed of sound, this feature was not adopted on MiG aircraft until the fully supersonic MiG-19. The wing sweep was 45° (like the U.S. F-100 Super Sabre) near the fuselage and 42° for the outboard part of the wing. The stiffer wing resisted the tendency to bend its wingtips and lose aerodynamic symmetry unexpectedly at high speeds and wing loads.

Other easily visible differences to its predecessor were the addition of a third wing fence on each wing, the addition of a ventral fin and a longer and less tapered rear fuselage that added about one meter in length. The MiG-17 shared the same Klimov VK-1 engine, and much of the rest of its construction such as the forward fuselage, landing gear and gun installation was carried over. The first prototype, designated I-330 "SI" by the construction bureau, was flown on 14 January 1950, piloted by Ivan Ivashchenko.

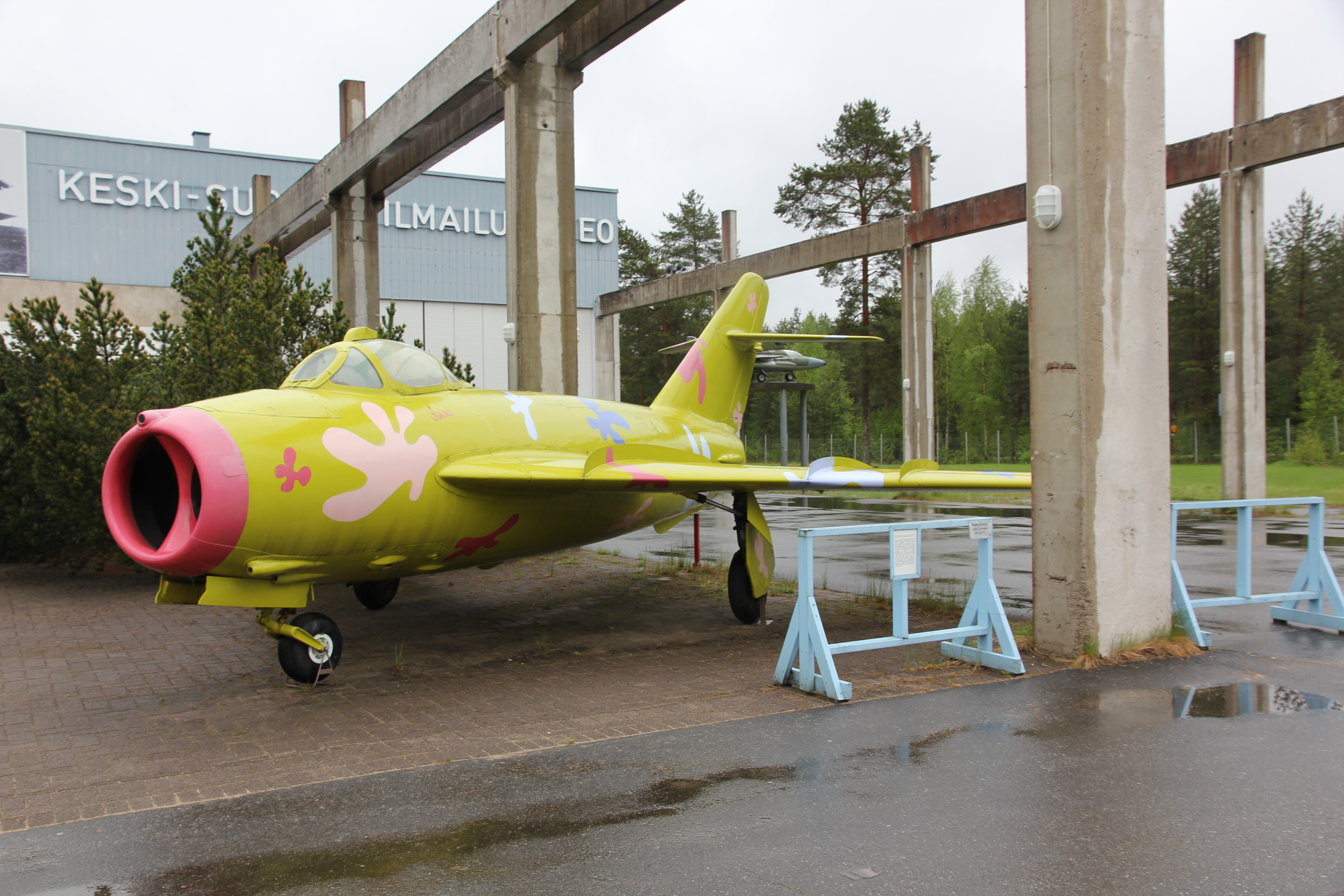
MiG-17 at the Aviation Museum of Central Finland in Jyväskylä. The paintscheme is from 2006 and is based on the idea of Luonetjärvi primary school student Anni Lundahl.

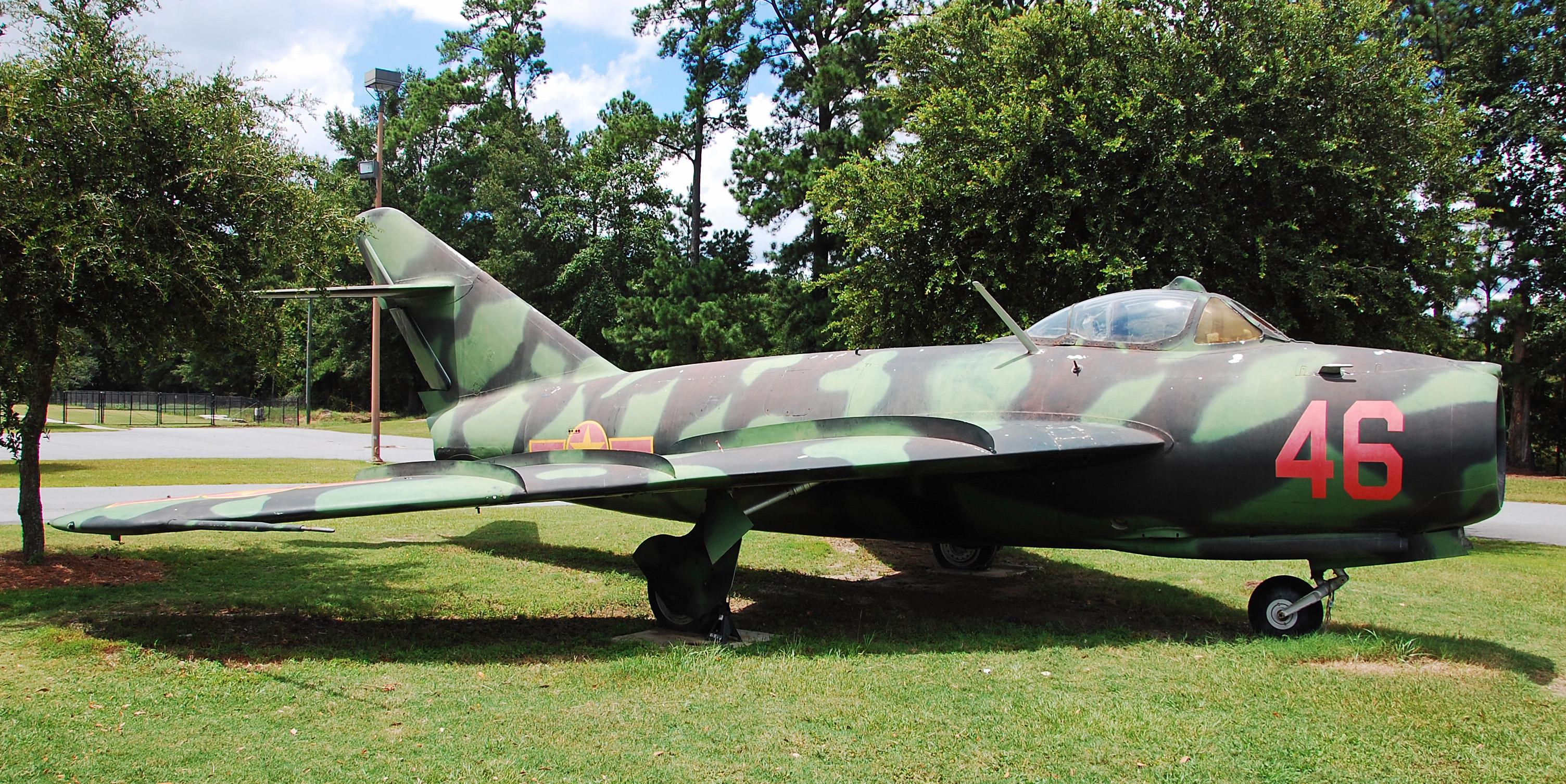
A North Vietnamese MiG-17 on display at the Mighty Eighth Air Force Museum.

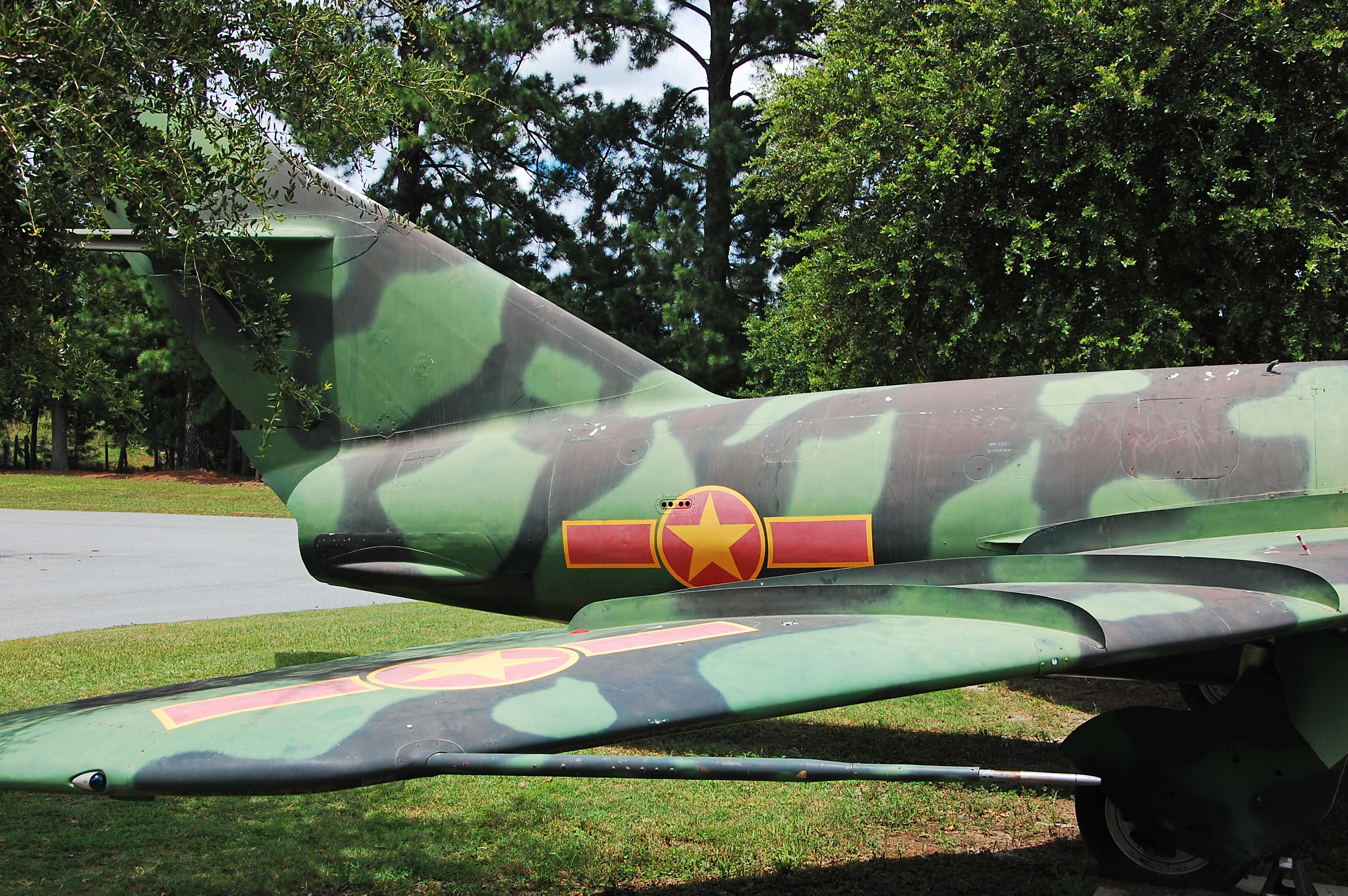
Tail section showing insignia; camouflaged MiG-17s were often referred to as "snakes" by VPAF pilots.

In the midst of testing, pilot Ivan Ivashchenko was killed when his aircraft developed flutter, which tore off his horizontal tail, causing a spin and crash on 17 March 1950. Lack of wing stiffness also resulted in aileron reversal which was discovered and fixed. Construction and tests of additional prototypes "SI-2" and experimental series aircraft "SI-02" and "SI-01" in 1951, were generally successful. On 1 September 1951, the aircraft was accepted for production, and formally given its own MiG-17 designation after so many changes from the original MiG-15. It was estimated that with the same engine as the MiG-15's, the MiG-17's maximum speed is higher by 40–50 km/h, and the fighter has greater maneuverability at high altitude.

Serial production started in August 1951, but large quantity production was delayed in favor of producing more MiG-15s so it was never introduced in the Korean War. It did not enter service until October 1952, when the MiG-19 was almost ready to be flight tested. During production, the aircraft was improved and modified several times. The basic MiG-17 was a general-purpose day fighter, armed with three cannons, one Nudelman N-37 37 mm cannon and two 23 mm with 80 rounds per gun, 160 rounds total. It could also act as a fighter-bomber, but its bombload was considered light relative to other aircraft of the time, and it usually carried additional fuel tanks instead of bombs.

Although a canopy that provided clear vision to the rear—necessary for air-to-air combat (dogfighting), like the F-86—was designed, production MiG-17Fs got a cheaper rear-view periscope, which still appeared on Soviet fighters as late as the MiG-23. By 1953, pilots got safer ejection seats with protective face curtains and leg restraints like the Martin-Baker seats in the West. The MiG-15 had suffered from lack of a radar gunsight, but in 1951, Soviet engineers obtained a captured F-86 Sabre from Korea, and copied the optical gunsight and SRD-3 gun ranging radar to produce the ASP-4N gunsight and SRC-3 radar. The combination proved deadly over the skies of Vietnam against aircraft such as the F-4 Phantom, whose pilots lamented that guns and radar gunsights had been omitted as obsolescent.

The second prototype variant, "SP-2" (dubbed "Fresco A" by NATO), was an interceptor equipped with a radar. Soon a number of MiG-17P ("Fresco B") all-weather fighters were produced with the RP-1 Izumrud radar and front air intake modifications.

In early 1953 the MiG-17F day fighter entered production. The "F" indicated it was fitted with the VK-1F engine with an afterburner by modifying the rear fuselage with a new convergent-divergent nozzle and fuel system. Early VK-1F engines that were specifically modified to equip the MIG-17F had issues during prolonged normal afterburner usage, due to the insufficient heat resistance of the alloys used for the external nozzle body and stator vanes. Because of this, early 1953-1955 production planes had a special afterburner unit that used a separate tank filled with 90% ethanol for consumption in the afterburner due to its lower combustion temperature. This engine variant was labeled VK-1F(A). Later production jets used a normal system with on-board fuel. The afterburner doubled the rate of climb and greatly improved vertical maneuvers. But while the plane was not designed to be supersonic, skilled pilots could just dash to supersonic speed in a shallow dive, although the aircraft would often pitch up just short of Mach 1. This became the most popular variant of the MiG-17. The next mass-produced variant, MiG-17PF ("Fresco D") incorporated a more powerful Izumrud RP-2 radar, though they were still dependent on Ground Control Interception to find and be directed to targets. In 1956 a small series (47 aircraft) was converted to the MiG-17PM standard (also known as PFU) with four first-generation Kaliningrad K-5 (NATO reporting name AA-1 'Alkali') air-to-air missiles. A small series of MiG-17R reconnaissance aircraft were built with VK-1F engine (after first being tested with the VK-5F engine).

5,467 MiG-17, 1,685 MiG-17F, 225 MiG-17P and 668 MiG-17PF were built in the USSR by 1958. Over 2,600 were built under licence in Poland and China.

=== License production ===
MiG-17F on display at the Hiller Aviation Museum in San Carlos, California

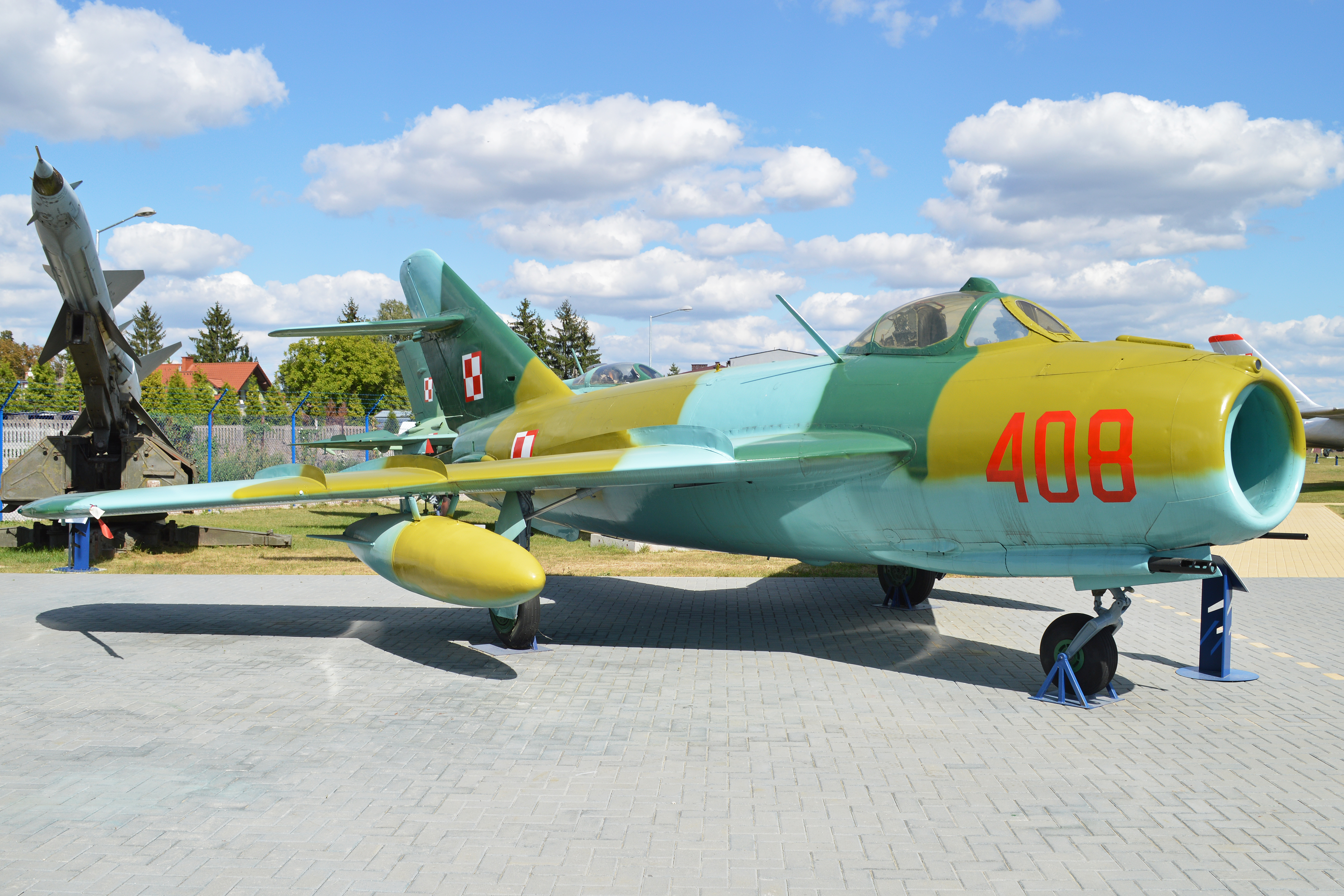
Lim-5 in Polish Air Force markings

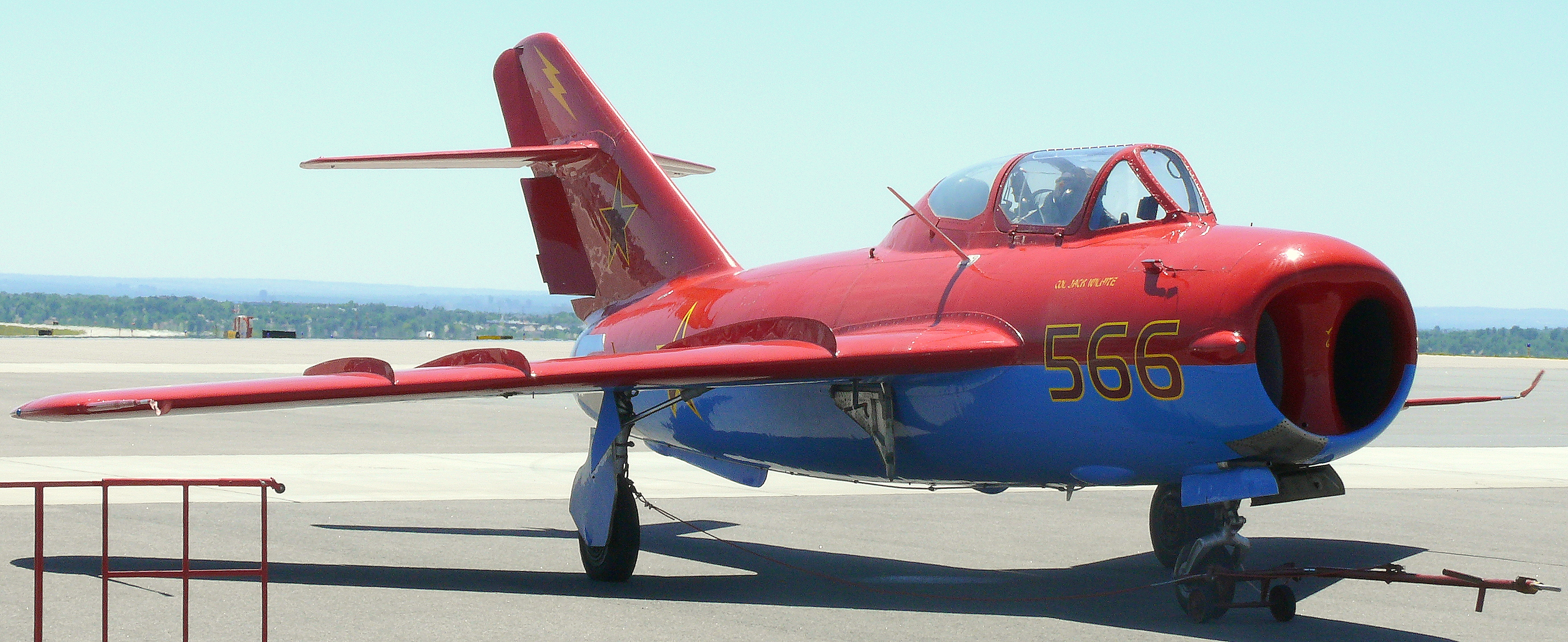
A privately owned JJ-5 (MiG-17) at JeffCo Airport

In 1955, Poland received a license for MiG-17 production. The MiG-17F was produced by the WSK-Mielec factory under the designation Lim-5 (an abbreviation of licencyjny myśliwiec – license-built fighter). The first Lim-5 was built on 28 November 1956 and 477 were built by 1960. Apart from Poland, a number were exported to Bulgaria, designated as MiG-17F. An unknown number were built as the Lim-5R reconnaissance variant, fitted with the AFA-39 camera. In 1959–1960, 129 MiG-17PF interceptors were produced as the Lim-5P. WSK-Mielec also developed several Polish strike variants based on the MiG-17: the Lim-5M, produced from 1960; Lim-6bis, produced from 1963 (totaling 170 aircraft). Additionally some Lim-5Ps were converted in the 1970s into attack Lim-6Ms whereas other Lim-5, Lim-6bis and Lim-5P aircraft were modified for reconnaissance role as the Lim-6R, Lim-6bis R and Lim-6MR.

In the People's Republic of China (PRC), an initial MiG-17F was assembled from parts in 1956, with license production following in 1957 at Shenyang. The Chinese-built version is known as the Shenyang J-5 (for local use) or F-5 (for export). Similarly the MiG-17PF was manufactured there as the J-5A (F-5A for export). Altogether 767 of these single-seater variants were built.

== Operational history ==
MiG-17s were designed to intercept straight-and-level-flying enemy bombers, not for dogfighting with other fighters. This subsonic (Mach .93) fighter was effective against slower (Mach .6-.8), heavily loaded U.S. fighter-bombers, as well as the mainstay American strategic bombers during the MiG-17's development cycle (such as the Boeing B-50 Superfortress or Convair B-36 Peacemaker, which were both still powered by piston engines). It was not however able to intercept the new generation of British jet bombers such as the Avro Vulcan and Handley Page Victor, which could both fly higher. The USAF's introduction of strategic bombers capable of supersonic dash speeds such as the Convair B-58 Hustler and General Dynamics FB-111 rendered the MiG-17 obsolete in front-line PVO service, and they were supplanted by supersonic interceptors such as the MiG-21 and MiG-23.

MiG-17s were not available for the Korean War, but saw combat for the first time over the Straits of Taiwan when the Communist PRC MiG-17s clashed with the Republic of China (ROC, Nationalist China) F-86 Sabres in 1958. Twenty countries flew MiG-17s and it became a standard fighter in all Warsaw Pact countries in the late 1950s and early 1960s. They were also bought by many other countries, mainly in Africa and Asia, that were neutrally aligned or allied with the USSR. The MiG-17 still flies today in the air forces of Democratic Republic of the Congo, Guinea, Mali, Madagascar, Sudan, and Tanzania, and by extension through the Shenyang J-5, North Korea. JJ-5s trainers are still in limited use in China as well.

=== Vietnam ===
==== Vietnam War ====
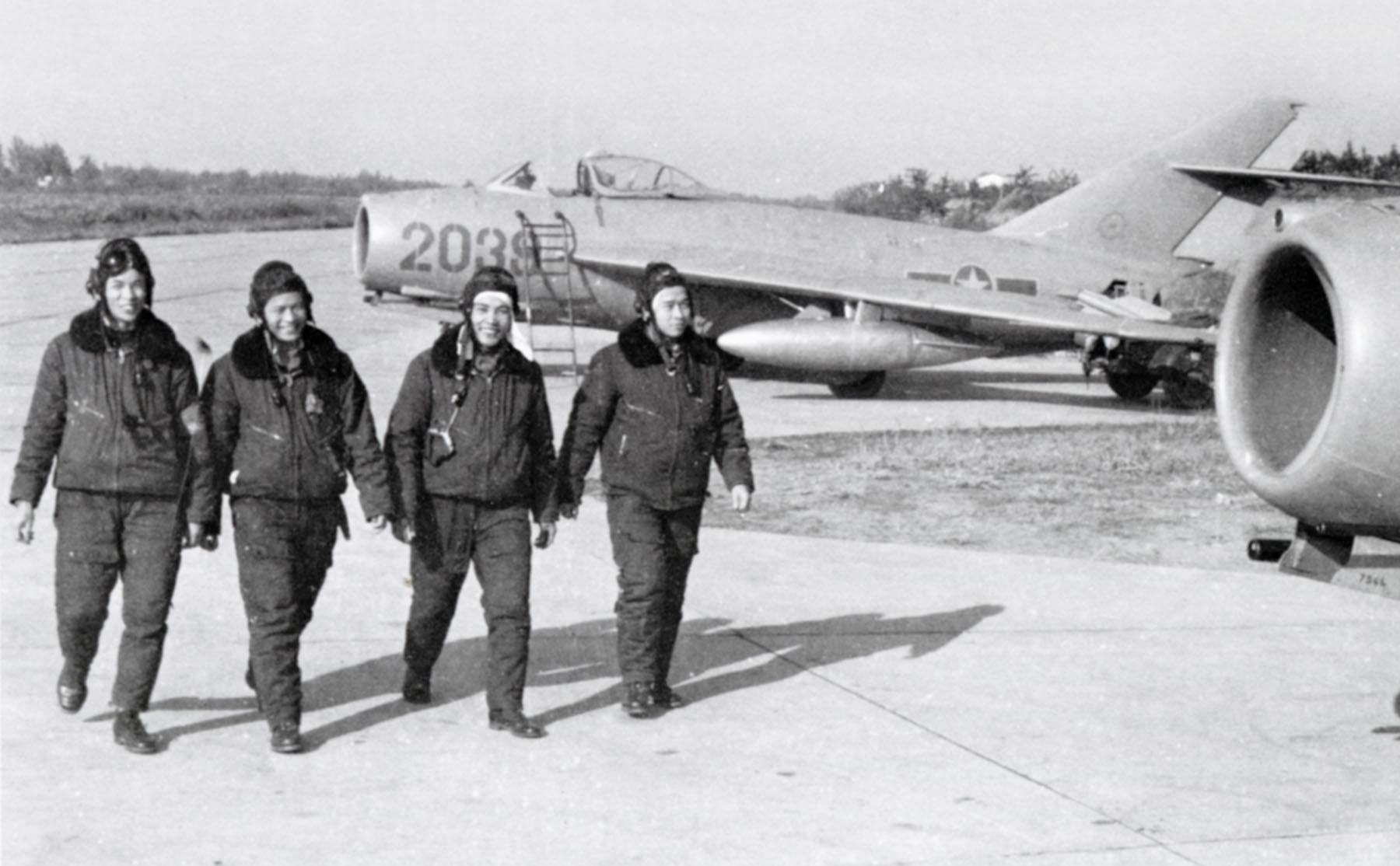
VPAF pilots with MiG-17s

In 1960, the first group of approximately 50 North Vietnamese airmen were transferred to the PRC to begin transitional training onto the MiG-17. By this time the first detachment of Chinese trained MiG-15 pilots had returned to North Vietnam, and a group of 31 airmen were deployed to the Vietnam People's Air Force (VPAF) base at Son Dong for conversion to the MiG-17. By 1962 the first North Vietnamese pilots had finished their MiG-17 courses in the Soviet Union and the PRC, and returned to their units; to mark the occasion, the Soviets sent as a "gift" 36 MiG-17 fighters and MiG-15UTI trainers to Hanoi in February 1964. These airmen would create North Vietnam's first jet fighter regiment, the 921st. By 1965, another group of MiG pilots had returned from training in Krasnodar, in the USSR, as well as from the PRC. This group would form North Vietnam's second fighter unit, the 923rd Fighter Regiment. While the newly created 923rd FR operated only MiG-17s, and initially these were the only types available to oppose modern American supersonic jets before MiG-21s and MiG-19s were introduced into North Vietnamese service (the 925 FR regiment was formed in 1969, flying MiG-19s).

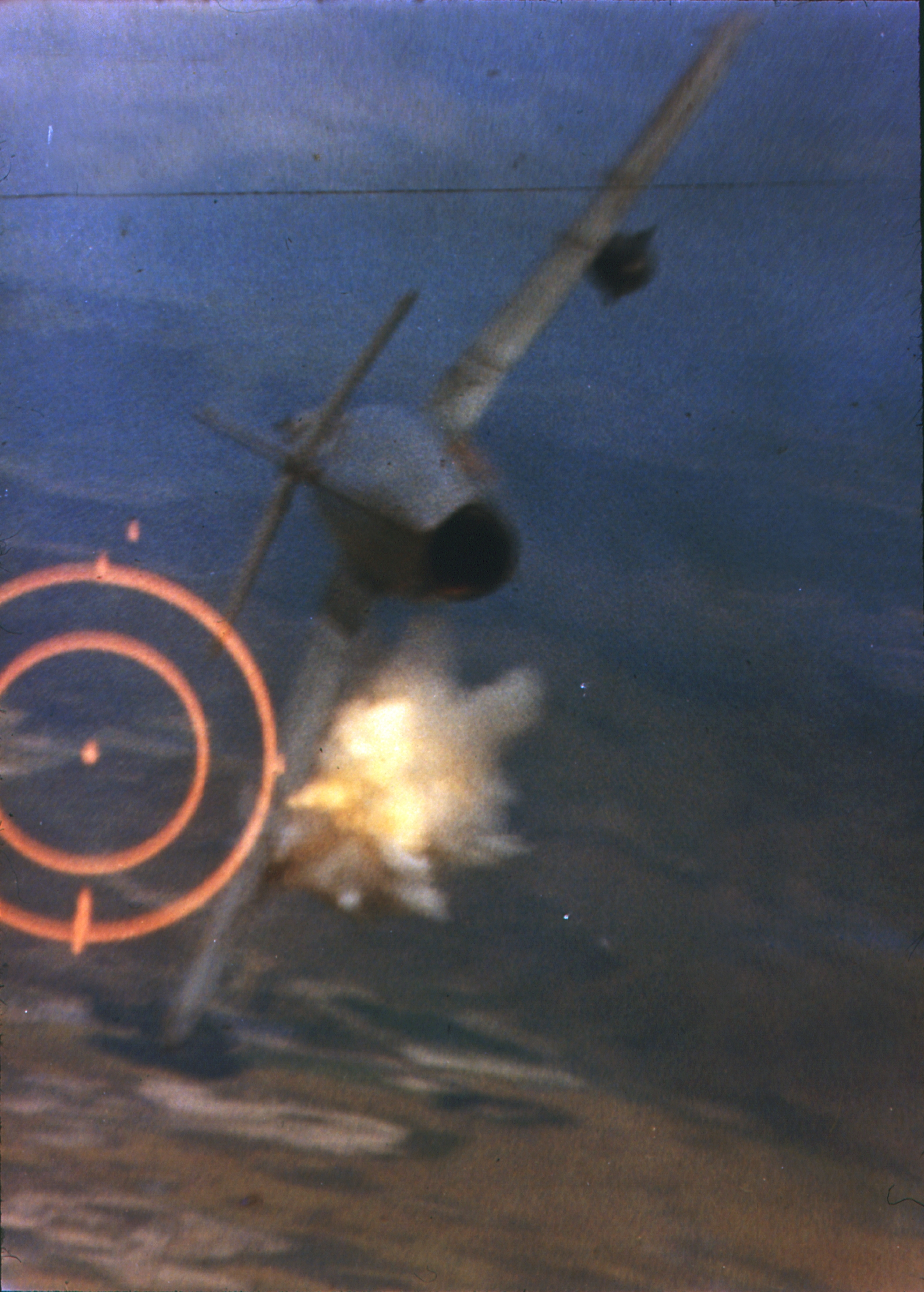
An F-105D shoots down a MiG-17 during the Vietnam War, 1967.

American fighter-bombers had been in theatre flying combat sorties since 1961, and the U.S. had many experienced pilots from the Korean War and World War II, such as World War II veteran Robin Olds. Untried MiGs and pilots of the VPAF would be pitted against some of the most combat experienced airmen of the U.S. Air Force (USAF) and U.S. Navy. On 3 April 1965 six MiGs took off from Noi Bai Air Base in two groups of two and four respectively, with the first acting as bait and the second being the shooters. Their target were U.S. Navy aircraft supporting an USAF 80-aircraft strike package trying to knock out the Thanh Hóa Bridge. The MiG-17 leader, Lt. Pham Ngoc Lan, attacked a group of Vought F-8 Crusaders of VF-211 from USS Hancock and damaged an F-8E flown by Lt. Cdr. Spence Thomas, who managed to land the aircraft at Da Nang Air Base. A second F-8 was claimed by his wingman Phan Van Tuc, but this is not corroborated by USN loss listings.

On 4 April 1965, the USAF made another attempt on the Thanh Hóa Bridge with 48 Republic F-105 Thunderchiefs of the 355th Tactical Fighter Wing (TFW) loaded with 384 x 750 lb (340 kg) bombs. The Thunderchiefs were escorted by a MIGCAP flight of F-100 Super Sabres from the 416th Tactical Fighter Squadron (416th TFS). Coming from above, four MiG-17s from the 921st Fighter Regiment bypassed the escorts and dove onto the Thunderchiefs, shooting two of them down; the leader Tran Hanh downed F‑105D BuNo. 59-1754 of Major F. E. Benett, and his element leader Le Minh Huan downed F-105D BuNo. 59-1764 of Captain J. A. Magnusson. The Super Sabres engaged; one AIM-9 Sidewinder was fired and missed (or malfunctioned), and another F-100D flown by Captain Donald Kilgus fired 20 mm cannons, scoring a probable kill. Tran Hanh's wingman Pham Giay went down and was killed. No other U.S. airmen reported any confirmed aerial kills during the air battle; Tran Hanh stated that three of his accompanying MiG-17s had been shot down by the opposing USAF fighters.

Three F-100s from the MiGCAP, piloted by LtCol Emmett L. Hays, Capt Keith B. Connolly, and Capt Donald W. Kilgus, all from the 416th TFS, had engaged the MiG-17s. The four attacking MiGs from the 921st FR were flown by Flight Leader Tran Hanh, Wingman Pham Giay, Le Minh Huan and Tran Nguyen Nam. Flight Leader Tran Hanh was the only Vietnamese survivor from the air battle and believed that the others in his flight were "... shot down by the F-105s." Based upon the report, the USAF F-100s could have been mistaken for F-105s, and the loss of three MiG-17s was attributed to Super Sabres, the first aerial victories of any American aircraft in the war. The F-100s themselves would never again encounter MiGs, being relegated to close air support. They were replaced in the MiGCAP role by faster and longer range but less manoeuvrable McDonnell Douglas F-4 Phantoms.

USAF Chief of Staff General John P. McConnell was "hopping mad" to hear that two Mach-2-class F-105s had been shot down by Korean War-era subsonic North Vietnamese MiG-17s.

In 1965, the NVAF had only 36 MiG-17s and a similar number of qualified pilots, which increased to 180 MiGs and 72 pilots by 1968. The Americans had at least 200 USAF F-4s and 140 USAF F-105s, plus at least 100 U.S. Navy aircraft (F-8s, A-4s and F-4s) which operated from the aircraft carriers in the Gulf of Tonkin, plus scores of other support aircraft. The Americans had a multiple numerical advantage.

The MiG-17 was the primary interceptor of the fledgling VPAF in 1965, responsible for their first aerial victories and seeing extensive service during the Vietnam War. Some North Vietnamese pilots preferred the MiG-17 over the MiG-21 because it was more agile, though not as fast; three of the 16 VPAF Aces of the war (credited with shooting down five or more opposing aircraft) were from MiG-17s. Those were: Nguyen Van Bay (seven victories), Luu Huy Chao and Le Hai (both with six). The rest gained ace status in MiG-21s.

==== MiG-17/J-5 aerial victories Vietnam 1965–1972 ====
This table lists VPAF and Chinese air-to-air kills. Sources include Hobson p. 271 and Toperczer (#25) pp. 88–90.

| Date/year | MiG-17 unit | Weapon | Aircraft | Notes |
|---|---|---|---|---|
| 4/4/1965 | VPAF 921st Fighter Regiment | 23 mm/37 mm | (2) Republic F-105 Thunderchiefs | USAF 354th Tactical Fighter Squadron |
| 4/9/1965 | Unknown | 23 mm/37 mm | F-4B Phantom II | VF-96/Downed by Chinese MiGs |
| 6/20/1965 | Unknown | 23 mm/37 mm | F-4C | USAF 45th TFS |
| 4/12/1966 | Unknown | 23 mm/37 mm | KA-3B Skywarrior | USN VAH-4 Aerial Re-Fueller (Air Tanker)/Downed by Chinese MiGs |
| 4/19/1966 | Unknown | 23 mm/37 mm | A-1E Skyraider | USAF 602nd Air Commando Squadron |
| 6/21/1966 | 923rd Fighter Regiment | 23 mm/37 mm | Vought F-8E Crusader | USN VF-211 |
| 1966 | 923rd FR | 23 mm/37 mm | (4) F-105Ds, (2) F-8Es, (2) F-4Cs, (1) RC-47D | USAF 355th Tactical Fighter Wing, 354th TFS, 421st TFS, 433rd TFS, 555th TFS, 606th ACS. USN VF-111, VF-162. (3) F-105s and (2) F-4s were downed by unknown MiG units. |
| 4/19/1967 | 921st FR | 23 mm/37 mm | F-105F | USAF 357th TFS |
| 1967 | 923rd FR | 23 mm/37 mm | (1) A-1E, (3) F-4Cs, (1) A-4C Skyhawk, (1) F-4D | USAF 390th TFS, 433rd TFS, 602nd ACS; USN VA-76. F-4D downed by unknown MiG unit. (1) F-4C downed by Chinese MiGs. |
| 1968 | Unknown | 23 mm/37 mm | (2) F-4Ds, (1) F-105F | USAF 357th TFS, 435th TFS |
| 2/14/1968 | Unknown | 23 mm/37 mm | A-1H | USN VA-25/Downed by Chinese MiG |
| 7/11/1972 | 923rd FR | 23 mm/37 mm | F-4J | USN VF-103 |
| Total other: | 6 | | | |
| Total F-4s | 11 | | | |
| Total F-8s | 3 | | | |
| F-105s | 8 | | | |
| Total aircraft downed: | 28 | | | |
| Technical data: | The VPAF made no distinction between their MiG-17s and J-5s. Both mounted two 23 mm and one 37 mm cannons with enough ammunition for 5 seconds of continuous firing for all three guns. However the MiG-17 guns at a range of 1,500 m (5,000 ft) and with a two-second burst could strike an American jet with nearly 23 kg (50 lb) of metal. This contrasted to a two-second burst from US M61 Vulcan and Colt Mk 12 cannon 20 mm cannons which hit with an approximate 27 and 16 kg (60 and 35 lb) of metal respectively. | | | |

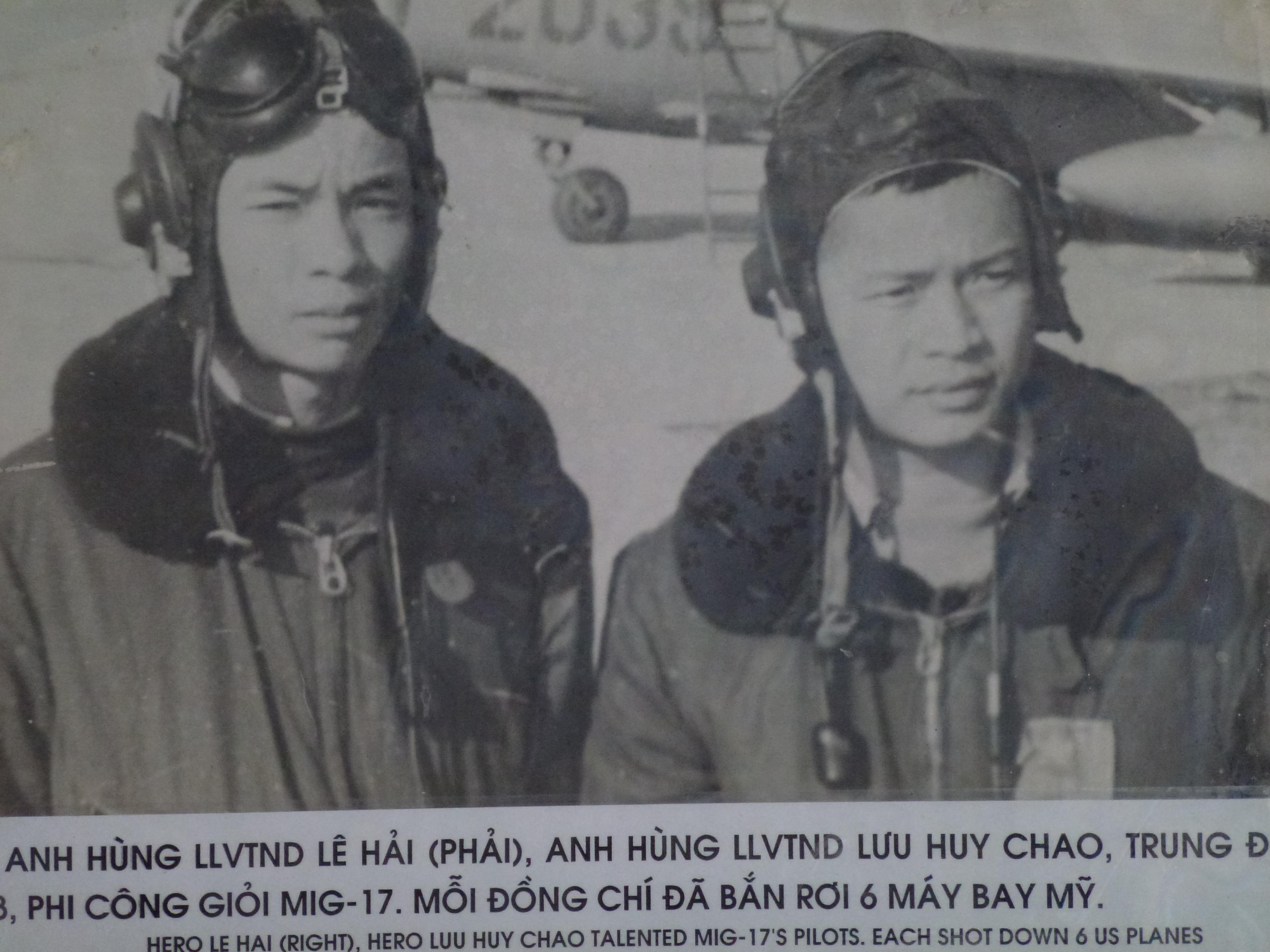
Luu Huy Chao and Le Hai, VPAF MIG 17 pilots, each credited with six aerial combat victories against U.S. planes in the skies over North Vietnam.

VPAF flew their interceptors with guidance from ground controllers, who directed the MiGs to ambush American formations. The MIGs made fast attacks against US formations from several directions (usually the MiG-17s performed head-on attacks and the MiG-21s attacked from the rear). After shooting down a few American planes and forcing some of the F-105s to drop their bombs prematurely, the MiGs did not wait for retaliation, but disengaged rapidly. This "guerrilla warfare in the air" proved very successful.

The MiG-17 was not originally designed to function as a fighter-bomber, but in 1971 Hanoi directed that United States Navy warships were to be attacked by elements of the VPAF. This would require the MiG-17 to be fitted with bomb mountings and release mechanisms. Chief Engineer of the VPAF ground crews, Truong Khanh Chau, was tasked with the mission of modifying two MiG-17s for the ground attack role; after three months of work, the two jets were ready. On 19 April 1972, two pilots from the 923rd FR took their bomb laden MiG-17s and attacked the U.S. Navy destroyer USS Higbee and light cruiser USS Oklahoma City. Each MiG was armed with two 250 kg (550 lb) bombs. Pilot Le Xuan Di managed to hit the destroyer's aft 5" (127 mm) gun mount, destroying it, but inflicting no fatalities, as the crewmen had vacated the turret earlier due to a malfunction with the gun system.

From 1965 to 1972, MiG-17s from the VPAF 921st and 923rd FRs would claim 71 aerial victories against U.S. aircraft: 11 Crusaders, 16 F-105 Thunderchiefs, 32 F-4 Phantom IIs, two A-4 Skyhawks, seven A-1 Skyraiders, one C-47 cargo/transport aircraft, one Sikorsky CH-3C helicopter and one Ryan Firebee UAV, while VPAF lost 63 MiG-17s in air combat. According to Russian sources, from 1965 to 1972, MiG-17s from the VPAF shot down 143 enemy aircraft and helicopters, while VPAF lost 75 MiG-17s through all causes and 49 pilots were killed.

The American fighter community was shocked in 1965 when elderly, subsonic MiG-17s downed sophisticated Mach-2-class F-105 Thunderchief fighter-bombers over North Vietnam. As a result of these experiences the U.S. Air Force initiated project "Feather Duster" aimed at developing tactics that would enable the heavier American fighters to deal with smaller and more agile opponents like the MiG-17. To simulate the MiG-17 the U.S. Air Force chose the F-86H Sabre. One pilot who participated in the project remarked that "In any envelope except nose down and full throttle", either the F-100 or F-105 was inferior to the F-86H in a dogfight. The project was generally successful in that the resulting tactics effectively minimized the disadvantages of the F-105, F-100 and other heavy American fighters while minimising the advantages of slower but more manoeuvrable fighters such as the F-86 and the MiG-17.

==== Cambodian–Vietnamese War ====
During the Vietnamese invasion of Democratic Kampuchea in January 1979, the recently unified Vietnamese People's Air Force reportedly conducted airstrikes against Cambodian positions with Chinese-supplied Shenyang F-5s alongside US-made aircraft captured from the former South Vietnam Air Force.

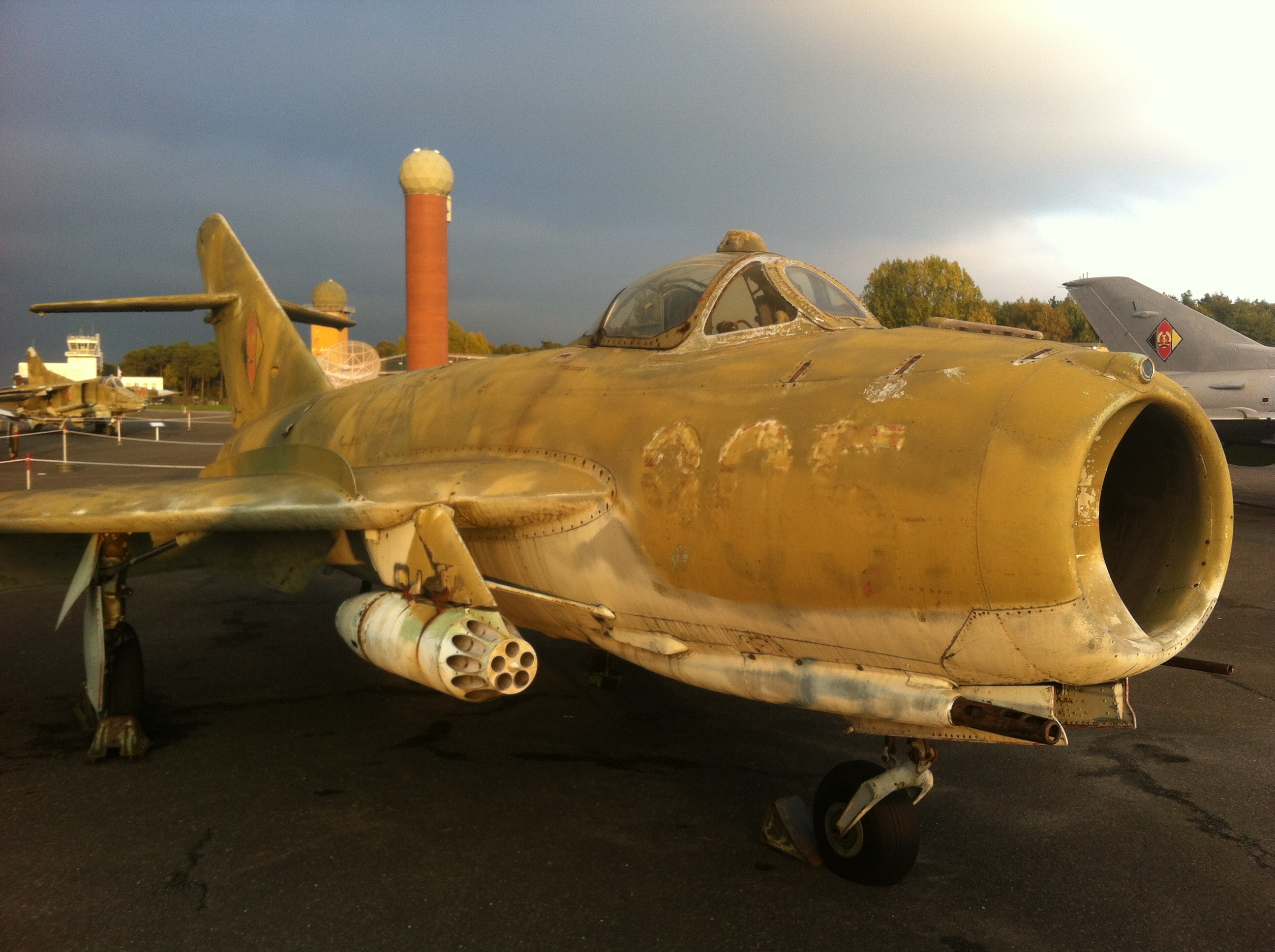
East German MiG-17F.

=== Egypt and Syria ===
The Egyptian Air Force received its first MiG-17s in 1956 and Syria also operated the MiG-17, receiving 60 MiG-17Fs in 1957. The two air forces gradually switched the MiG-17 to ground-attack duties in the early 1960s, as the MiG-21 supplanted it in the interceptor role. Both air forces worked together during the United Arab Republic Era.

==== Suez Crisis ====
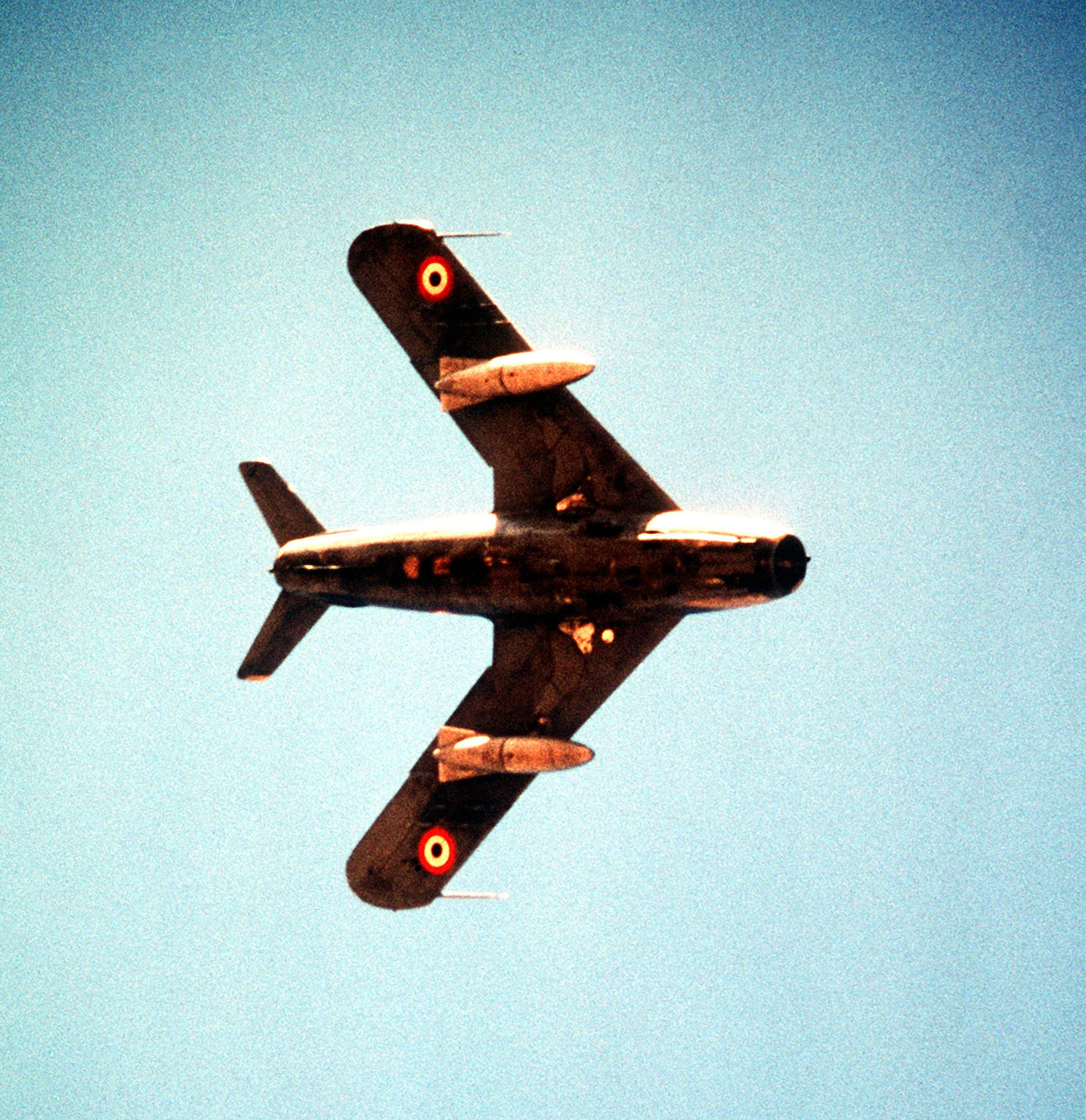
An Egyptian MiG-17

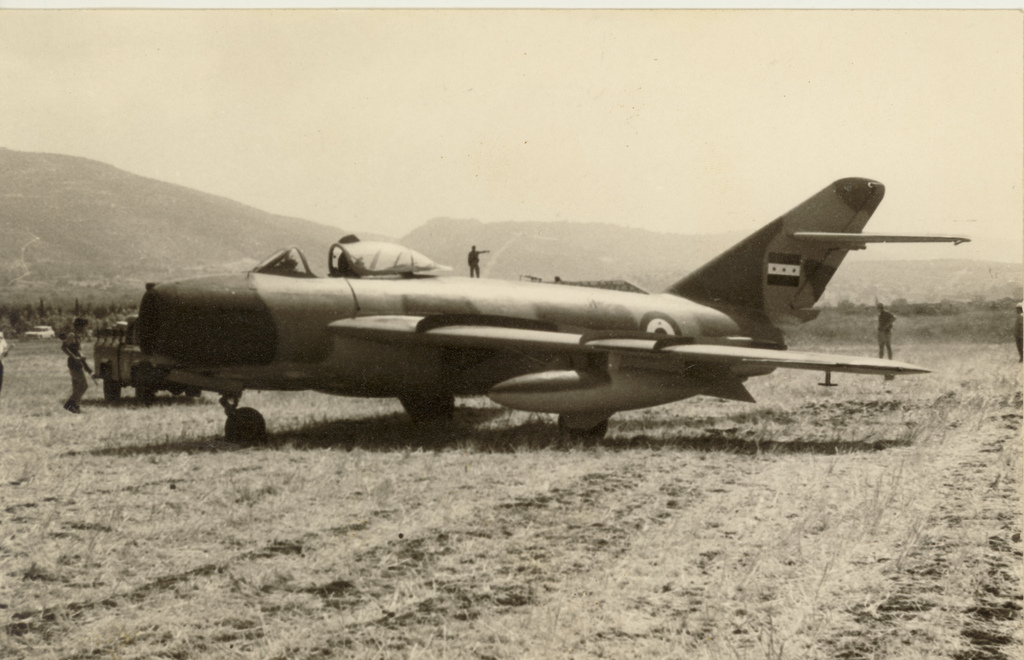
A Syrian MiG-17 in Betzet at a landing strip in 1968. The aircraft was sent to be evaluated at Have Drill.

Egyptian MiG-17s were deployed against the Israeli invasion of the Sinai during the early stages of the Suez Crisis. When Britain and France launched air attacks against Egyptian air bases on 1 November 1956, Egyptian president Gamal Abdel Nasser ordered the Egyptian Air Force not to oppose the Anglo-French air strikes, and where possible to evacuate its aircraft to Syria or Saudi Arabia, so while Egypt lost large numbers of aircraft, including MiG-17s, losses of pilots were relatively low. The losses were quickly replaced after the end of the war, and by June 1957 Egypt had about 100 MiG-17s.

==== Egyptian Intervention in Yemen ====
From 1962, Egyptian forces became involved in the North Yemen Civil War, supporting the republican government, with Egyptian MiG-17s flying ground attack operations.

==== Six-Day War ====
The MiG-17 formed a major part of the Arab air strength during the Six-Day War in June 1967. The war started with a massive airstrike by Israel against Egyptian, Jordanian, Syrian and Iraqi airbases, with more than 150 Egyptian aircraft destroyed or damaged. Egypt's surviving MiG-17s were heavily deployed in ground attacks against Israeli forces in the Sinai.

==== War of Attrition ====
The Soviet Union again replaced Egypt's losses after the war, and Egypt was soon involved in the War of Attrition, a sustained series of armed clashes on and over Sinai, with Egypt's MiG-17s continuing to be used in the ground attack role. While the MiG-17 was slower and shorter-ranged than the Sukhoi Su-7 that was the other main component of Egypt's ground-attack forces, the MiG-17 was more manoeuvrable and sustained lower losses.

==== Yom Kippur War ====
The MiG-17 continued in use in the Yom Kippur War. MiG-17s were used during the Ofira Air Battle by Egypt. Egyptian and Syrian MiG-17s retired shortly after these wars.

==== Egyptian Intervention in Sudan ====
From 1970, Egypt deployed detachments of MiG-17s to Sudan to support government forces during the First Sudanese Civil War.

=== Nigeria ===
==== Nigerian Civil War ====
At least 24 of them served with the Nigerian Air Force and were flown by a mixed group of Nigerian and mercenary pilots from East Germany, Soviet Union, South Africa, the United Kingdom, and Australia during the 1967–70 Nigerian Civil War. Two Kill claims by Nigerian MiG-17s are known, one on the 21 March 1969 against a C-47 which crashed at Uli and another against a DC-7 (Reg. No. SE-ERP) of the Swiss Red Cross resulting in four fatalities on 5 June 1969 by a pilot name Gbadamosi King.

=== Guinea ===
During Operation Green Sea, the Portuguese attempted to destroy the Guinean Air Force MiG-17s on the ground since tests revelead that their Fiat G.91s (with or without AIM-9 Sidewinder missiles) were outclassed by the MiG, but the Guineans relocated their aircraft to Labé two days earlier. Nearly seven hours after the raid in Conakry a single MiG-17F appeared over the port, but instead of attacking the Portuguese flotilla, it misidentified and strafed the Cuban freighter Conrado Benitez. Despite the poor performance of the Guinean Air Force, their MiG fleet remained a concern for the Portuguese commander António de Spínola.

=== Guinea - Bissau ===
In 1979, a MiG-17 of the Guinea-Bissau Air Force downed a South African Piper Comanche with its cannons.

=== Indonesia ===
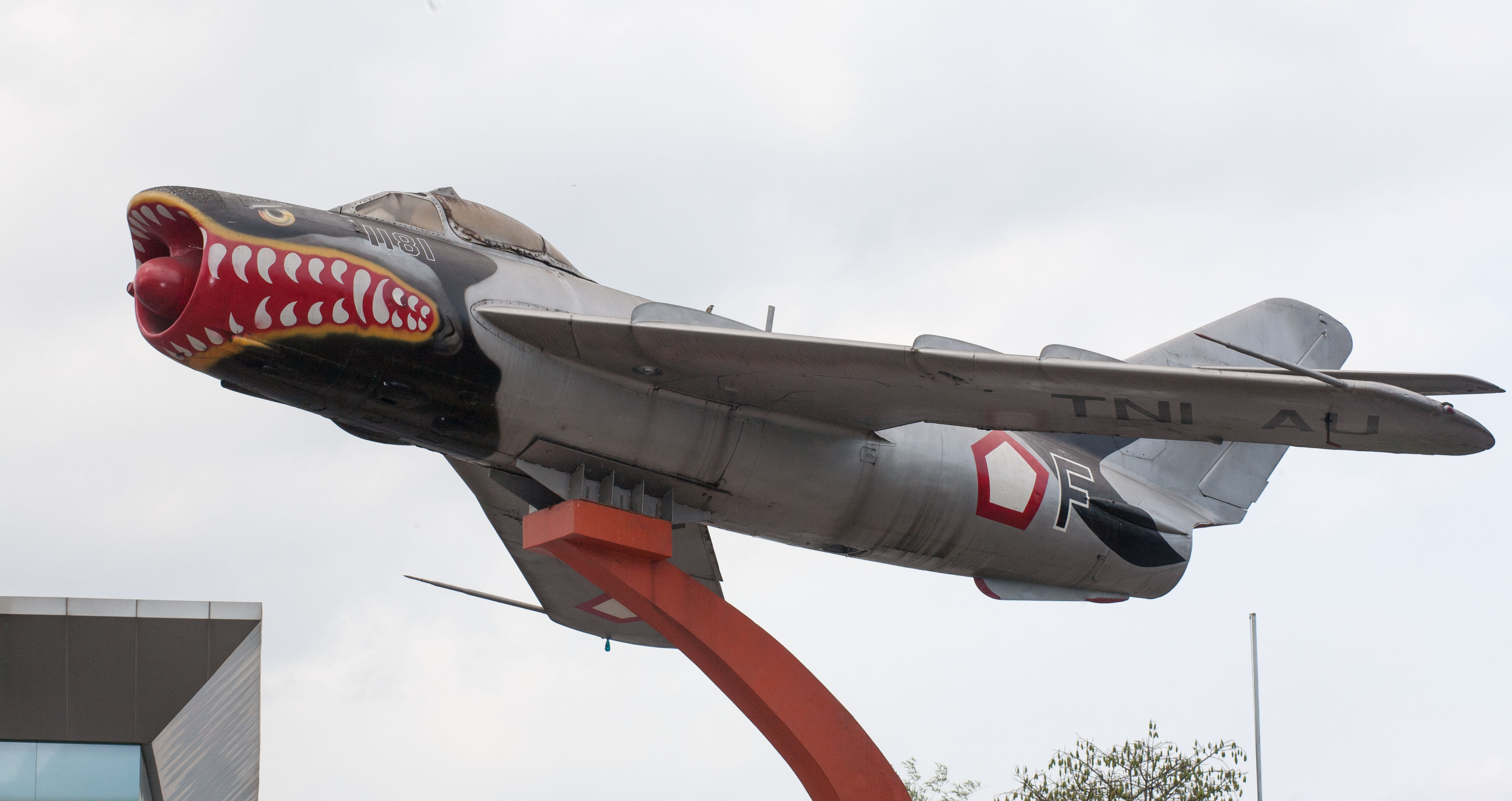
A plinthed Indonesian Lim-5P

Indonesian Air Force received up to 65 MiG-17 in 1959, consisted of Chinese-built Shenyang Type 56 and Polish-built Lim-5 and Lim-5P.

==== Permesta Incident ====
On 9 March 1960, an Indonesian Air Force pilot affiliated with the Permesta movement strafed several strategic locations in the capital Jakarta, including the presidential palace, using a MiG-17 with tail number "F-1112".

==== Annexation of Dutch New Guinea ====
During the Operation Trikora in 1961–1962, MiG-17s were deployed to the frontline airfields of Amahai, Morotai and Letfuan in eastern Indonesia to provide air cover against potential attack by the Dutch.

The deterioration of relationships with Eastern Bloc countries following the 30 September Movement in 1965 and its subsequent anti-communist purge caused the Indonesian MiG-17 fleet to suffer maintenance problems due to lack of spare parts and support from foreign expert technicians. The MiG-17 along with most Eastern Bloc type aircraft still in Indonesian service were grounded in 1970. Two Lim-5 were sold to the United States in early 1970s and used by the USAF's 4477th Test and Evaluation Squadron.

=== Sri Lanka ===
Four were hurriedly supplied by the USSR to Sri Lanka during the 1971 insurgency and were used for bombing and ground attack in the brief insurgency.

=== Soviet Union ===
In 1958, a US Air Force Lockheed C-130 was shot down by four MiG-17 fighters when it flew into Soviet airspace near Yerevan, Armenia while on a Sun Valley Signal intelligence mission, with all 17 crew killed.

=== United States ===
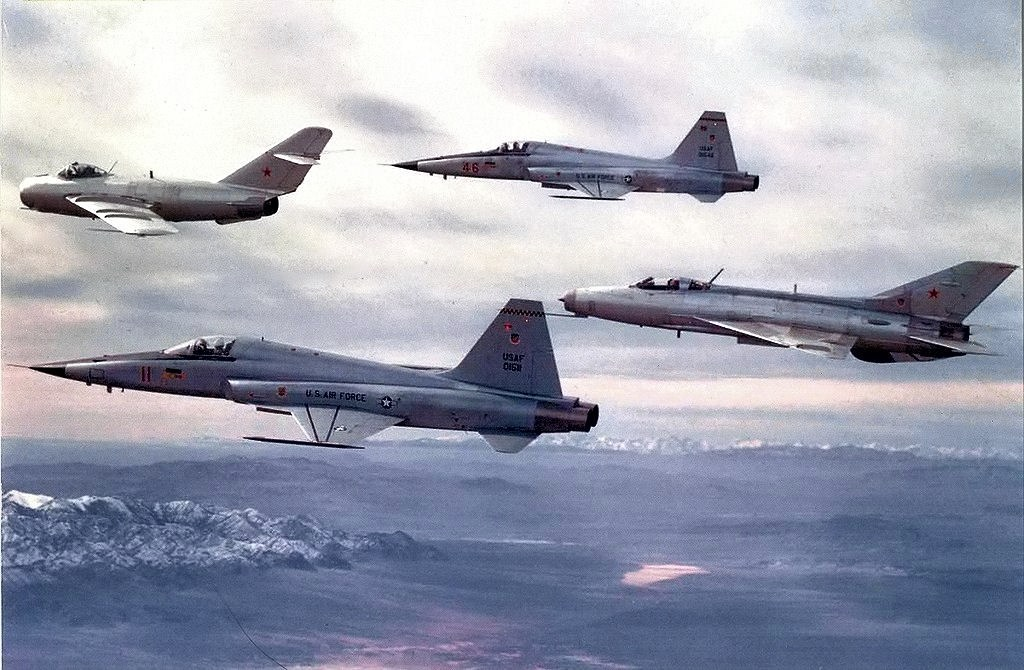
Two 64th Fighter Weapons Squadron F-5s with a 4477th TEF MiG-17 (leading) and MiG-21 (trailing) in 1979. Note the Tactical Air Command badge applied to the vertical fin of the MiG-21 on the right.

A number of U.S. federal agencies undertook a program at Groom Lake to evaluate the MiG-17 to help fight the Vietnam War, as the kill ratio against North Vietnamese MiG-17s and MiG-21s was only 2:1. The program was code-named HAVE DRILL (see also Have Doughnut), involving trials of two ex-Syrian MiG-17F Frescos, acquired and provided by Israel, over the skies of Groom Lake. These aircraft were given USAF designations and fake serial numbers so that they may be identified in DOD standard flight logs.

In addition to tracking the dogfights staged between the various MiG models against virtually every fighter in U.S. service, and against SAC's B-52 Stratofortresses and B-58 Hustlers to test the ability of the bombers’ countermeasures systems, they also performed radar cross-section and propulsion tests that contributed greatly to improvements in U.S. aerial performance in Vietnam.

==== Civil Operators ====
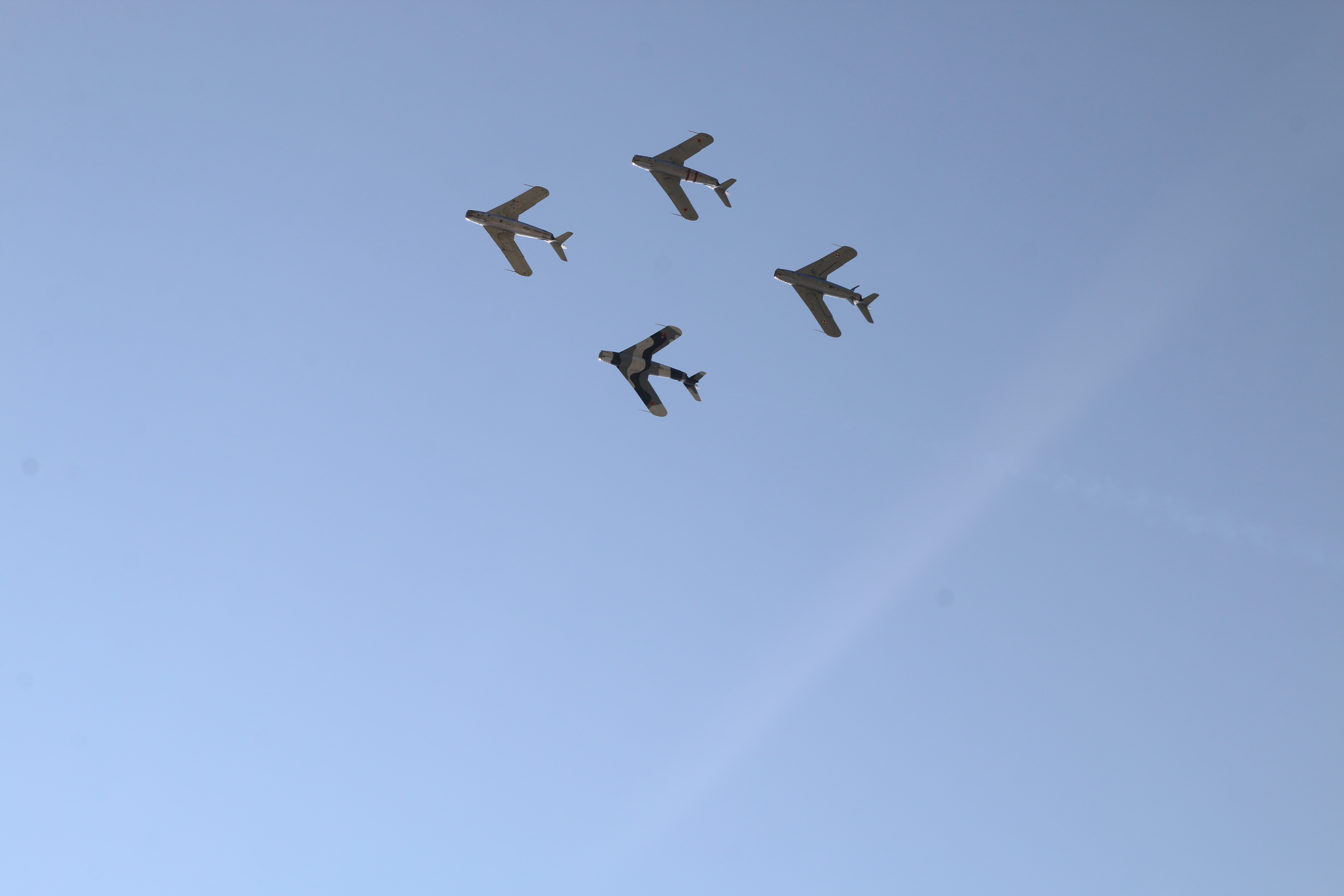
Four privately owned MiG-17s flying in formation at EAA AirVenture 2024

According to the Federal Aviation Administration, there are 17 privately owned MiG-17s in the US. Several MiG-17s have been seized due to questions over the legality of their import into the country.

== Variants ==
=== Prototype designations ===
I-330
(Russian: И-330) Designation of the Samolyot SI prototypes.
I-340
(Russian: И-340) SI-02 prototype modified to serve as a testbed for the Mikulin AM-5 engine. The original VK-1 engine was swapped out for two AM-5A engines; each delivering 2,000 kg (4,400 lb) of thrust. While the AM-5A lacked an afterburner, two AM-5As provided more combined thrust than the afterburning VK-1F fitted to the MiG-17F, while weighing 88 kg (194 lb) less than the latter engine. However, this was not enough to meet the design specifications set by the Council of Ministers for the engine. This led Aleksandr Mikulin to develop the afterburning AM-5F, which was subsequently tested on the I-340. This new engine still did not meet expectations, leading to the development of the AM-9 (later redesignated Tumansky RD-9B). Research conducted by the I-340 led to the development of the Mikoyan-Gurevich MiG-19.

=== Military designations ===
MiG-17
(Russian: МиГ-17) First production fighter variant based on the SI-02 prototype, originally powered by a Klimov VK-1 engine delivering 2,700 kg (6,000 lb) of thrust. Numerous changes were introduced along the production line:
- In September 1952, the area of the airbrakes was slightly increased.
- A one-piece canopy was developed to improve visibility.
MiG-17A
(Russian: МиГ-17А) Improved MiG-17 powered by VK-1A engine, which offered similar power to the VK-1 but had a higher lifespan.
MiG-17SA
(Russian: МиГ-17СА) Slightly upgraded MiG-17A.
MiG-17P
(Russian: МиГ-17П) All-weather fighter variant with a VK-1A engine, an RP-1 Izumrud radar mounted on the air intake, armed with either three or (possibly more commonly) two Nudelman-Rikhter NR-23 autocannons, and airbrakes enlarged by 0.97 m^{2} (10.4 sq ft). The MiG-17P was the first Soviet radar-equipped interceptor to enter service, though due to poor forward visibility on landing, it was only flown by above average pilots.
MiG-17F
(Russian: МиГ-17Ф) Improved fighter variant powered by an afterburning VK-1F engine, which delivered 2,600 kg (5,700 lb) of dry thrust or 3,380 kg (7,450 lb) with the afterburner. The new engine required numerous modifications to the original MiG-17 aircraft, including redesigning the rear fuselage and airbrakes. Armament remained the same as the MiG-17, while the MiG-17F was fitted with an ASP-4NM gunsight, an FKP-2 monitoring camera, and an RSIU-4V VHF radio. Numerous changes were introduced throughout the production run:
- From somewhere between aircraft 10–96onward, the MiG-17F were fitted with a negative-G fuel collector tank.
- From roughly aircraft 50 onward, a cold-air unit with automatic temperature control was added to the cockpit and the PPK-1 G-suit was made standard. The aircraft was also fitted with an improved nose-gear unit with an emergency extension system, GA-13M/3 automatic hydraulic control valve on the afterburner nozzle, and improved seat stabilization with a faceblind.
- Aircraft serial number 414351 onward featured an SRD-1 radar ranger linked to the gunsight and a Sirena-2 radar warning receiver.
MiG-17R
(Russian: МиГ-17Р) Proposed production version of the SR-2 prototype. Not built.
MiG-17F
(Russian: МиГ-17Ф) Foto (Photo) or Fotografia (Photograph), reconnaissance variant of the similarly-designated MiG-17F fighter fitted with the nose of the SR-2 prototype, which mounted a camera under the cockpit and an armament of two NR-23 autocannons; one on each side.

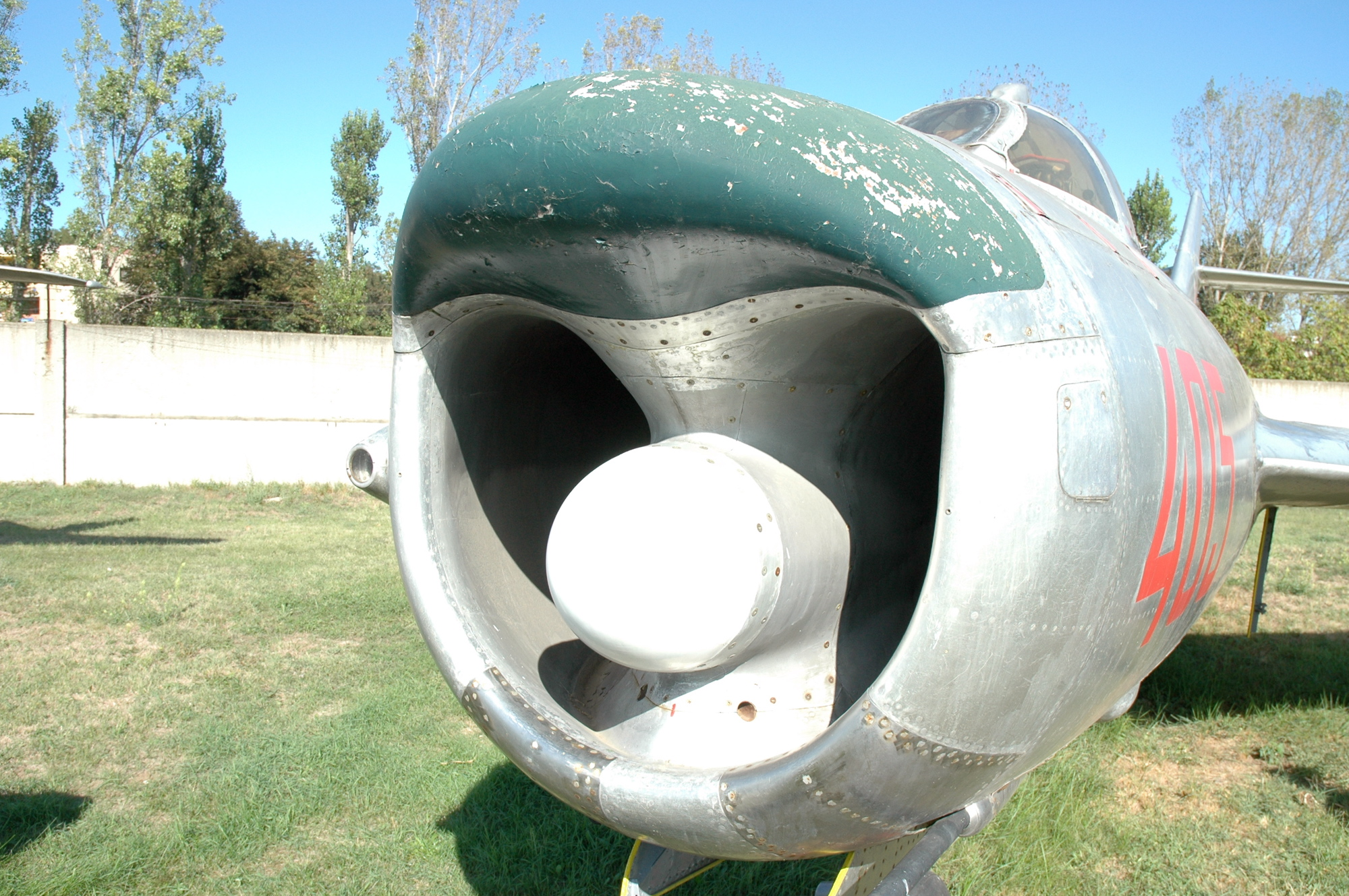
Izumrud radar on a Hungarian MiG-17PF.

MiG-17PF
(Russian: МиГ-17ПФ) Improved MiG-17P with the VK-1F engine and rear fuselage of the MiG-17F, an upgraded GSR-6000 electric generator, an SRD-1M radar ranger linked to the gunsight, a Sirena-2 radar warning receiver, and an NI-50B ground position indicator. Starting with the 25th aircraft of the sixth series, the RP-1 Izumrud radar was replaced with the RP-5 Izumrud.
MiG-17PFU
(Russian: МиГ-17ПФУ) Missile-armed variant of the MiG-17PF based on the SP-6 prototype with an RP-1U Izumrud radar and four APU-4 launch rails for K-5 air-to-air missiles. In addition to the K-5, the launch rails were compatible with the unguided ARS-190 and ARS-212M rockets. Unlike the prototype, the production MiG-17PFU was powered by a VK-1F engine and lacked gun armament. In addition to new builds, some MiG-17PFs were upgraded to MiG-17PFU standard. By 1957, the MiG-17PFU had been upgraded with an RP-2U Izumrud-2 radar and K-5M missiles. Alternatively known as the MiG-17PM.
MiG-17NBU
(Russian: МиГ-17НБУ) Testbed for an "irreversible" fully-powered flight system.
MiG-17GU
(Russian: МиГ-17ГУ) Either a testbed similar to the MiG-17NBU or an alternative designation for the latter.
MiG-17M
(Russian: МиГ-17М) Conversion of a MiG-17 into a testbed for an unmanned target drone.
MiG-17MM
(Russian: МиГ-17ММ) Either a testbed similar to the MiG-17M or an alternative designation for the latter.

=== OKB designations ===
Samolyot SI-1
(Russian: Самолёт СИ-1) First prototype converted from a MiG-15bis. This aircraft was never flown and was instead used as a static-test airframe.
Samolyot SI-2
(Russian: Самолёт СИ-2) Second prototype converted from a MiG-15bis. Changes from the MiG-15 included an entirely new wing with a 45° inboard leading edge sweep, a 42° outboard sweep, increased wing area and anhedral, six wing fences, a thinner airfoil (TsAGI S-12s at the root and TsAGI SR-11 at the tip), a lengthened fuselage, and an increased airbrake area of 1.76 m^{2} (18.9 sq ft). Armament was unchanged, consisting of a single N-37D autocannon with 42 rounds and two NR-23 autocannons with 80 rounds each. Avionics included an RSIU-3 Klen VHF radio, an SRO-1 Bariy-M IFF transponder, an OSP-48 lnstrument landing system with an ARK-5 Amur direction finder, an MRP-48 Khrizantema marker receiver, and an RV-2 Kristall radio altimeter.
Samolyot SI-3
(Russian: Самолёт СИ-3) Unbuilt prototype.
Samolyot SI-02
(Russian: Самолёт СИ-02) Third prototype converted from a MiG-15bis. This prototype differed from the SI-2 primarily in the correction of the faulty elevator circuit that led to the loss of the latter. Flight testing of the SI-02 proved satisfactory, and the aircraft was ordered into production as the MiG-17. This aircraft was later modified into the I-340 (Samolyot SM-1) prototype. Not to be confused with the SI-2.
Samolyot SI-01
(Russian: Самолёт СИ-01) Fourth prototype converted from a MiG-15bis. While construction of this prototype started before the SI-02, production issued led to the SI-01's completion being delayed until after the latter. Not to be confused with the SI-1.
Samolyot SI
(Russian: Самолёт СИ) OKB designation of the production MiG-17, based on the SI-02 and SI-01 prototypes.
Samolyot SI-05
(Russian: Самолёт СИ-05) Testbed for weapons systems.
Samolyot SI-07
(Russian: Самолёт СИ-07) Testbed for weapons systems.
Samolyot SI-10
(Russian: Самолёт СИ-10) Single MiG-17A modified with new Fowler flaps, leading-edge slats, and other improvements to enhance handling.
Samolyot SI-16
(Russian: Самолёт СИ-16) Testbed for the 57 mm N-57 autocannon, which replaced the N-37D on the right side. The SI-16 was also used to test rockets fired from short pods.
Samolyot SI-19
(Russian: Самолёт СИ-19) Testbed for the TRS-190 rocket on modified APU-4 pylons. The SI-19 was also used to test rockets fired from short pods.
Samolyot SI-21
(Russian: Самолёт СИ-21) Testbed for weapons systems.
Samolyot SI-21m
(Russian: Самолёт СИ-21м) Testbed for weapons systems.
Samolyot SI-91
(Russian: Самолёт СИ-91) Testbed for weapons systems.
Samolyot SP-2
(Russian: Самолёт СП-2) Experimental variant with an afterburning VK-1F engine and a Korshun interception radar. The SP-2 was also fitted with an S-13 camera on the right side of the nose. The N-37D cannon was removed, while ammo capacity for the NR-23 autocannons was increased to 120 rounds per gun. Capacity of the fuel tank under the jetpipe was increased to 195 L (52 US gal) to balance the increased weight of the nose. Flight testing revealed that while the SP-2 met the performance targets requested by the Council of Ministers, it did not offer much of an improvement over the existing MiG-17F. The tests also found that pilots had difficulty reading data from the Korshun radar, which also suffered from poor reliability. Due in part to these reasons, the SP-2 program was terminated. Not to be confused with the MiG-15 variant of the same name.
Samolyot SP-7
(Russian: Самолёт СП-7) Prototype of the MiG-17P converted from a single MiG-17 with a VK-1A engine, an RP-1 Izumrud radar installation similar to Samolyot SP-5, and armed with three NR-23 autocannons with 100 rounds each. The SP-7 lacked the enlarged airbrakes of the production MiG-17P.
Samolyot SP-7F
(Russian: Самолёт СП-7Ф) Prototype of the MiG-17PF with the VK-1F engine and rear fuselage of the MiG-17F, an upgraded GSR-6000 electric generator, an SRD-1M radar ranger linked to the gunsight, and a Sirena-2 radar warning receiver. The prototype lacked the NI-50B ground position indicator that became standard on production aircraft.
Samolyot SP-6
(Russian: Самолёт СП-6) Prototype of the MiG-17PFU with an RP-1U Izumrud radar and four APU-4 launch rails for K-5 air-to-air missiles. Unlike the production MiG-17PFU, the SP-6 was powered by a VK-1A engine and had a single NR-23 autocannon mounted on the right side of the nose.
Samolyot SP-8
(Russian: Самолёт СП-8) Testbed for the SRD-3 Grad radar ranger, Sneg head-up display. Though the Grad and Sneg systems themselves were not fitted to production aircraft, the tests resulted in many MiG-17s being retrofitted with ASP-4NM gunsights with Kvant radar rangers.
Samolyot SP-9
(Russian: Самолёт СП-9) Testbed for the RP-2U Izumrud-2 radar and the K-5M missile. The SP-9 was also used to test rocket pods attached under long pylons, with a ZP-6-Sh system to automatically fire the rockets in sequence. This aircraft had no guns.
Samolyot SP-10
(Russian: Самолёт СП-10) MiG-17PF converted to a testbed for a pair of unidentified twin-barrel 23 mm guns and the ARS-57 rocket.
Samolyot SR-2
(Russian: Самолёт СР-2) Prototype for a reconnaissance version of the MiG-17F with a redesigned forward fuselage mounting either an AFA-BA-21S or AFA-BA-40R camera under the cockpit and an armament of two NR-23 autocannons; one on each side. The pilot was equipped with an MAG-9 voice recorder, and the hydraulic elevator control was replaced with a servo. The aircraft was also powered by the experimental Klimov VK-5F engine with 3,000 kg (6,600 lb) of dry thrust and 3,850 kg (8,490 lb) afterburning thrust. While the Soviet Air Force was satisfied with the prototype's performance, it recommended that a production derivative be fitted with the original VK-1F engine due to the KV-5F's small increase in performance.
Samolyot SR-2s
(Russian: Самолёт СР-2с) OKB designation for the reconnaissance MiG-17F. Essentially a MiG-17F fighter with the nose of the SR-2.
Samolyot SF
(Russian: Самолёт СФ) OKB designation of the MiG-17F fighter.
Samolyot SM-1
(Russian: Самолёт СМ-1) OKB designation of the I-340 prototype.
Samolyot SN
(Russian: Самолёт СН) Experimental variant powered by a VK-1A engine with a redesigned nose with twin side intakes and an SV-25 armament installation, allowing three 23 mm TKB-495 autocannons to pivot to engage ground targets. The canopy was also modified to improve the pilot's field of view. Flight testing revealed poor performance, and the armament installation was described as "useless" as firing the guns in a tight turn would throw the aircraft off target.
Samolyot SDK-5
(Russian: Самолёт СДК-5) Testbed to complement the MiG-9L in developing the guidance system for the KS-1 Komet and later the Kh-20 cruise missiles. Not to be confused with the MiG-15 variant of the same name.

=== Chinese variants ===
J-4
Chinese designation for the Soviet-built MiG-17. Also known as the F-4.

=== Polish variants ===
Lim-5
Licensed production of the MiG-17F by PZL Mielec in Poland, powered by a Lis-5 engine (licensed VK-1F). Two prototypes and 222 production aircraft were built.
CM-I
Version of the Lim-5 developed with improved STOL performance. The aircraft was fitted with a Type SR JATO rocket and a Type SH-19 drogue parachute.
CM-II
Parallel development of the CM-I intended for operations from unpaved runways. Changes from the Lim-5 include redesigned main landing gear with low-pressure tires. The inboard wing was extended forward to accommodate the greater retracted landing gear depth while also maintaining the thickness/chord ratio, and a large wing fence was added between the inner and outer wing surfaces. The rear fuselage tanks were enlarged for balance, and the plumbing for external fuel tanks was removed from the outer wing pylons, which could now carry only weapons. Two prototypes were built.
Lim-5M
Production variant of the CM-II. 60 built. The aircraft suffered from poor handling at high speeds, and all surviving aircraft were eventually converted to Lim-6bis standard.
Lim-5P
Licensed production of the MiG-17P with no modifications. 129 built.
Lim-5MR
Proposed reconnaissance variant with an increased wingspan and wingtip pods for either AFA-39, AFA-BA/40R, AFA-BA/21S, or AFP-21 cameras. Not built.

=== Czechoslovak variants ===
S-104
Designation of the MiG-17 license-built in Czechoslovakia.

=== East German variants ===
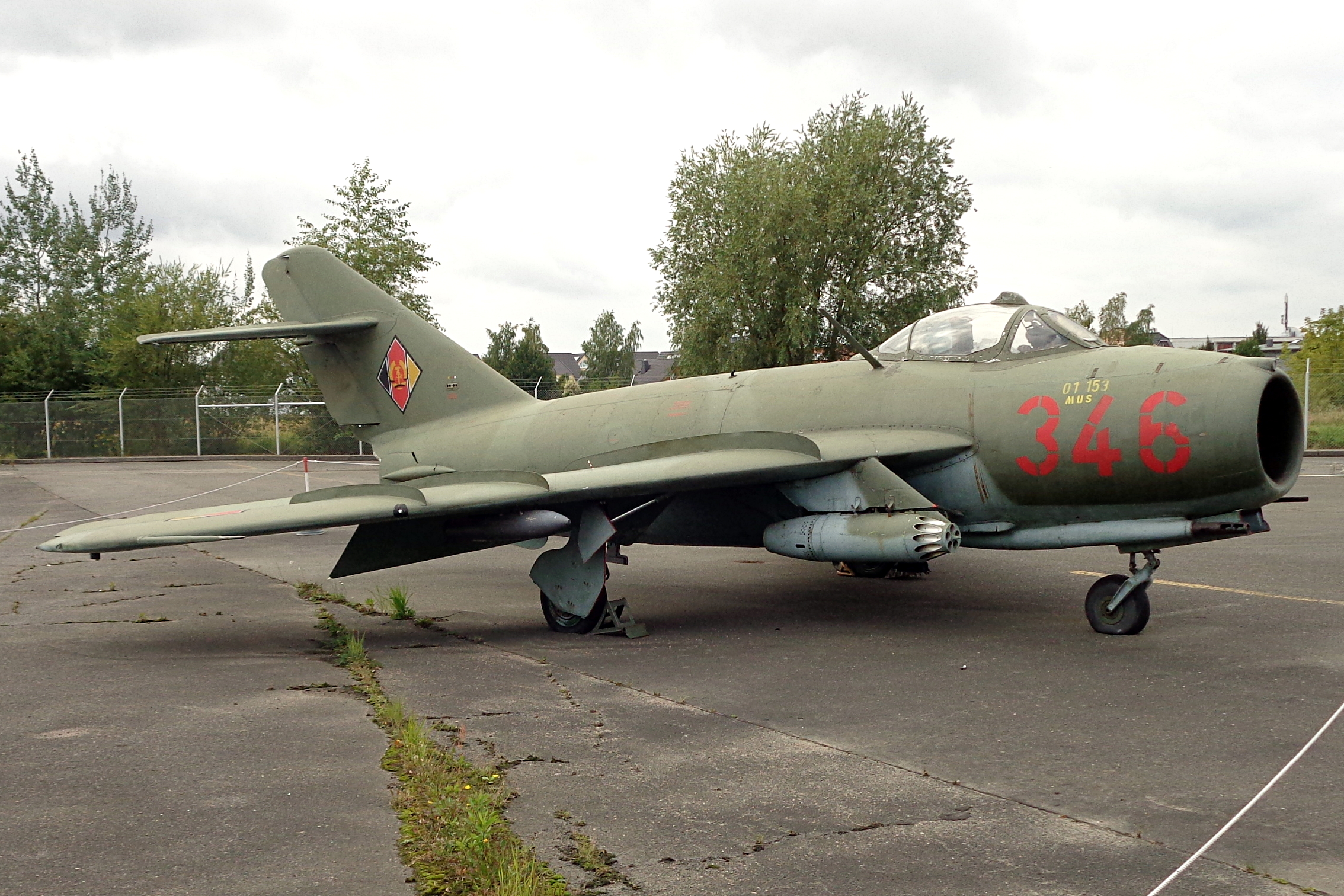
East German MiG-17F fighter-bomber conversion

MiG-17F fighter-bomber
MiG-17F fighters converted in 1973 with underwing pylons for MARS-2 rocket pods, an RV-UM radio altimeter, an ASP-4NM, and other avionics changes. These conversions used parts supplied from Poland.

=== American designations ===
YF-113B
Covert designation of a captured MiG-17F used for the Have Drill flight testing program.

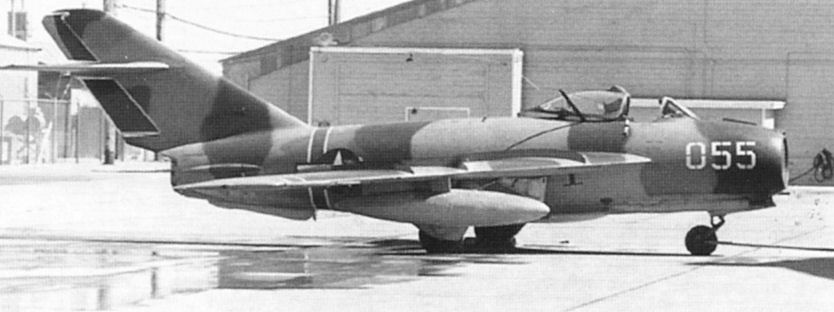
YF-114C used in the Have Ferry evaluation program

YF-114C
Covert designation of a captured MiG-17F used for the Have Ferry flight testing program.
YF-114D
Covert designation of a captured MiG-17PF.

=== Foreign reporting names ===
Fresco-A
NATO reporting name for the original MiG-17.
Fresco-B
NATO reporting name for the MiG-17P.
Fresco-C
NATO reporting name for the MiG-17F fighter.
Fresco-D
NATO reporting name for the MiG-17P and MiG-17PF.
Fresco-E
NATO reporting name for the MiG-17PFU.

== Operators ==
=== Current operators ===
North Korea

- Korean People's Army Air Force – 106 Shenyang F-5s and 135 Shenyang FT-5s are in service. However, reports of dire levels of serviceability suggest an airworthiness rate of less than 50%.

=== Former operators ===
Afghanistan

- Afghan Air Force – Received 100 MiG-17s in 1957–1959. 50 remained operational in 1979. Remained mostly grounded by the end of 1980.

Albania

- Albanian Air Force – operated both Soviet-built MiG-17F and Chinese-built F-5s.

Algeria

- Algerian Air Force – operated 60 MiG-17Fs from the 1960s. Some remained in service as trainers in the late 1980s.

Angola

- Angolan Air Force

Bulgaria

- Bulgarian Air Force – operated MiG-17Fs, 17-PFs and 17-Rs.

Burkina Faso

- Burkina Faso Air Force

Cambodia

- Royal Cambodian Air Force – 16 aircraft, including five MiG-17s and 11 Shenyang J-5s were received from the Soviet Union and China in 1967–1968, later all were destroyed on the ground in 1971.
  - Khmer Republic
    - Khmer Air Force
  - Democratic Kampuchea
    - Kampuchean Revolutionary Army

China

- People's Liberation Army Air Force – They were operated under the designation J-4 against MiG-17s provided by the Soviet Union, until they were replaced by the J-5, a license-built version of the MiG-17, at which point they were discontinued.
- People's Liberation Army Naval Air Force

Republic of the Congo

- Congolese Air Force

Cuba

- Cuban Revolutionary Air and Air Defense Force – 75 were in service in 1979

Czechoslovakia

- Czechoslovak Air Force

East Germany

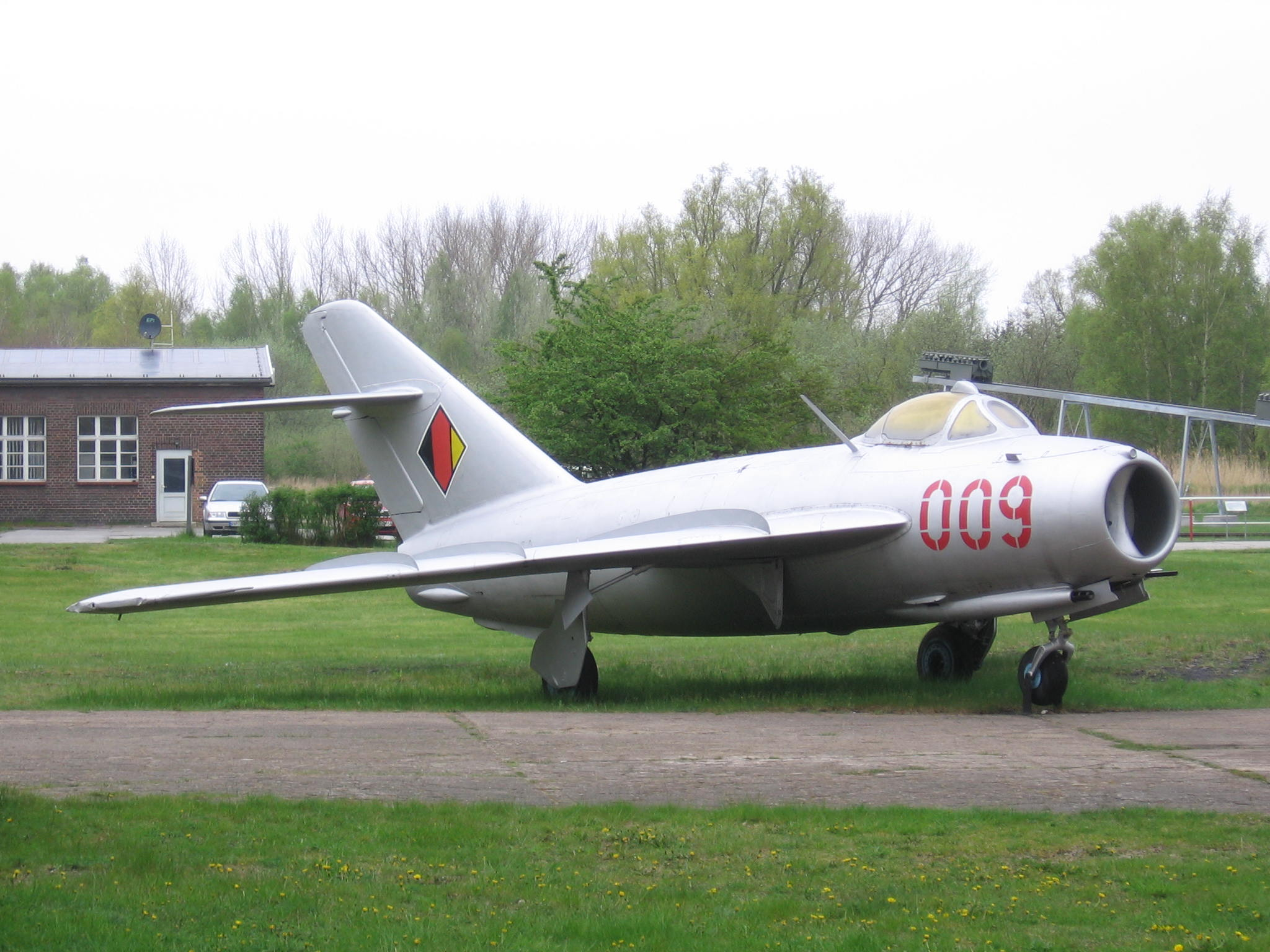
East German MiG-17

- Air Forces of the National People's Army

Egypt

- Egyptian Air Force

Ethiopia

- Ethiopian Air Force

Guinea

- Guinea Air Force

Guinea-Bissau

- Guinea-Bissau Air Force – Operated two MiG-17Fs

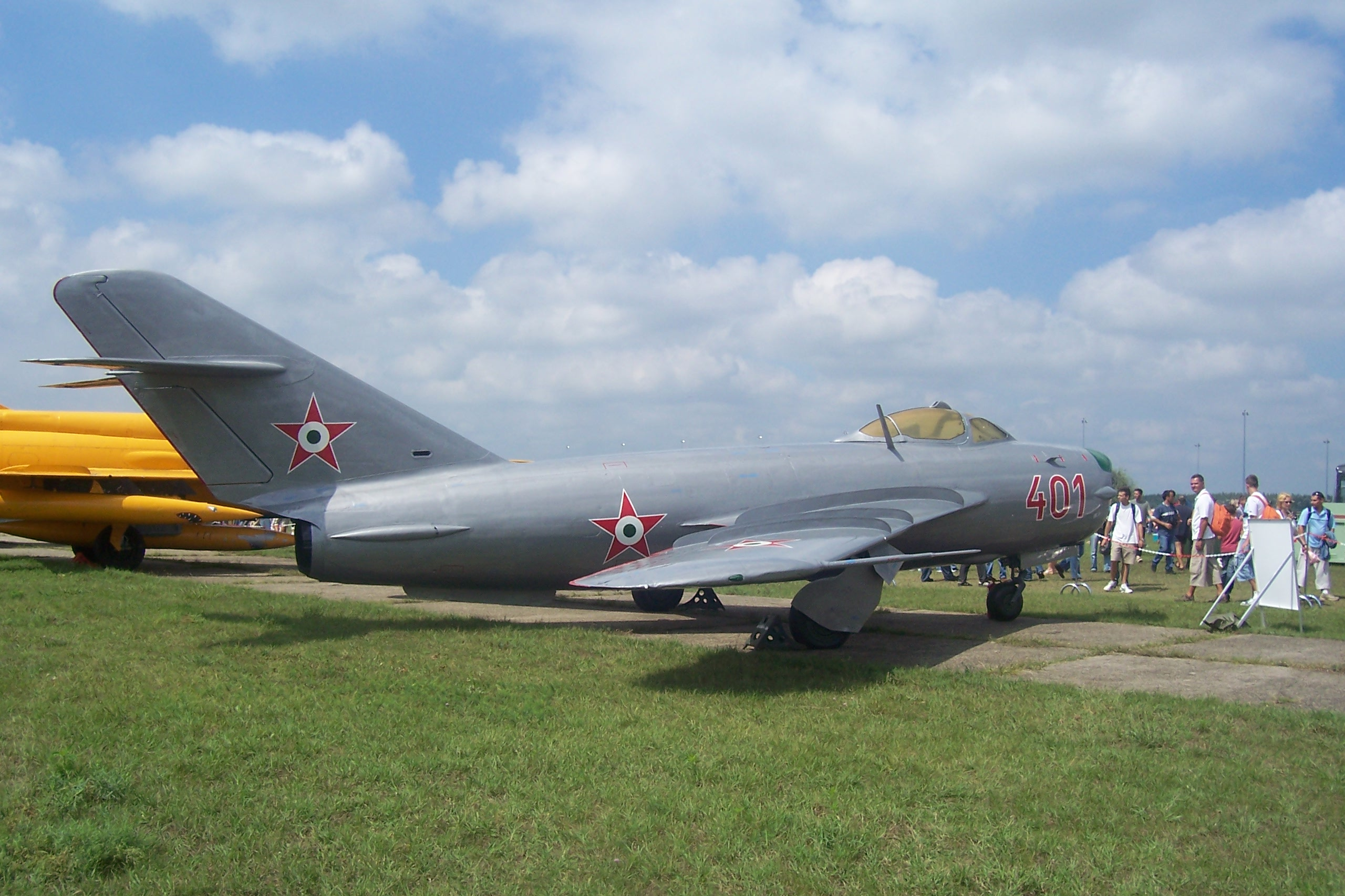
A restored Hungarian People's Army Air Force MiG-17PF on display in Kecskemét

Hungarian People's Republic

- Hungarian People's Army Air Force

Indonesia

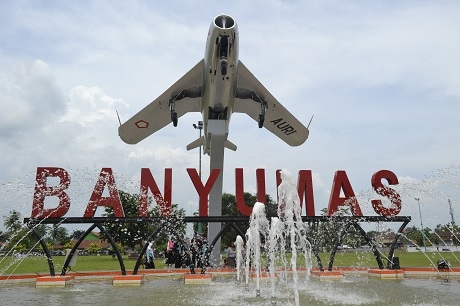
An Indonesian Air Force MiG-17 display monument in Banyumas Regency

- Indonesian Air Force

Iraq

- Iraqi Air Force

Madagascar

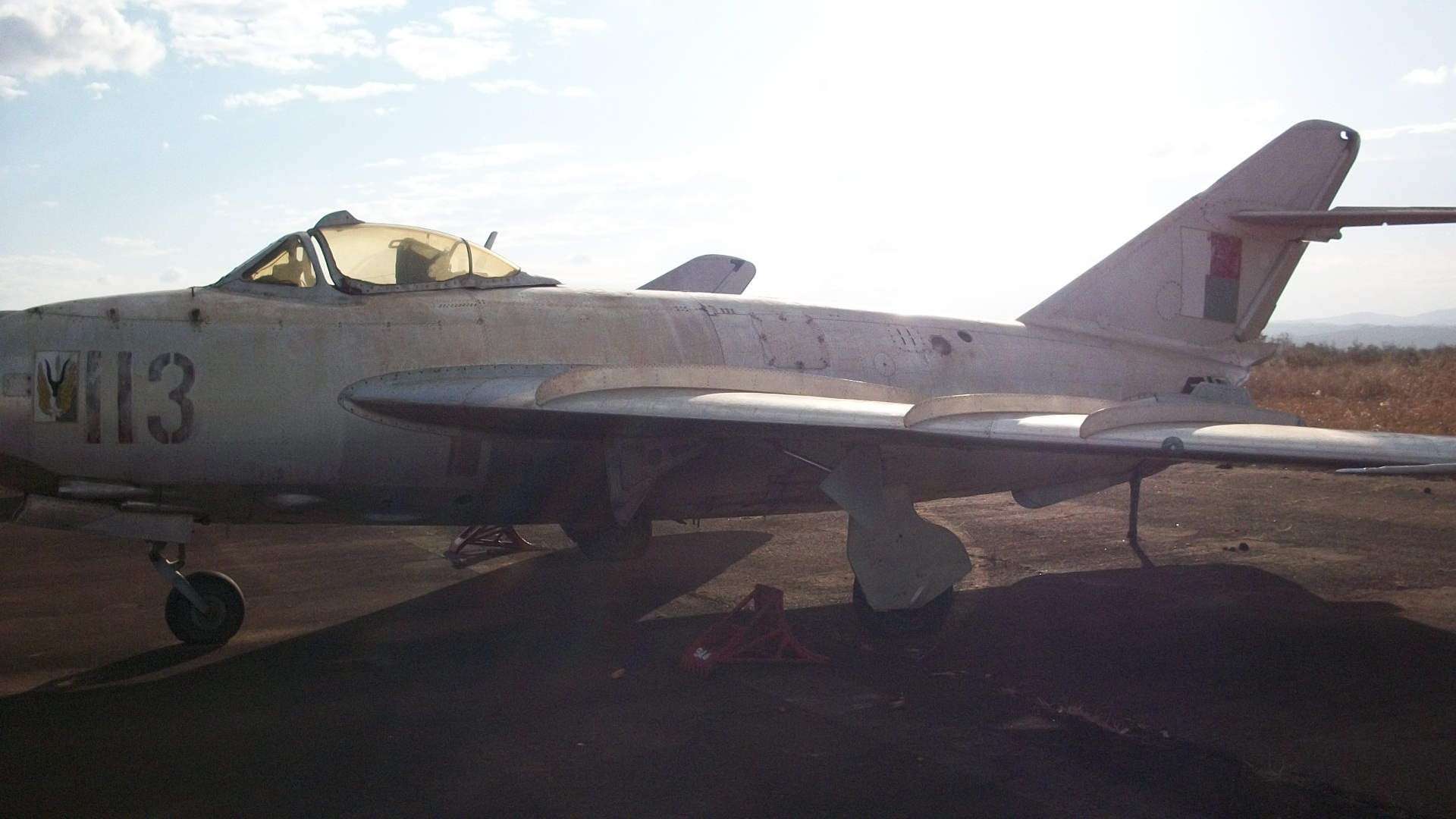
MiG-17 of the Malagasy Air Force.

- Malagasy Air Force – 4 delivered in 1975 from North Korea.

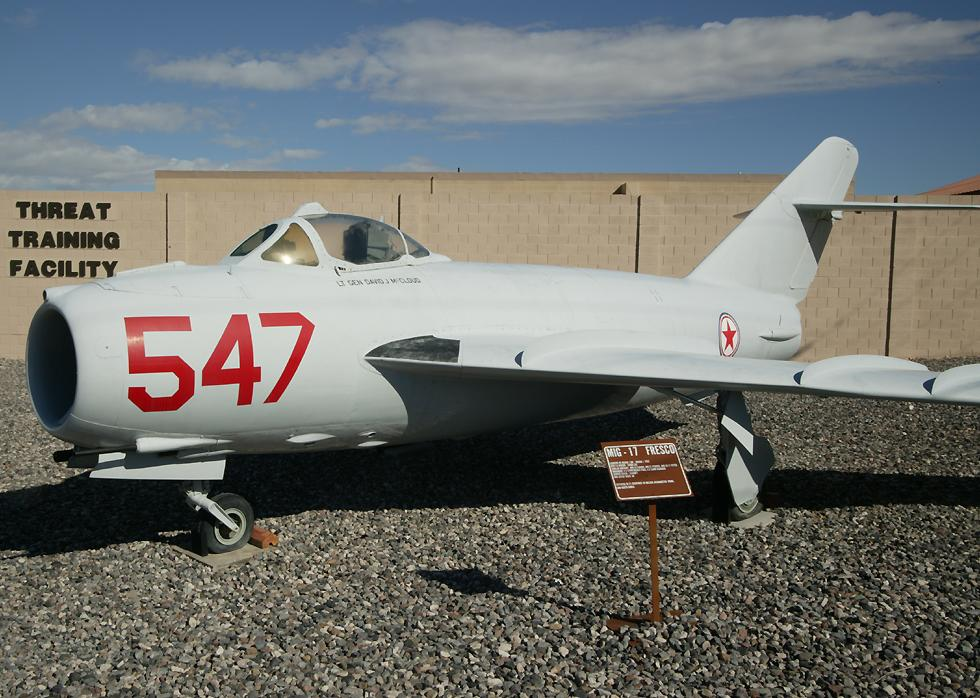
A former Indonesian Lim-5 on display in the United States in North Korean markings

Mali

- Malian Air Force

Mongolia

- Mongolian People's Army Air Force

Morocco

- Royal Moroccan Air Force

Mozambique

- Mozambique Air Force

Nigeria

- Nigerian Air Force

North Yemen

- Yemen Arab Republic Air Force – 13 MiG-17s donated by the USSR in November 1967.

Poland

- Polish Air Force
- Polish Navy

Romania

- Romanian Air Force

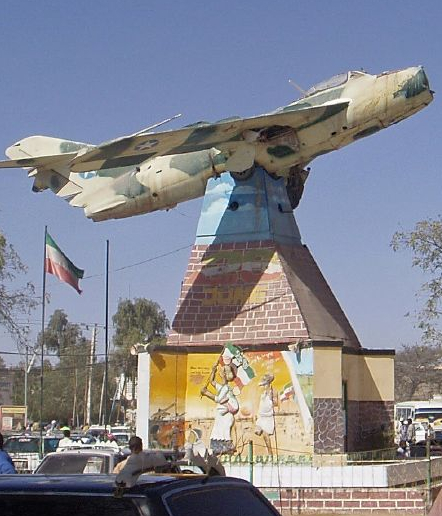
A Somali MiG-17 as part of a monument in Hargeysa

Somalia

- Somali Aeronautical Corps – In 1967, 30 MiG-17 and MiG-17F were delivered by the Soviet Union. In 1991 the Air Force was dissolved.

South Yemen

- People's Democratic Republic of Yemen Air Force – First ten MiG-17Fs delivered from the USSR in January 1969. Eight additional aircraft were delivered in 1971.

Soviet Union

- Soviet Air Forces
- Soviet Air Defense Forces
- Soviet Naval Aviation

Sri Lanka

- Sri Lanka Air Force − 5 MiG-17F were in service in 1979. In 1991, two Shenyang FT-5 (MiG-17U) trainers were obtained from China. Now preserved in SLAF Ratmalana museum.

Syria

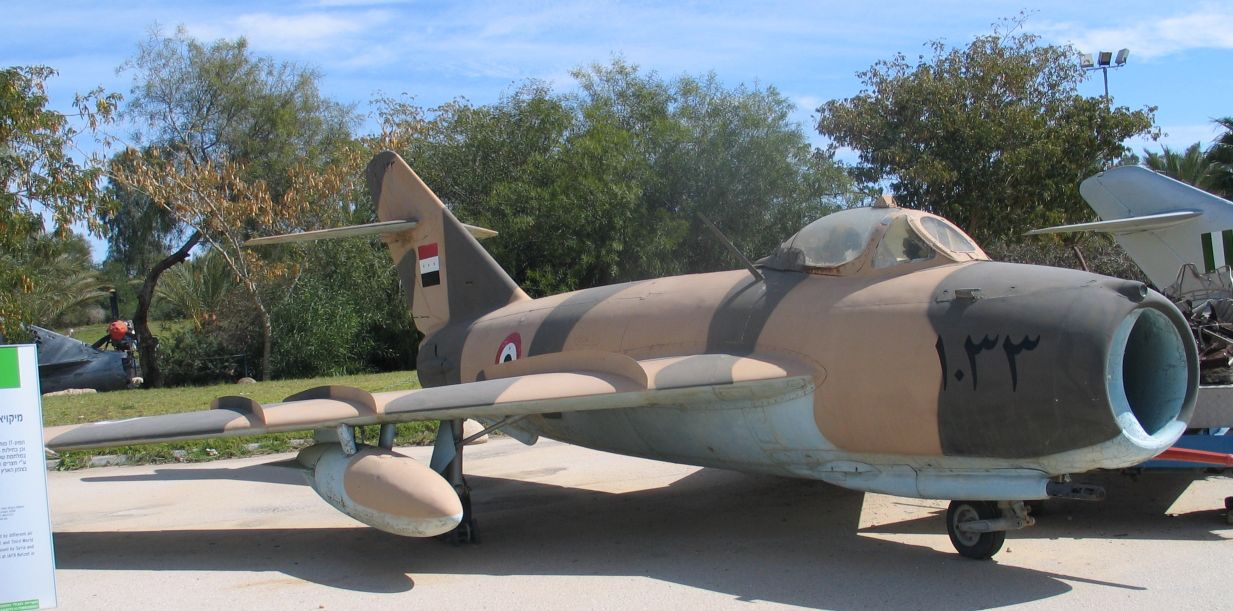
Syrian MiG-17 at the Israeli Air Force Museum

- Syrian Air Force

Uganda

- Ugandan Air Force – Some ex-Czech; serviceability doubtful.

Vietnam

- Vietnam People's Air Force

=== Former evaluation-only operators ===
South Africa
United States

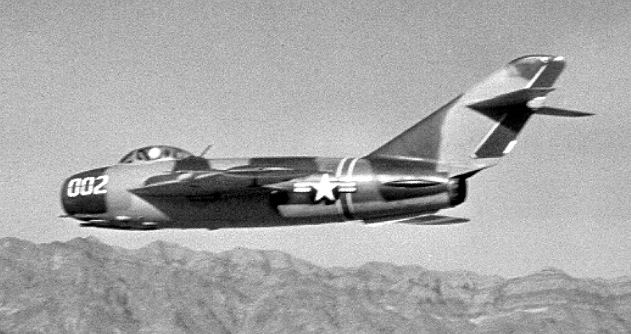
Soviet MiG-17F in USAF use

- Formerly used for evaluation in the United States Air Force, however in January 2014 a camouflaged example was seen operating near Edwards AFB, possibly as a training vehicle at the USAF Test Pilot School where MiG-15s are routinely operated.

== Specifications (MiG-17F) ==
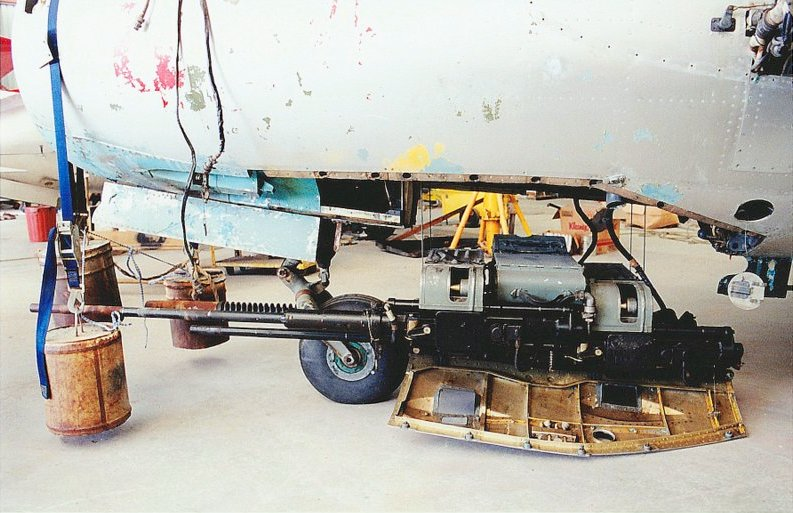
Twin 23 mm Nudelman-Rikhter NR-23 cannon winched down from the nose of a Polish-built Lim-6 (MiG-17F); a third 37 mm Nudelman N-37 cannon was also fitted.

Data from Combat Aircraft since 1945, MiG: Fifty Years of Secret Aircraft Design

General characteristics

- Crew: 1
- Length: 11.264 m (36 ft 11 in)
- Wingspan: 9.628 m (31 ft 7 in)
- Height: 3.8 m (12 ft 6 in)
- Wing area: 22.6 m^{2} (243 sq ft)
- Airfoil: root: TsAGI S-12; tip: TsAGI SR-11
- Empty weight: 3,919 kg (8,640 lb)
- Gross weight: 5,340 kg (11,773 lb)
- Max takeoff weight: 6,069 kg (13,380 lb)
- Powerplant: 1 × Klimov VK-1F afterburning centrifugal-flow turbojet engine, 26.5 kN (6,000 lbf) thrust dry, 33.8 kN (7,600 lbf) with afterburner

Performance

- Maximum speed: 1,100 km/h (680 mph, 590 kn) M0.89 at sea level

1,145 km/h (711 mph; 618 kn) / M0.93 at 3,000 m (9,800 ft) with reheat

- Range: 2,020 km (1,260 mi, 1,090 nmi) at 12,000 m (39,000 ft) with 2 × 400 L (110 US gal; 88 imp gal) drop-tanks
- Service ceiling: 16,600 m (54,500 ft)
- g limits: +8
- Rate of climb: 65 m/s (12,800 ft/min)
- Wing loading: 268.5 kg/m^{2} (55.0 lb/sq ft)
- Thrust/weight: 0.63

Armament

- Guns:
  - 2 × 23 mm (0.906 in) Nudelman-Rikhter NR-23 autocannon (80 rounds per gun, 160 rounds total)
  - 1 × 37 mm Nudelman N-37 autocannon (40 rounds total)
- Hardpoints: 2 pylons with a capacity of up to 500 kg (1,100 lb) of stores, with provisions to carry combinations of:
  - Rockets: 2 × UB-16-57 rocket pods for S-5 rockets
  - Bombs: 2 × 250 kg (550 lb) bombs
- (some versions equipped with 3 x NR-23 autocannons and 2 x K-5 air-to-air missiles)

== See also ==
Related development

- Mikoyan-Gurevich MiG-15
- PZL-Mielec Lim-6
- Shenyang J-5

Aircraft of comparable role, configuration, and era

- CAC Sabre
- Dassault Mystère IV
- Fiat G.91
- Hawker Hunter
- North American F-86D Sabre
- Supermarine Swift

Related lists

- List of military aircraft of the Soviet Union and the CIS
- List of fighter aircraft
