= 443d Fighter Squadron =

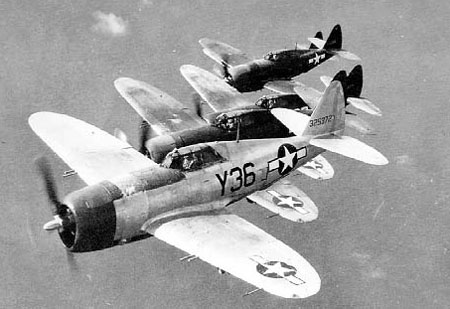
- P-47 Thunderbolts, last plane flown by the squadron (Note: Aircraft are from a training unit.)
- Active: 1943–1944
- Country: United States
- Branch: United States Air Force

Insignia
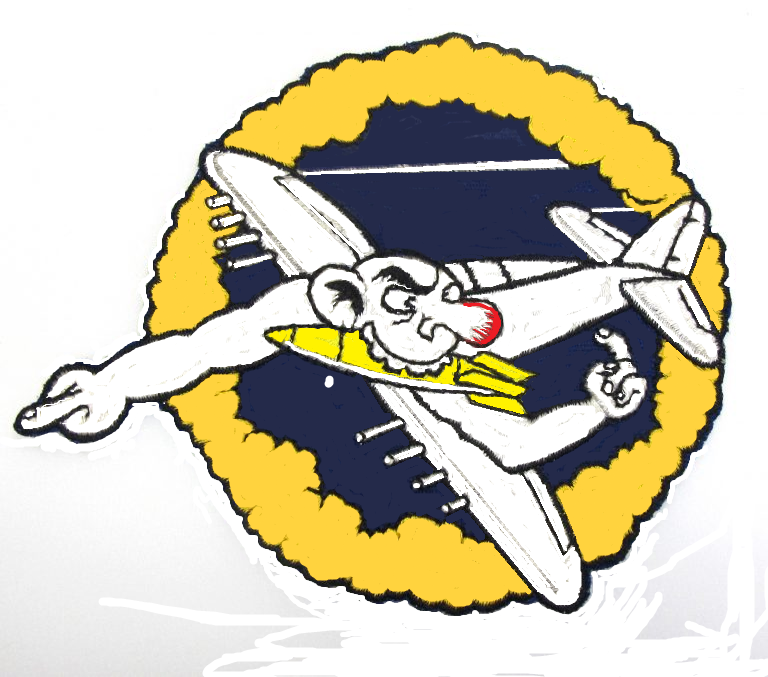
- 443d Fighter Squadron emblem

The 443d Fighter Squadron is a disbanded United States Air Force unit. It was assigned to the 327th Fighter Group, and last stationed at Norfolk Army Air Field, [irginia, where it was disbanded on 10 April 1944. The squadron was active as an operational and replacement training Unit from its activation in February 1943. Until February 1944, it also had a secondary air defense mission.

== History ==
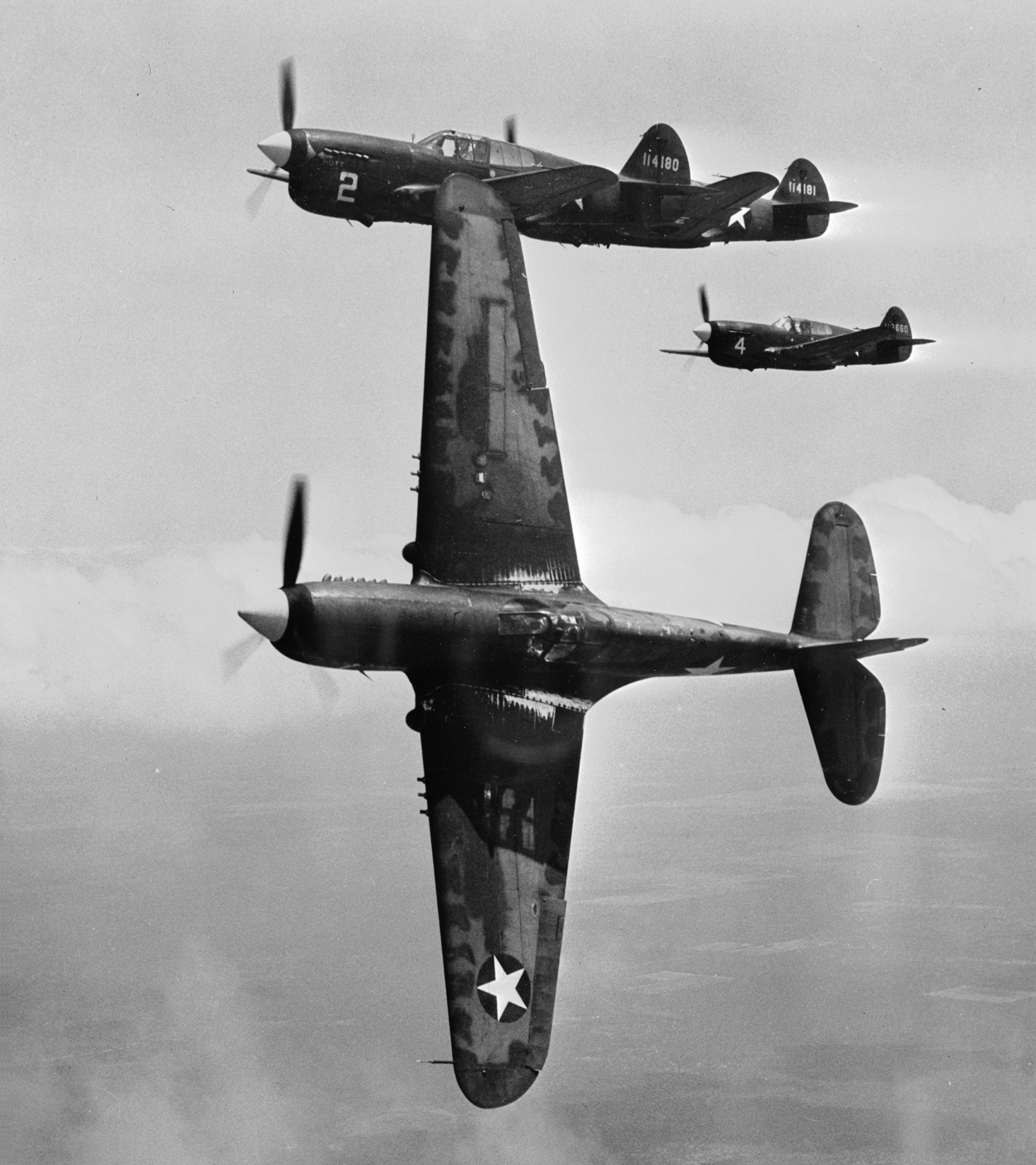
P-40s of a training unit

The 443d Fighter Squadron was activated at Richmond Army Air Base, Virginia, where it was assigned to the 327th Fighter Group, which expanded from three to four squadrons. It initially served as an Operational Training Unit (OTU) for the Curtiss P-40 Warhawk. However, shortly after activation, the squadron converted to the Republic P-47 Thunderbolt. In addition to its training mission, the squadron also served in the air defense of the Mid-Atlantic area. The OTU program involved the use of an oversized parent unit to provide cadres to "satellite" units The OTU program was patterned after the unit training system of the Royal Air Force. The parent unit assumed responsibility for satellite unit training and oversaw its expansion with graduates of Army Air Forces Training Command schools to become effective combat units. Initial training concentrated on individual training in crewmember specialties. Final training concentrated on operation as a unit.

February 1944 saw two changes for the squadron. First, its mission changed to becoming a Replacement Training Unit (RTU). By this time 90% of Army Air Forces units had been activated and almost three quarters of them had deployed overseas. With the exception of special programs, like forming Boeing B-29 Superfortress units, training “fillers” for existing units became more important than unit training. Like OTUs, RTUs were oversized units, but their mission was to train individual pilots for overseas assignment. The 327th Group split its operations, with group headquarters and the 323d and 324th Fighter Squadrons remaining at Richmond, while the 443d and 325th Fighter Squadrons moved to Norfolk Army Air Field, Virginia.

However, The Army Air Forces was finding that standard military units like the 443d, whose manning was based on relatively inflexible tables of organization, were proving not well adapted to the training mission, even more so to the replacement mission. Accordingly, the Army Air Forces adopted a more functional system in which each base was organized into a separate numbered unit. The 443d and other units at Norfolk were disbanded or inactivated and replaced by the 130th AAF Base Unit (Fighter).

== Lineage ==
- Constituted as the 443d Fighter Squadron on 19 February 1943

Activated on 24 February 1943
Disbanded on 10 April 1944

=== Assignments ===
- 327th Fighter Group, 24 February 1943 – 10 April 1944

=== Stations ===
- Richmond Army Air Field, Virginia, 24 February 1943
- Norfolk Army Air Field, Virginia, 16 February – 10 April 1944

=== Aircraft ===
- Curtiss P-40 Warhawk, 1943
- Republic P-47 Thunderbolt, 1943–1944

=== Campaigns ===
| Service Streamer | Campaign | Dates | Notes |
|---|---|---|---|
| | American Theater without inscription | 28 February 1942 – 10 April 1944 | |
