= Defence industry of Australia =

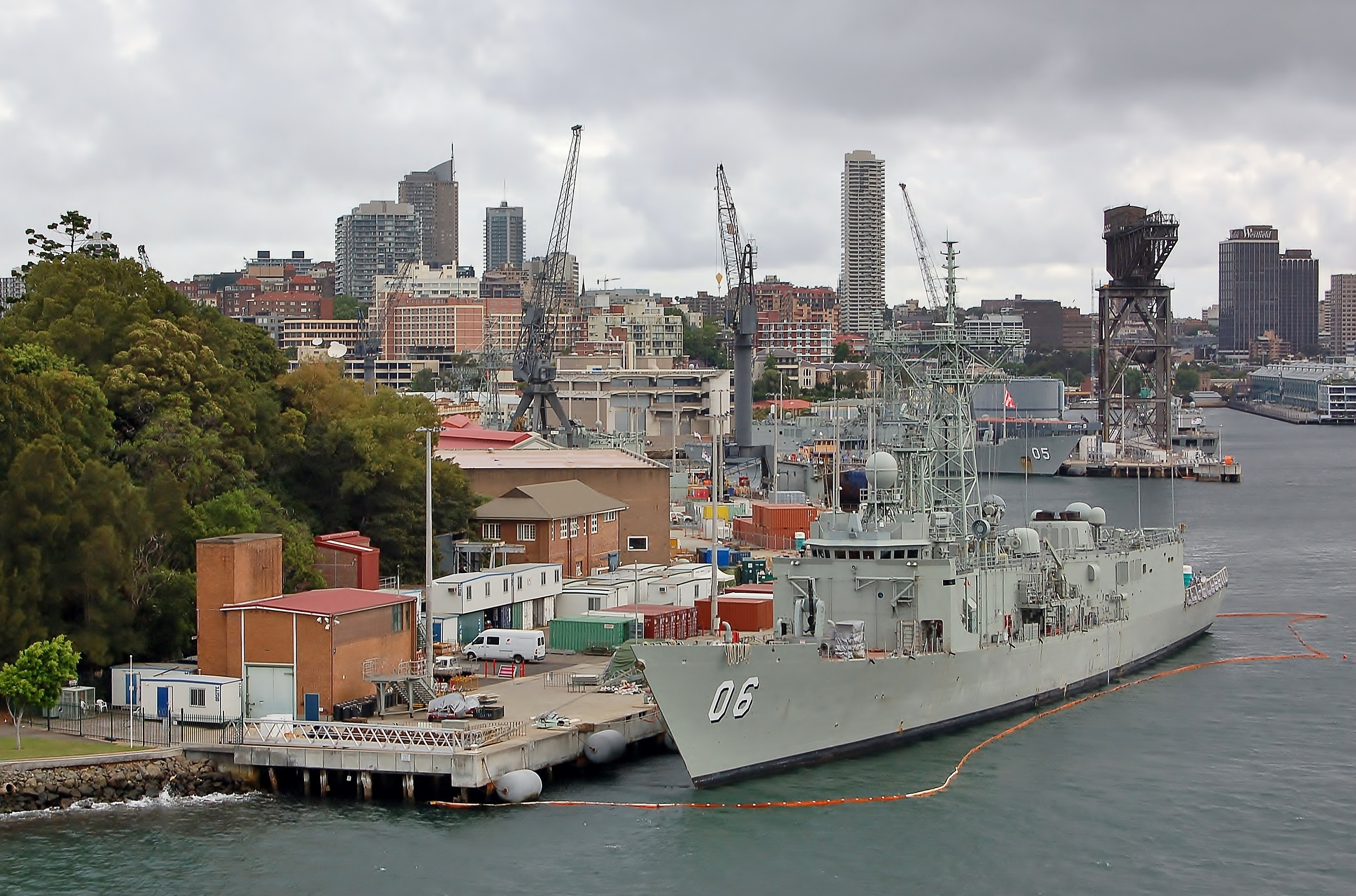
The Australian-built frigate HMAS Newcastle and other warships at Fleet Base East in Sydney, a major centre for the Australian defence industry

The defence industry of Australia provides military equipment, supplies and services for the Australian Defence Force (ADF) and export customers. Definitions of what the defence industry comprises and estimates of its size differ, but it was believed to have employed between 12,000 and 29,000 people as of the mid-2010s. The industry has grown over recent years, and Australian Defence Magazine reported that the 40 largest companies had a total revenue of $A 9.2 billion in 2015.

== History ==
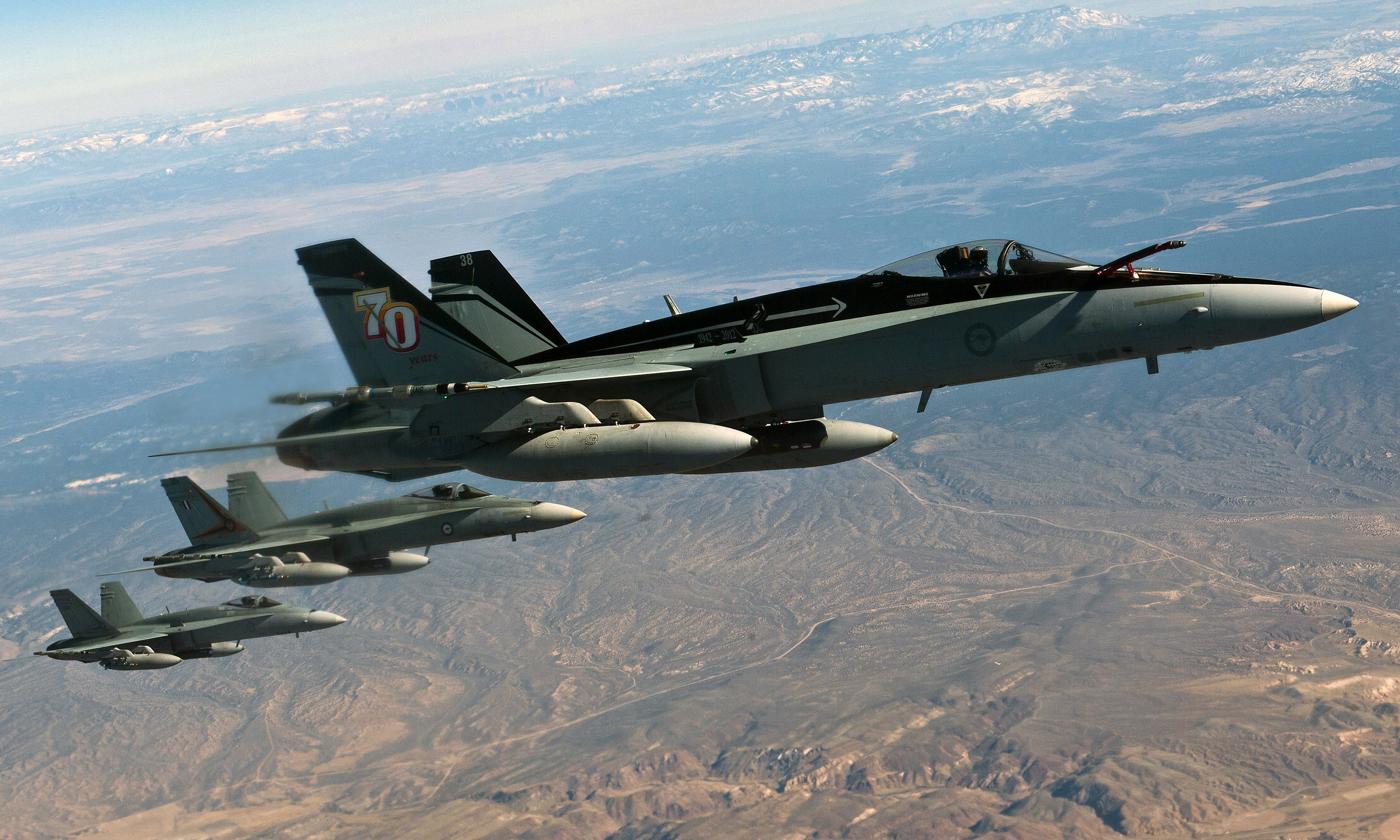
F/A-18A/B Hornets.

The need for a domestic defence industry was established after Australia's participation in the Boer War made apparent the logistical issues of troops arriving with different equipment to that used by the British, causing issue with the supply of ammunition and field repair of weapons. Thus, after the establishment of the Commonwealth in 1901, the Government resolved to make Australia independent of British munitions and armament supplies. In 1907 the decision was made to establish Lithgow Small Arms Factory for the manufacture of small arms in Australia. During World War I, Australia manufactured SMLE III rifles for the Australian army. During World War II, this production was expanded to include 3.7-inch anti-aircraft guns, Vickers guns and Bren guns, among other similar products.

Australia's aircraft industry took off prior to World War II, with the establishment of the Commonwealth Aircraft Corporation in 1937 by Essington Lewis. It was a private company formed by a consortium to manufacture military aircraft with the intention of providing Australia with the tools to fight the modern war that was looming. The CAC manufactured many aircraft, both of domestic designs and under licence, including the Wirraway, the Boomerang, and CAC Wackett. De Havilland Australia, which was founded in 1927, produced for the Royal Australian Air Force beginning in the late 1930s with products including DH.82 Tiger Moths and DH.94 Moth Minors. De Havilland Australia acquired Commonwealth Aircraft Corporation in 1985 and was purchased by Boeing in 2000. Post-war domestic production of American aircraft designs includes the licensed production of the F-86 Sabre between 1954 and 1961 and assembly of F/A-18A/B Hornets from 1985 to 1990.

Shipbuilding in Australia had been present since the 1850s. Commissioned in 1855, HMCS Spitfire was the first warship built in Australia for a Colonial government, although most ships were ordered from shipyards in England. Commissioned in 1911, HMAS Warrego (D70) was the first ship to be built in Australia for the Royal Australian Navy, which was formed earlier that year. During World War II, Australian shipyards were responsible for the construction of 113 ships as well as the repair of 4000 other Australian ships, over 500 U.S. navy ships, and 391 Royal Navy ships. Whilst the government of Australia had always preferred to buy foreign warships, this changed with the 1976 Defence White Paper which emphasised a need for self-reliance.

== Current scale ==
As there is no agreed definition of what the Australian defence industry comprises it is difficult to determine the size of the sector. Many of the companies which supply goods and services to the military also have a significant civilian market, and their staff often work on items intended for both military and civilian customers. The Australian Government's 2018 Defence Export Strategy provided the following definition:

Australian defence industry consists of businesses with an Australian Business Number who are providing or have the capacity to provide defence-specific or dual-use goods or services in a supply chain that leads to the Australian Department of Defence or an international Defence force.

A 2015 parliamentary inquiry into the defence industry noted that "published estimates of the number of people employed in the defence industry have cited varying figures". The federal government body Skills Australia estimated in 2012 that between 15,000 and 25,000 were employed in the industry. In 2010 the Department of Defence put the figure at up to 29,000 people, and in 2015 it advised the inquiry that around 27,000 people were directly employed in the industry. The 2016 Defence Industry Policy Statement stated that 25,000 people were employed in the defence industry, of whom around 50 percent worked in global defence companies. If accurate, this estimate means that the industry represents 0.24% of total employment, and is equivalent to 2.9% of jobs in the total manufacturing sector.

In January 2016 Australian Defence Magazine reported that the 40 largest Australian defence companies had a combined revenue of $A 9.2 billion in 2015. A 2017 Australian Strategic Policy Institute report stated that the defence industry "accounts for 0.22% of Australian industry and 1.7% of the manufacturing sector", and "although [the] Australian defence industry is undoubtedly important for our defence force, it represents only a trifling fraction of the overall Australian economy.

== Exports and imports ==
The scale of the Australian defence industry's exports is greatly outweighed by the scale of imports of military goods and services into Australia. Between 2001 and 2016, the total value of defence exports from Australia measured using the Stockholm International Peace Research Institute's methodology represented 6.8 percent of the total value of defence imports into Australia. There was considerable variation in this ratio between years. As of 2018, the total value of Australian defence exports was around $A2 billion per year. While this made Australia the 20th largest exporter of defence goods and services, it represented only around half of one percent of the global arms trade.

A 2010 Australian Strategic Policy Institute report stated that "Defence’s principal needs from Australian industry are maintenance, repair and upgrading of the ADF’s equipment, most of which is imported". This report also noted that at the time it was estimated that manufacturing represented 20 percent of the Australian defence industry's revenue, with sustainment services making up the remainder.

In 2018 the Australian Government announced a plan to support the Australian defence industry to expand its exports, with the goal of Australia becoming the 10th largest source of military exports. This will include making $A3.8 billion in government funding available for loans to companies and establishing an Australian Defence Export Advocate.

== Defence industry media ==
Several trade journals currently cover the Australian defence industry. These include the Australian Defence Magazine and the Asia-Pacific Defence Reporter.

== See also ==
- Minister for Defence Industry
- Capability Acquisition and Sustainment Group
- Defence industry of Victoria
- Australian Industry and Defence Network, the peak defence industry body for small to medium enterprises in Australia.

== Sources ==
- Department of Defence (2016). 2016 Defence Industry Policy Statement (PDF). Canberra: Department of Defence. ISBN 9780994168078.
- Department of Defence (2018). Defence Export Strategy. Canberra: Department of Defence. ISBN 9780648097716.
- Ferguson, Gregor (22 December 2010). Risks and rewards: Defence R&D in Australia. Canberra: Australian Strategic Policy Institute.
- Joint Standing Committee on Foreign Affairs, Defence and Trade (2015). Principles and Practice - Australian Defence Industry and Exports. Canberra: Parliament of Australia. ISBN 978-1-74366-316-5.
- Thomson, Mark (2017). "The Cost of Defence: ASPI Defence Budget Brief 2017-2018". Canberra: Australian Strategic Policy Institute. ISSN 2200-6613.
