= Direct voice input =

Style of human–machine interaction

Direct voice input (DVI), sometimes called voice input control (VIC), is a style of human–machine interaction "HMI" in which the user makes voice commands to issue instructions to the machine through speech recognition.

In the field of military aviation, DVI has been introduced into the cockpits of several modern military aircraft, such as the Eurofighter Typhoon, the Lockheed Martin F-35 Lightning II, the Dassault Rafale, the KF-21 Boramae and the Saab JAS 39 Gripen. Such systems have also been used for various other purposes, including industry control systems and speech recognition assistance for impaired individuals.

== Overview ==
DVI systems can be divided into two major categories of functionality: "user-dependent" or "user-independent". A user-dependent system requires that a personal voice template be generated for a specific person; the template for this individual has to be loaded onto their assigned machine prior to use of the DVI system for it to function properly. In contrast, a user-independent system does not require any personal voice template, being intended to respond correctly to the voice of any user. They can also be categorised between "discrete recognition" and "continuous recognition". Users of a discrete recognition system must pause between each word so that the DVI system can identify the separations between each word, while a continuous speech recognition system is capable of understanding a normal rate of speech.

During the mid-2000s, researchers at the National Aerospace Laboratory in the Netherlands examined the use of DVI in the "GRACE" simulator; a total of twelve pilots participated in the ensuing experiment. The tests performed reportedly revealed that, while the hardware itself functioned well, several improvements were desirable prior to real-world deployment on aircraft since DVI operations actually consumed more time in comparison to traditional existing methods. Recommendations for improvements included the adoption of simpler syntax, the achievement of a greater recognition rate, and a decrease in response times; all of the issues encountered were determined to be of a technological nature, and were deemed feasible to resolve. The researchers concluded that in cockpits, especially during emergencies where pilots have to operate entirely on their own, a DVI system could be highly relevant, but that it was not of crucial importance during most other conceivable scenarios.

Around the same time, evaluations of DVI systems for civil aviation purposes were conducted within the framework of Project SafeSound, coordinated by the European Union. It involved the observation of pilot workloads in real-world cockpits and contrasting them against pilot activity in flight simulators using both conventional systems and DVI assistance. The project aimed to enhance aviation safety and to decrease the workload in both ground and flight operations via the application of enhanced audio functions.

== Applications ==
=== Aviation ===
Prior to its widespread deployment, a handful of conventional military aircraft were converted to trial DVI systems; examples include the Harrier AV-8B and F-16 VISTA. In another case, a General Dynamics F-16 Fighting Falcon simulator was modified with DVI for a voice control study that was undertaken by the Royal Netherlands Air Force. DVI trials have also been conducted on helicopters, including the Boeing AH-64 Apache, showing the potential to improve flight safety and mission effectiveness.

Numerous modern fighter aircraft have been outfitted with DVI systems, often in combination with various other man-machine interface schemes, such as HOTAS-compliant controls and other advanced control technologies. The combination of Voice and HOTAS control schemes has sometimes been referred to as the "V-TAS" concept. A prominent fighter aircraft to be furnished with a V-TAS cockpit is the Eurofighter Typhoon. The Lockheed Martin F-35 Lightning II also features a DVI system, which was developed by Adacel. Other examples includes the Dassault Rafale and the Saab JAS 39 Gripen.

Numerous aircraft have been planned to use DVI. At one stage, the United States Air Force had sought to integrate DVI upon the Lockheed Martin F-22 Raptor; however, the technology was eventually judged to pose too many technical risks at that point in time, and thus such efforts were abandoned.

=== Personal ===
By 1990, working prototypes of speech recognition systems were being demonstrated; these were being promoted for the purpose of providing an effective man-machine interface for individuals with impaired speech. Techniques employed included time-encoded digital speech and automatic token set selection. Investigations of these early DVI systems reportedly included the use of automatic diagnostic routines and limited-scale trials using volunteers.

During the 2010s, various companies were offering voice recognition systems to the general public in the form of personal digital assistants. One example is the Google Voice service, which allows users to pose questions via a DVI package installed on either a personal computer, tablet, or mobile phone. Numerous digital assistants have been developed, such as Amazon Echo, Siri, and Cortana, that use DVI to interact with users.

=== Commercial ===
DVI technology has enabled automated telephone systems to be widely deployed. Many companies commonly use centralised phone systems that route callers to the correct department via such methods. Various car manufacturers have also furnished their road vehicles with DVI systems; these typically allow drivers to control infotainment systems and interact with mobile phones with more convenience than legacy methods.

During the late 1980s, investigations into the use of DVI systems for controlling CNC machines and other manufacturing apparatus were underway. During the 2010s, such systems were being used for logistics and warehouse management purposes.
