= McDonnell Douglas AV-8B Harrier II =

Anglo-American VSTOL ground-attack aircraft

AV-8B Harrier II
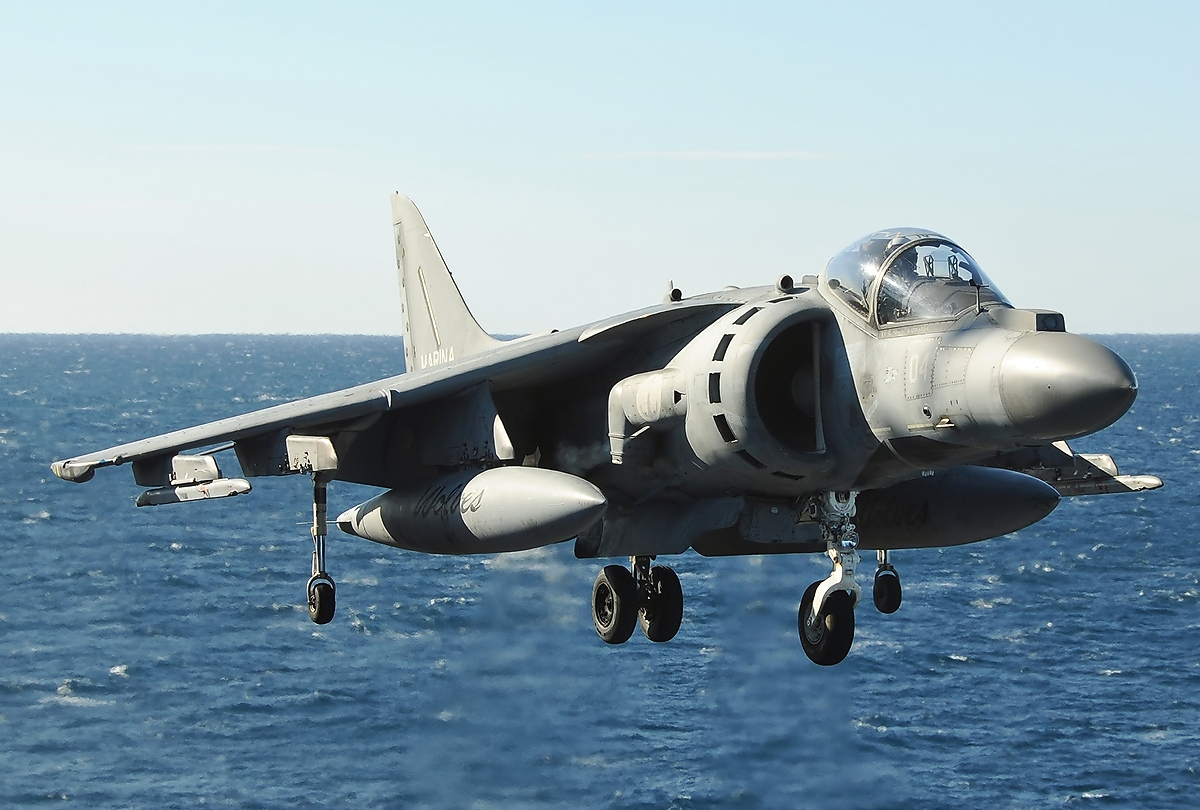
- An Italian AV-8B Plus hovering

General information
- Type: V/STOL ground-attack aircraft
- National origin: United Kingdom / United States
- Manufacturer: McDonnell Douglas / British Aerospace; Boeing / BAE Systems
- Status: In limited service
- Primary users: United States Marine Corps (former) Italian Navy; Spanish Navy
- Number built: AV-8B: 337 (excluding the YAV-8B) (Note: According to Lon Nordeen, 507 Harrier IIs had been completed, including 96 British Aerospace Harrier IIs and 74 remanufactured USMC Harrier IIs, meaning 337 new-built AV-8Bs were manufactured. Two YAV-8B prototypes were also converted from AV-8As. Quote from St. Louis Post-Dispatch (2003): "Boeing and its predecessor in St. Louis, McDonnell Douglas Corp., have been building or modifying a second-generation Harrier—known as the Harrier II or AV-8B—since 1981. Collectively, they've produced about 340 of the aircraft.")

History
- Manufactured: 1981–2003
- Introduction date: January 1985
- First flight: YAV-8B: 9 November 1978; AV-8B: 5 November 1981
- Retired: 3 June 2026 (USMC)
- Developed from: Hawker Siddeley Harrier
- Variant: British Aerospace Harrier II

The McDonnell Douglas (now Boeing) AV-8B Harrier II is a single-engine ground-attack aircraft that constitutes the second generation of the Harrier family, capable of vertical or short takeoff and landing (V/STOL). The aircraft is primarily employed on light attack or multi-role missions, ranging from close air support of ground troops to armed reconnaissance. The AV-8B has served with the United States Marine Corps (USMC), the Spanish Navy, and the Italian Navy. A variant of the AV-8B, the British Aerospace Harrier II, was developed for the British armed forces, while another, the TAV-8B, is a dedicated two-seat trainer.

The project that eventually led to the AV-8B's creation started in the early 1970s as a cooperative effort between the United States and United Kingdom, aimed at addressing the operational shortcomings of the first-generation Hawker Siddeley Harrier. Early efforts centered on a larger, more powerful Pegasus engine to dramatically improve the capabilities of the Harrier. Because of budgetary constraints, the UK abandoned the project in 1975. Following the UK's withdrawal, McDonnell Douglas extensively redesigned the earlier AV-8A Harrier to create the AV-8B. While retaining the general layout of its predecessor, the aircraft incorporates a new, larger composite wing with an additional hardpoint on each side, an elevated cockpit, a redesigned fuselage and other structural and aerodynamic refinements. The aircraft is powered by an upgraded version of the Pegasus. The AV-8B made its maiden flight in November 1981 and entered service with the USMC in January 1985. Later upgrades added a night-attack capability and radar, resulting in the AV-8B(NA) and AV-8B Harrier II Plus versions, respectively. An enlarged version named Harrier III was also studied but not pursued. The UK, through British Aerospace, re-joined the improved Harrier project as a partner in 1981, giving it a significant work-share in the project. Following corporate mergers in the 1990s, Boeing and BAE Systems have jointly supported the program. Approximately 340 aircraft were produced in a 22-year production program that ended in 2003.

Typically operated from small aircraft carriers, large amphibious assault ships and simple forward operating bases, AV-8Bs have participated in numerous military and humanitarian operations, proving themselves versatile assets. U.S. Army General Norman Schwarzkopf named the USMC Harrier II as one of several important weapons in the Gulf War. It also served in Operation Enduring Freedom in Afghanistan, the Iraq War and subsequent War in Iraq, along with Operation Odyssey Dawn in Libya in 2011. Italian and Spanish Harrier IIs have taken part in overseas conflicts in conjunction with NATO coalitions. During its service history, the AV-8B has had a high accident rate, related to the percentage of time spent in critical take-off and landing phases. USMC and Italian Navy AV-8Bs are being replaced by the Lockheed Martin F-35B Lightning II, with the USMC retiring its Harriers in June 2026.

== Development ==
=== Origins ===
In the late 1960s and early 1970s, the first-generation Harriers entered service with the Royal Air Force (RAF) and USMC but were limited in range and payload. In short takeoff and landing configuration, the AV-8A (American designation for the Harrier) carried less than half of the smaller A-4 Skyhawk's payload (4,000 pounds or 1,800 kilograms), over a more limited radius. To address this, Hawker Siddeley and McDonnell Douglas began joint development of a more capable version of the Harrier in 1973. Early efforts concentrated on an improved Pegasus engine, designated the Pegasus 15, which was being tested by Bristol Siddeley. Although more powerful, the engine's diameter was too large by 2.75 in (70 mm) to fit into the Harrier easily.

In December 1973, a joint American and British team completed a project document defining an advanced Harrier powered by the Pegasus 15 engine. The advanced Harrier was intended to replace the original RAF and USMC Harriers, as well as the USMC's A-4 Skyhawk. The aim of the advanced Harrier was to double the AV-8's payload and range and was therefore unofficially named AV-16. The British government pulled out of the project in March 1975 owing to decreased defense funding, rising costs, and the RAF's insufficient 60-aircraft requirement. With development costs estimated to be around £180–200 million (1974 British pounds), the United States was unwilling to fund development by itself and ended the project later that year.

Despite the project's termination, the two companies continued to take different paths toward an enhanced Harrier. Hawker Siddeley focused on a new larger wing that could be retrofitted to existing operational aircraft, while McDonnell Douglas independently pursued a less ambitious, though still expensive, project catering to the needs of the U.S. military. Using knowledge gleaned from the AV-16 effort, though dropping some items—such as the larger Pegasus engine—McDonnell Douglas kept the basic structure and engine for an aircraft tailored for the USMC.

=== Designing and testing ===
As the USMC wanted a substantially improved Harrier without the development of a new engine, the plan for Harrier II development was authorized by the United States Department of Defense (DoD) in 1976. The United States Navy (USN), which had traditionally procured military aircraft for the USMC, insisted that the new design be verified with flight testing. McDonnell Douglas modified two AV-8As with new wings, revised intakes, redesigned thrust nozzles, and other aerodynamic changes; the modified forward fuselage and cockpit found on all subsequent aircraft were not incorporated on these prototypes. Designated YAV-8B, the first converted aircraft flew on 9 November 1978. The aircraft performed three vertical take-offs and hovered for seven minutes at Lambert–St. Louis International Airport. The second aircraft followed on 19 February 1979 but crashed that November because of an engine flameout; the pilot ejected safely. Flight testing of these modified AV-8s continued into 1979. The results showed greater than expected drag, hampering the aircraft's maximum speed. Further refinements to the aerodynamic profile yielded little improvement. Positive test results in other areas, including payload, range, and V/STOL performance, led to the award of a development contract in 1979. The contract stipulated a procurement of 12 aircraft initially, followed by a further 324.

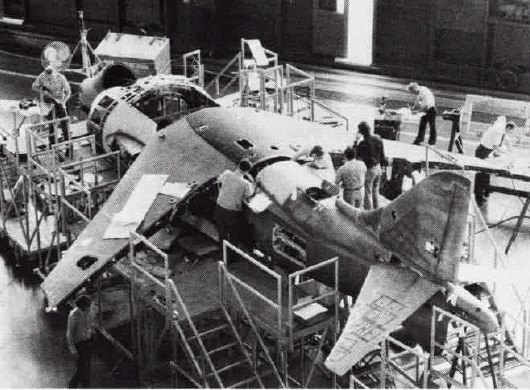
A YAV-8B undergoes conversion from an AV-8A, and as such does not feature the raised cockpit found on AV-8Bs.

Between 1978 and 1980, the DoD and USN repeatedly attempted to terminate the AV-8B program. There had previously been conflict between the USMC and USN over budgetary issues. At the time, the USN wanted to procure A-18s for its ground attack force and, to cut costs, pressured the USMC to adopt the similarly designed F-18 fighter instead of the AV-8B to fulfill the role of close air support (both designs were eventually amalgamated to create the multirole F/A-18 Hornet). Despite these bureaucratic obstacles, in 1981 the DoD included the Harrier II in its annual budget and five-year defense plan. The USN declined to participate in the procurement, citing the limited range and payload compared with conventional aircraft.

In August 1981, the program received a boost when British Aerospace (BAe) and McDonnell Douglas signed a memorandum of understanding, marking the UK's re-entry into the program. The British government was enticed by the lower cost of acquiring Harriers promised by a large production run, and the fact that the U.S. was shouldering the expense of development. Under the agreement, BAe was relegated to the position of a subcontractor, instead of the full partner status that would have been the case had the UK not left the program. Consequently, the company received, in man-hours, 40% of the airframe work-share. Aircraft production took place at McDonnell Douglas' facilities in suburban St. Louis, Missouri, and manufacturing by BAe at its Kingston and Dunsfold facilities in Surrey, England. Meanwhile, 75% work-share for the engine went to Rolls-Royce, which had absorbed Bristol Siddeley, with the remaining 25% assigned to Pratt & Whitney. The two companies planned to manufacture 400 Harrier IIs, with the USMC expected to procure 336 aircraft and the RAF to procure 60.

Four full-scale development (FSD) aircraft were constructed. The first of these, used mainly for testing performance and handling qualities, made its maiden flight on 5 November 1981. The second and third FSD aircraft, which introduced wing leading-edge root extensions and revised engine intakes, first flew in April the following year; the fourth followed in January 1984. The first production AV-8B was delivered to the Marine Attack Training Squadron 203 (VMAT-203) at Marine Corps Air Station Cherry Point on 12 December 1983, and officially handed over one month later. The last of the initial batch of 12 was delivered in January 1985 to the front-line Marine Attack Squadron 331. These aircraft had F402-RR-404A engines, with 21,450 lb (95.4 kN) of thrust; aircraft from 1990 onwards received upgraded engines.

=== Upgrades ===
A USMC AV-8B Harrier II demonstrating its hover capabilities

During the initial pilot conversion course, it became apparent that the AV-8B exhibited flight characteristics different from the AV-8A. These differences, as well as the digital cockpit fitted instead of the analog cockpit of the TAV-8A, necessitated additional pilot training. In 1984, funding for eight AV-8Bs was diverted to the development of a two-seat TAV-8B trainer. The first of the 28 TAV-8Bs eventually procured had its maiden flight on 21 October 1986. (Note: According to Lon Nordeen, the first TAV-8B flew on 21 November 1986.) This aircraft was delivered to VMAT-203 on 24 July 1987; the TAV-8B was also ordered by Italy and Spain.

With export interest from Brazil, Japan, and Italy serving as a source of encouragement to continue development of the Harrier II, McDonnell Douglas commenced work on a night-attack variant in 1985. With the addition of an infrared sensor and cockpit interface enhancements, the 87th production single-seat AV-8B became the first Harrier II to be modified for night attacks, leaving the McDonnell Douglas production line in June 1987. Flight tests proved successful and the night attack capability was validated. The first of 66 AV-8B(NA)s was delivered to the USMC in September 1989. An equivalent version of the AV-8B(NA) also served with the RAF under the designation GR7; earlier GR5 aircraft were subsequently upgraded to GR7 standards.

In June 1987, as a private venture, BAe, McDonnell Douglas, and Smiths Industries agreed on the development of what was to become the AV-8B Plus with the addition of radar and increased missile compatibility. The agreement was endorsed by the USMC and, after much consideration, the Spanish and Italian navies developed a joint requirement for a fleet of air-defense Harriers. The United States, Spain, and Italy signed an MoU in September 1990 to define the responsibilities of the three countries and establish a Joint Program Office to manage the program. On 30 November 1990, the USN, acting as an agent for the three participating countries, awarded McDonnell Douglas the contract to develop the improved Harrier. The award was followed by an order from the USMC in December 1990 for 30 new aircraft, and 72 rebuilt from older aircraft. Italy ordered 16 Harrier II Plus and two twin-seat TAV-8B aircraft, while Spain signed a contract for eight aircraft. Production of the AV-8B Harrier II Plus was conducted, in addition to McDonnell Douglas' plant, at CASA's facility in Seville, Spain, and Alenia Aeronautica's facility in Turin, Italy. The UK also participated in the program by manufacturing components for the AV-8B.

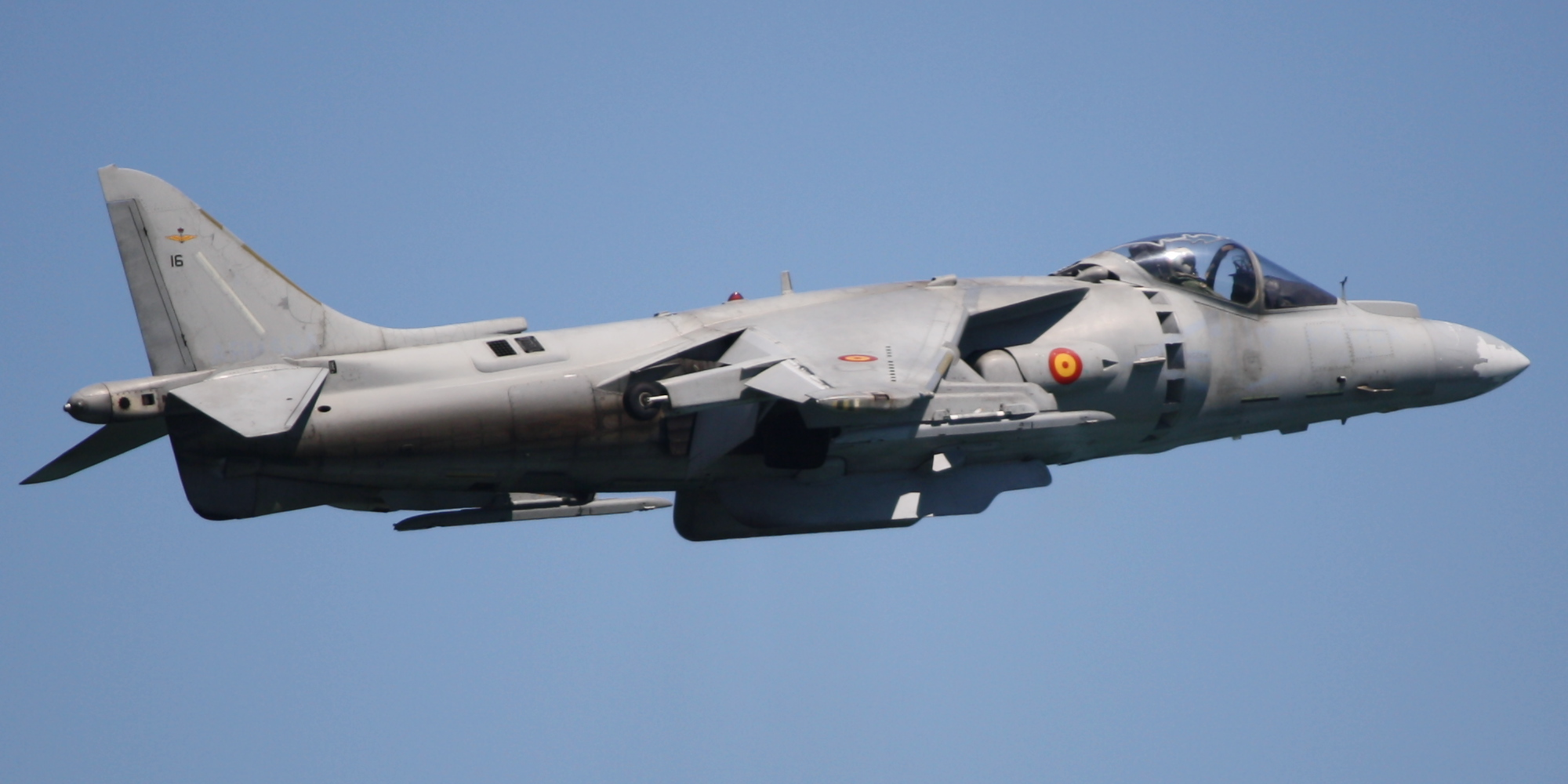
A Spanish Navy AV-8B Plus in-flight. The nose houses the Hughes APG-65 pulse-Doppler radar.

Production was authorized on 3 June 1992. The maiden flight of the prototype took place on 22 September, marking the start of a successful flight-test program. The first production aircraft made its initial flight on 17 March 1993. Deliveries of new aircraft took place from April 1993 to 1995. At the same time, the plan to remanufacture existing AV-8Bs to the Plus standard proceeded. On 11 March 1994, the Defense Acquisition Board approved the program, which initially involved 70 aircraft, with four converted in fiscal year 1994. The program planned to use new and refurbished components to rebuild aircraft at a lower cost than manufacturing new ones. Conversion began in April 1994, and the first aircraft was delivered to the USMC in January 1996.

=== End of production and further improvements ===
In March 1996, the U.S. General Accounting Office (GAO) stated that it was less expensive to buy Harrier II Plus aircraft outright than to remanufacture existing AV-8Bs. The USN estimated the cost for remanufacture of each aircraft to be US$23–30 million, instead of $30 million for each new-built aircraft, while the GAO estimated the cost per new aircraft at $24 million. Nevertheless, the program continued and, in 2003, the 72nd and last AV-8B to be remanufactured for the USMC was delivered. (Note: Quote from Nordeen 2006: "The Marine Corps supported this concept as an economical way to upgrade their Harrier II V/STOL force and achieve operational requirement for 72-radar equipped AV-8Bs. Deliveries of remanufactured Harrier II Plus aircraft continued from 1996 to 2003." Part 1 of Appendix B claims that 74 AV-8Bs have been remanufactured for the USMC.) Spain also participated in the program, the delivery of its last refurbished aircraft occurring in December 2003, which marked the end of the AV-8B's production; the final new AV-8B had been delivered in 1997.

In the 1990s, Boeing and BAE Systems assumed management of the Harrier family following corporate mergers that saw Boeing acquire McDonnell Douglas and BAe acquire Marconi Electronic Systems to form BAE Systems. Between 1969 and 2003, 824 Harriers of all models were delivered. In 2001, Flight International reported that Taiwan might meet its requirement for a V/STOL aircraft by purchasing AV-8Bs outfitted with the F-16 Fighting Falcon's APG-66 radar. A Taiwanese purchase would have allowed the production line to stay open beyond 2005. Despite the possibility of leasing AV-8Bs, interest in the aircraft waned as the country switched its intentions to procuring the F-35 and upgrading its fleet of F-16s.

Although there have been no new AV-8B variants, in 1990 McDonnell Douglas and British Aerospace began discussions on an interim aircraft between the AV-8B and the next generation of advanced V/STOL aircraft. The Harrier III would have presented an "evolutionary approach to get the most from the existing aircraft", as many of the structures employed on the Sea Harrier and AV-8B would be used. The wing and the torsion box were to be enlarged to accommodate extra fuel and hardpoints to improve the aircraft's endurance. Because of the increase in size, the wing would have had folding wingtips. To meet the heavier weight of the aircraft, Rolls-Royce was expected to design a Pegasus engine variant that would have produced 4,000 pounds (18 kN) more thrust than the latest production variant at the time. The Harrier III would have carried weapons such as AIM-120 AMRAAM and AIM-132 ASRAAM missiles. Boeing and BAE Systems continued studying the design until the early 2000s, when the project was abandoned.

In 2013, the USMC was studying potential enhancements to keep the AV-8B Harrier IIs up to date until its planned retirement, such as a helmet-mounted cueing system. It was also predicted that additional work on the aircraft's radars and sensor systems might take place. The USMC's Harrier II fleet was planned to remain in service until 2030, owing to delays with the F-35B and the fact that the Harriers had more service life left than USMC F/A-18 Hornets. However, by 2014 the USMC had decided to retire the AV-8B sooner because changing the transition orders of Harrier II and Hornet fleets to the Lightning II would save US $1 billion (~$1.34 billion in 2025). The F-35B began replacing the AV-8B in 2016, with the AV-8B then expected to continue service until 2025. Meanwhile, the AV-8B was to receive revamped defensive measures, updated data-link capability and targeting sensors, and improved missiles and rockets, among other enhancements.

== Design ==
=== Overview ===
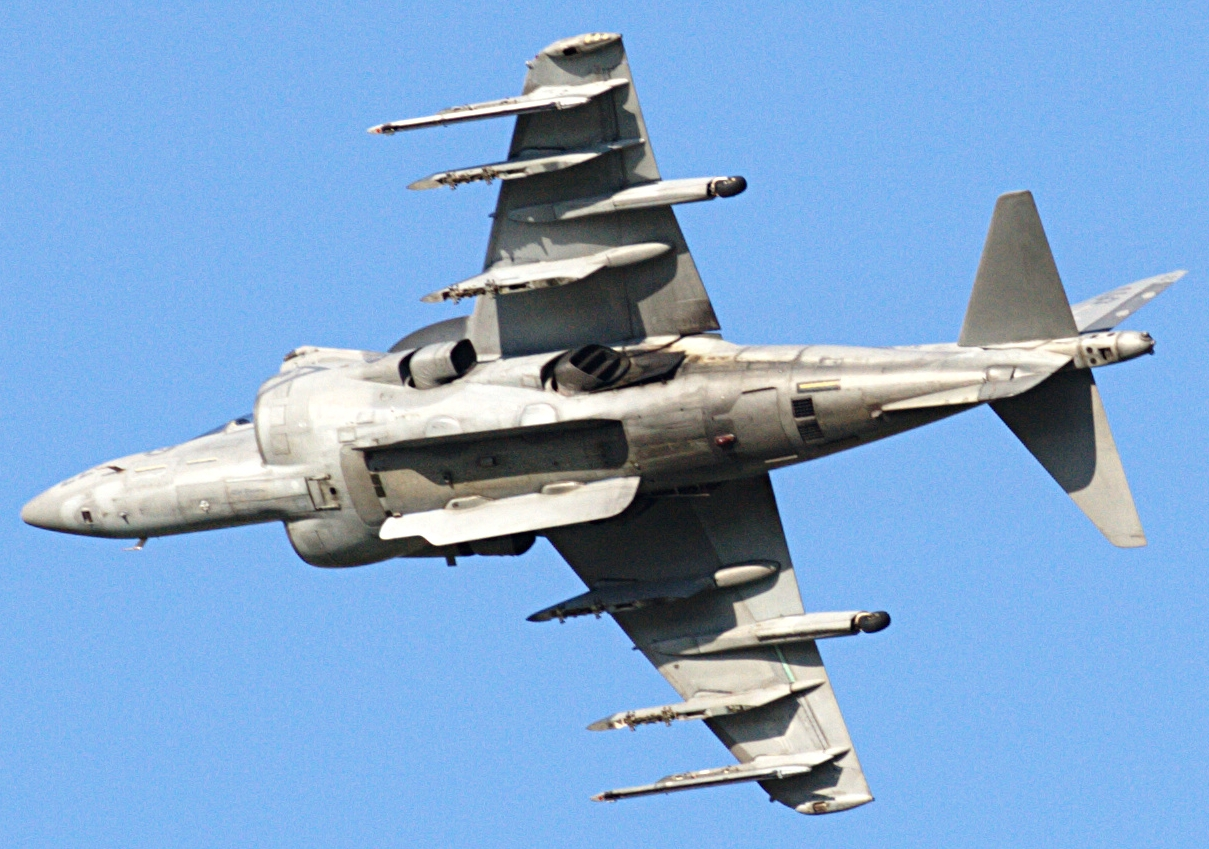
Underside of an AV-8B Harrier II

The AV-8B Harrier II is a subsonic attack aircraft of metal and composite construction that retains the basic layout of the Hawker Siddeley Harrier, with horizontal stabilizers and shoulder-mounted wings featuring prominent anhedral (downward slope). The aircraft is powered by a single Rolls-Royce Pegasus turbofan engine, which has two intakes and four synchronized vectorable nozzles close to its turbine. Two of these nozzles are located near the forward, cold end of the engine and two are near the rear, hot end of the engine. This arrangement contrasts with most fixed-wing aircraft, which have engine nozzles only at the rear. The Harrier II also has smaller valve-controlled nozzles in the nose, tail, and wingtips to provide control at low airspeeds.

The AV-8B is equipped with one centerline fuselage and six wing hardpoints (compared to four wing hardpoints on the original Harrier), along with two fuselage stations for a 25 mm GAU-12 cannon and ammunition pack. These hardpoints give it the ability to carry a total of 9,200 lb (4,200 kg) of weapons, including air-to-air, air-to-surface, and anti-ship missiles, as well as unguided and guided bombs. The aircraft's internal fuel capacity is 7,500 lb (3,400 kg), up 50% compared to its predecessor. Fuel capacity can be carried in hardpoint-compatible external drop tanks, which give the aircraft a maximum ferry range of 2,100 mi (3,300 km) and a combat radius of 300 mi (556 km). The AV-8B can also receive additional fuel via aerial refueling using the probe-and-drogue system. The British Aerospace Harrier II, a variant tailored to the RAF, uses different avionics and has one additional missile pylon on each wing.

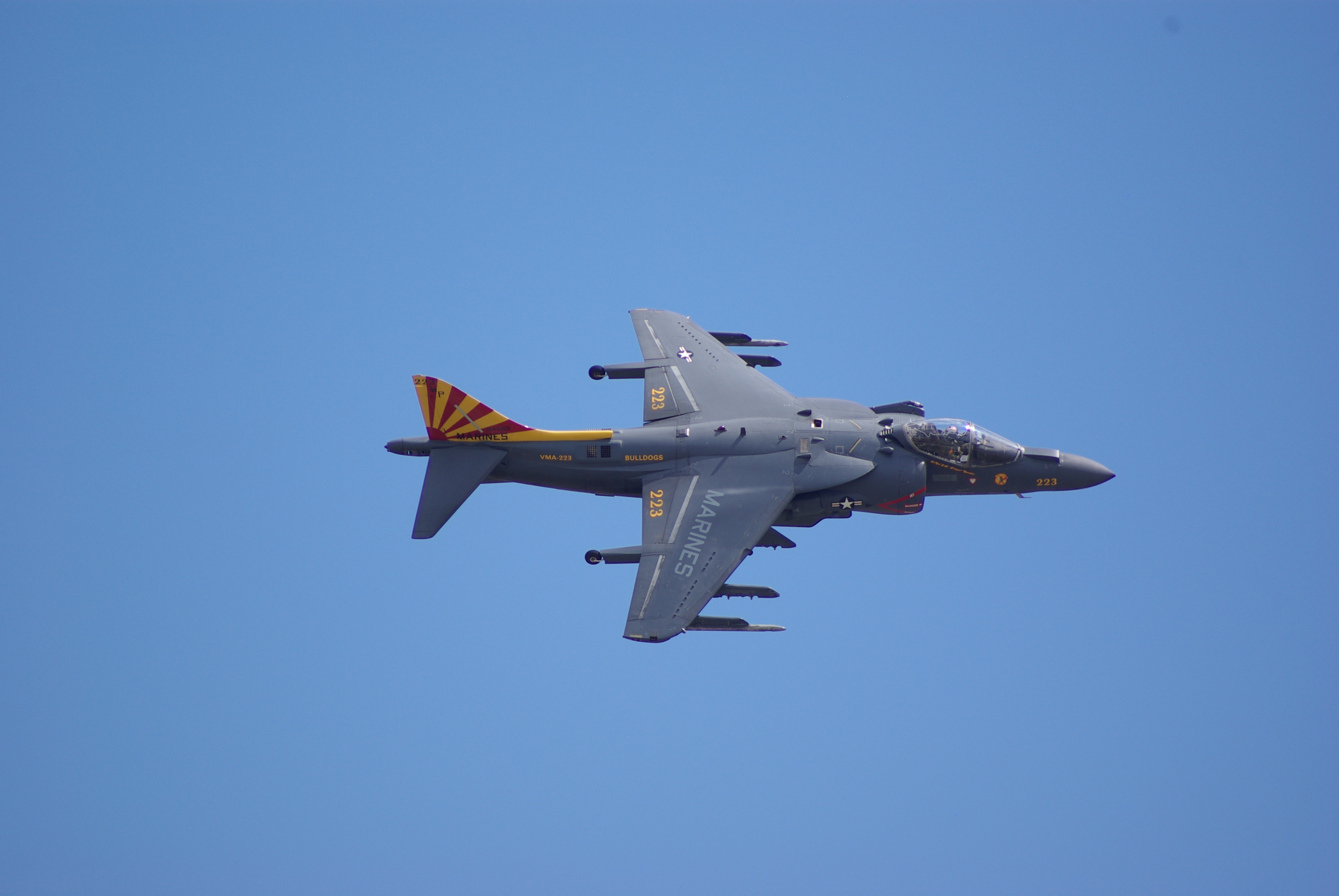
A dorsal view of AV-8B II Plus at MCAS Cherry Point Airshow, 2026

The Harrier II retains the tandem landing gear layout of the first-generation Harriers, although each outrigger landing gear leg was moved from the wingtip to mid-span for a tighter turning radius when taxiing. The engine intakes are larger than those of the first-generation Harrier and have a revised inlet. On the underside of the fuselage, McDonnell Douglas added lift-improvement devices, which capture the reflected engine exhaust when close to the ground, giving the equivalent of up to 1,200 lb (544 kg) of extra lift.

The technological advances incorporated into the Harrier II, compared with the original Harrier, significantly reduce the workload on the pilot. The supercritical wing, hands-on-throttle-and-stick (HOTAS) control principle, and increased engineered lateral stability make the aircraft fundamentally easier to fly. Ed Harper, general manager for the McDonnell Douglas Harrier II development program, summarizes: "The AV-8B looks a lot like the original Harrier and it uses the same operating fundamentals. It just uses them a lot better". A large cathode-ray tube multi-purpose display, taken from the F/A-18, makes up much of the instrument panel in the cockpit. It has a wide range of functions, including radar warning information and weapon delivery checklist. The pilots sit on UPC/Stencel 10B zero-zero ejection seats, meaning that they are able to eject from a stationary aircraft at zero altitude.

=== Airframe ===
For the AV-8B, McDonnell Douglas redesigned the entire airframe of the Harrier, incorporating numerous structural and aerodynamic changes. To improve visibility and better accommodate the crew and avionics hardware, McDonnell Douglas elevated the cockpit by 10.5 in (27 cm) and redesigned the canopy. This improved the forward (17° down), side (60°), and rear visibility. The front fuselage is composed of a molded skin with an epoxy-based core sandwiched between two carbon-fiber sheets. To compensate for the changes in the front fuselage, the rear fuselage was extended by 18 in (46 cm), and the taller vertical stabilizer of the Sea Harrier was used. The tail assembly is made up of composites to reduce weight.

Perhaps the most thorough redesign was of the wing, the objective being to match the performance of the canceled AV-16 while retaining the Pegasus engine of the AV-8A. Engineers designed a new, one-piece supercritical wing, which improves cruise performance by delaying the rise in drag and increasing lift-to-drag ratio. Made of composites, the wing is thicker and has a longer span than that of the AV-8A. Compared to the AV-8A's wing, it has a higher aspect ratio, reduced sweep (from 40° to 37°), and an area increased from 200 sq ft (18.6 m^{2}) to 230 sq ft (21.4 m^{2}). The wing has a high-lift configuration, employing flaps that deploy automatically when maneuvering, and drooped ailerons. Using the leading edge root extensions, the wing allows for a 6,700 lb (3,035 kg) increase in payload compared with the first-generation Harriers after a 1,000 ft (300 m) takeoff roll. Because the wing is almost exclusively composite, it is 330 lb (150 kg) lighter than the AV-8A's smaller wing.

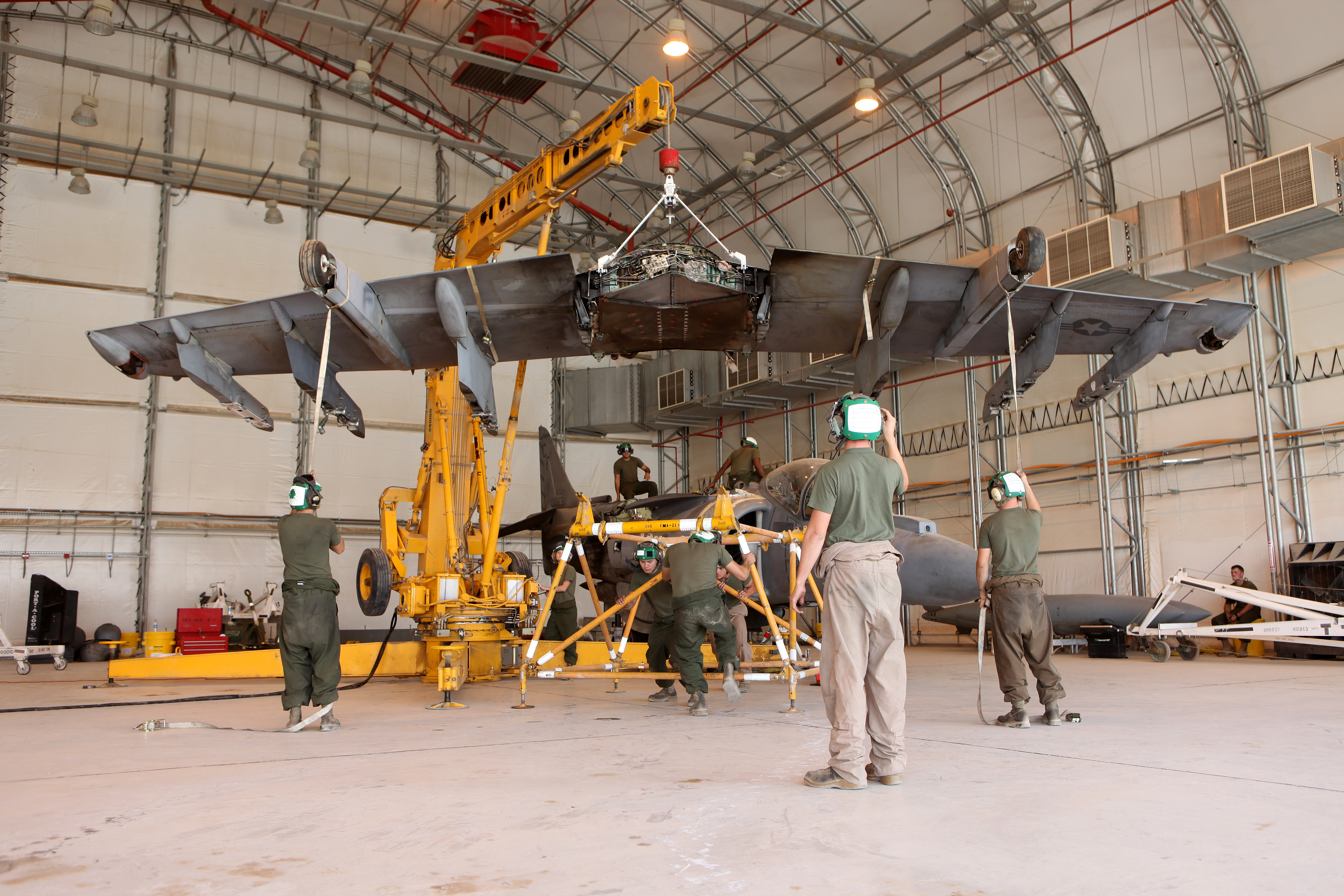
Marines replacing the one-piece supercritical wing of an AV-8B at Camp Bastion, Afghanistan (2012)

The Harrier II was the first combat aircraft to extensively employ carbon-fiber composite materials, exploiting their light weight and high strength; they are used in the wings, rudder, flaps, nose, forward fuselage, and tail. Twenty-six percent of the aircraft's structure is made of composites, reducing its weight by 480 lb (217 kg) compared to a conventional metal structure.

=== Differences between versions ===
Most of the first "day attack" AV-8B Harrier IIs were upgraded to Night Attack Harrier or Harrier II Plus standards, with the remainder being withdrawn from service. The AV-8B cockpit was also used for the early trialing of direct voice input which allows the pilot to use voice commands to issue instructions to the aircraft, using a system developed by Smiths Industries. The main attack avionics system in original aircraft was the nose-mounted Hughes AN/ASB-19 angle-rate bombing system. The system combined a TV imager and laser tracker to provide a highly accurate targeting capability. Defensive equipment include several AN/ALE-39 chaff-flare dispensers, an AN/ALR-67 radar warning receiver, and an AN/ALQ-126C jammer pod.

The trainer version of the AV-8B is the TAV-8B, seating two pilots in tandem. Among other changes, the forward fuselage features a 3 ft 11 in (1.19 m) extension to accommodate the second cockpit. To compensate for the slight loss of directional stability, the vertical stabilizer's area was enlarged through increases in chord (length of the stabilizer's root) and height. USMC TAV-8Bs feature the AV-8B's digital cockpit and new systems but have only two hardpoints and are not combat capable. Initial TAV-8Bs were powered by a 21,450 lbf (95.4 kN) F402-RR-406A engine, while later examples were fitted with the 23,000 lbf (105.8 kN) F402-RR-408A. In the early 2000s, 17 TAV-8Bs were upgraded to include a night-attack capability, the F402-RR-408 engine, and software and structural changes.

Fielded in 1991, the Night Attack Harrier was the first upgrade of the AV-8B. It differed from the original aircraft in having a forward-looking infrared (FLIR) camera added to the top of the nose cone, a wide Smiths Industries head-up display (HUD), provisions for night vision goggles, and a Honeywell digital moving map system. The FLIR uses thermal imaging to identify objects by their heat signatures. The variant was powered by the F402-RR-408 engine, which featured an electronic control system and was more powerful and reliable. The flare and chaff dispensers were moved, and the ram-air intake was lengthened at the fin's base. Initially known as the AV-8D, the night-attack variant was designated the AV-8B(NA).

The Harrier II Plus is very similar to the Night Attack variant, with the addition of an APG-65 multi-mode pulse-Doppler radar in an extended nose, allowing it to launch advanced beyond-visual-range missiles such as the AIM-120 AMRAAM. To make additional space for the radar, the angle-rate bombing system was removed. The radars used were taken from early F/A-18 aircraft, which had been upgraded with the related APG-73. According to aviation author Lon Nordeen, the changes "had a slight increase in drag and a bit of additional weight, but there really was not much difference in performance between the [–408-powered] Night Attack and radar Harrier II Plus aircraft".

== Operational history ==
=== United States Marine Corps ===
The AV-8B underwent standard evaluation to prepare for its USMC service. In the operational evaluation (OPEVAL), lasting from 31 August 1984 to 30 March 1985, four pilots and a group of maintenance and support personnel tested the aircraft under combat conditions. The aircraft was graded for its ability to meet its mission requirements for navigating, acquiring targets, delivering weapons, and evading and surviving enemy actions, all at the specified range and payload limits. The first phase of OPEVAL, running until 1 February 1985, required the AV-8B to fly both deep and close air support missions (deep air support missions do not require coordination with friendly ground forces) in concert with other close-support aircraft, as well as flying battlefield interdiction and armed reconnaissance missions. The aircraft flew from military installations at Marine Corps Base Camp Pendleton and Naval Air Weapons Station China Lake in California; Canadian Forces Base Cold Lake in Canada; and Marine Corps Air Station Yuma in Arizona.

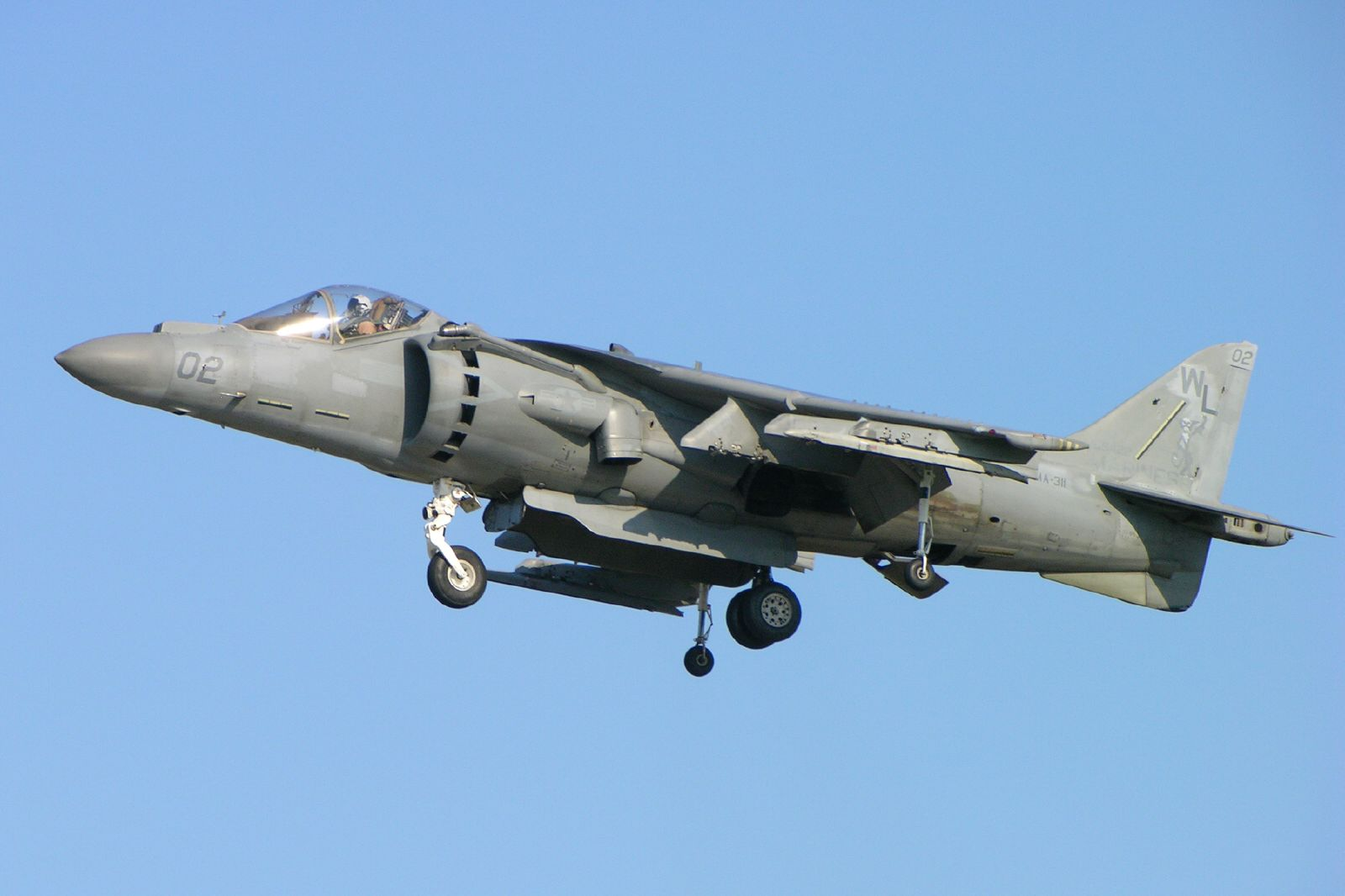
A USMC AV-8B hovering

The second phase of OPEVAL, which took place at MCAS Yuma from 25 February to 8 March, required the AV-8B to perform fighter escort, combat air patrol, and deck-launched intercept missions. Although the evaluation identified shortfalls in the design (subsequently rectified), OPEVAL was deemed successful. The AV-8B Harrier II reached initial operating capability (IOC) in January 1985 with USMC squadron VMA-331. (Note: According to Lon Nordeen, USMC squadron VMA-331 was reassigned to the AV-8B in January 1985 and achieved IOC in August 1985.)

The AV-8B saw extensive action in the Gulf War of 1990–91. Aircraft based on USS Nassau and Tarawa, and at on-shore bases, initially flew training and support sorties, as well as practicing with coalition forces. The AV-8Bs were to be held in reserve during the initial phase of the preparatory air assault of Operation Desert Storm. The AV-8B was first used in the war on the morning of 17 January 1991, when a call for air support from an OV-10 Bronco forward air controller against Iraqi artillery that was shelling Khafji and an adjacent oil refinery, brought the AV-8B into combat. The following day, USMC AV-8Bs attacked Iraqi positions in southern Kuwait. Throughout the war, AV-8Bs performed armed reconnaissance and worked in concert with coalition forces to destroy targets.

During Operations Desert Shield and Desert Storm, 86 AV-8Bs amassed 3,380 flights and about 4,100 flight hours, with a mission availability rate of over 90%. Five AV-8Bs were lost to enemy surface-to-air missiles, and two USMC pilots were killed. The AV-8B had an attrition rate of 1.5 aircraft for every 1,000 sorties flown. U.S. Army General Norman Schwarzkopf later named the AV-8B among the seven weapons—along with the F-117 Nighthawk and AH-64 Apache—that played a crucial role in the war. In the aftermath of the war, from 27 August 1992 until 2003, USMC AV-8Bs and other aircraft patrolled Iraqi skies in support of Operation Southern Watch. The AV-8Bs launched from amphibious assault ships in the Persian Gulf and from forward operating bases such as Ali Al Salem Air Base, Kuwait.

In 1999, the AV-8B participated in NATO's bombing of Yugoslavia during Operation Allied Force. Twelve Harriers were split evenly between the 24th and 26th Marine Expeditionary Units (MEU). AV-8Bs of the 24th MEU were introduced into combat on 14 April and over the next 14 days flew 34 combat air support missions over Kosovo. During their six-month deployment aboard USS Nassau, 24th MEU Harriers averaged a high mission-capable rate of 91.8%. On 28 April, the 24th MEU was relieved by the 26th MEU, based on USS Kearsarge. The first combat sorties of the unit's AV-8Bs occurred two days later, one aircraft being lost. The 26th MEU remained in the theater of operations until 28 May, when it was relocated to Brindisi, Italy.

USMC AV-8Bs took part in Operation Enduring Freedom in Afghanistan from 2001. The USMC 15th MEU arrived off the coast of Pakistan in October 2001. Operating from the unit's ships, four AV-8Bs began attack missions into Afghanistan on 3 November 2001. The 26th MEU and its AV-8Bs joined 15th MEU later that month. In December 2001, two AV-8Bs first deployed to a forward base at Kandahar in Afghanistan. More AV-8Bs were deployed with other USMC units to the region in 2002. The VMA-513 squadron deployed six Night Attack AV-8Bs to Bagram in October 2002. These aircraft each carried a LITENING targeting pod to perform reconnaissance missions along with attack and other missions, primarily at night.

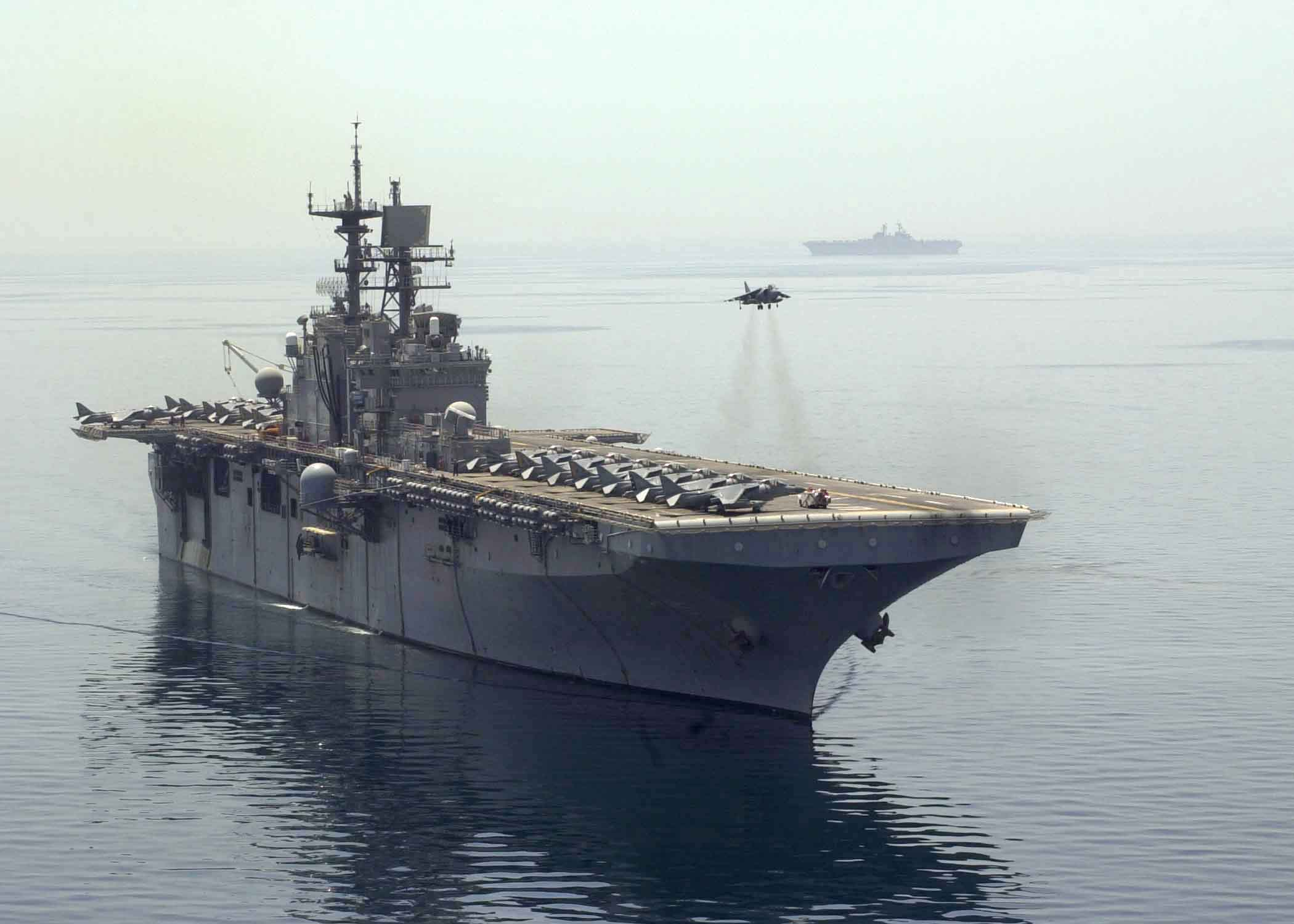
A USMC AV-8B hovers as many more are parked on the deck of amphibious assault ship USS Bataan, one month after the start of the Iraq War

The aircraft participated in the Iraq War in 2003, acting primarily in support of USMC ground units. During the initial action, 60 AV-8Bs were deployed on ships such as USS Bonhomme Richard and Bataan, from which over 1,000 sorties were flown throughout the war. When possible, land-based forward arming and refueling points were set up to enable prompt operations. USMC commander Lieutenant General Earl B. Hailston said that the Harriers were able to provide 24-hour support for ground forces, and noted that "The airplane ... became the envy of pilots even from my background ... there's an awful lot of things on the Harrier that I've found the Hornet pilots asking me [for] ... We couldn't have asked for a better record".

USMC sources documented the Harrier as holding an 85% aircraft availability record in the Iraq War; in just under a month of combat, the aircraft flew over 2,000 sorties. When used, the LITENING II targeting pod achieved greater than 75% kill effectiveness on targets. In a single sortie from USS Bonhomme Richard, a wave of Harriers inflicted heavy damage on a Republican Guard tank battalion in advance of a major ground assault on Al Kut. Harriers regularly operated in close support roles for friendly tanks, one of the aircraft generally carrying a LITENING pod. Despite the Harrier's high marks, the limited amount of time that each aircraft could remain on station, around 15–20 minutes, led to some calls from within the USMC for the procurement of AC-130 gunships, which could loiter for six hours and had a heavier close air support capability than the AV-8B. AV-8Bs were later used in combination with artillery to provide constant fire support for ground forces during heavy fighting in 2004 around the insurgent stronghold of Fallujah. The urban environment there required extreme precision for airstrikes.

On 20 March 2011, USMC AV-8Bs were launched from USS Kearsarge in support of Operation Odyssey Dawn, enforcing the UN no-fly zone over Libya. They carried out airstrikes on Sirte on 5 April 2011. Multiple AV-8Bs were involved in the defense of a downed F-15E pilot, attacking approaching Libyans prior to the pilot's extraction by a MV-22 Osprey. In addition to major conflicts, USMC AV-8Bs have been deployed in support of contingency and humanitarian operations, providing fixed-wing air cover and armed reconnaissance. The aircraft served in Somalia throughout the 1990s, Liberia (1990, 1996, and 2003), Rwanda (1994), Central African Republic (1996), Albania (1997), Zaire (1997), and Sierra Leone (1997).

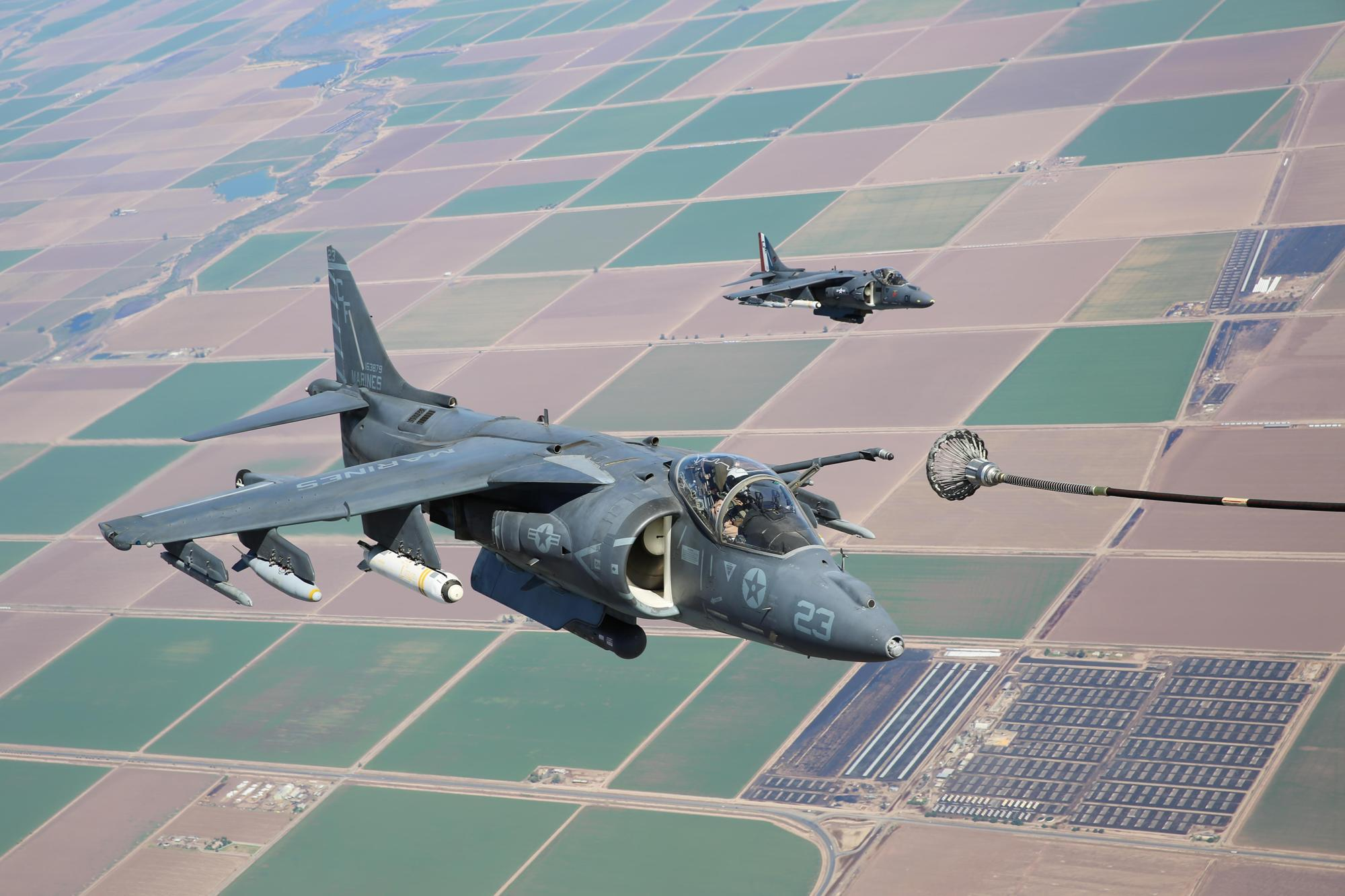
An AV-8B Harrier refuels during fixed-wing aerial refueling training

The AV-8B is to be replaced by the F-35B version of the Lockheed Martin F-35 Lightning II, which was planned to enter service in 2012. The USMC had sought a replacement since the 1980s and has argued strongly in favor of the development of the F-35B. The Harrier's performance in Iraq, including its ability to use forward operating bases, reinforced the need for a V/STOL aircraft in the USMC arsenal. In November 2011, the USN purchased the UK's fleet of 72 retired BAe Harrier IIs (63 single-seat GR.7/9/9As plus 9 twin-seat T.12/12As) and replacement engines to provide spares for the existing USMC Harrier II fleet. Although the March 2012 issue of the magazine AirForces Monthly states that the USMC intended to fly some of the ex-British Harrier IIs, instead of using them just for spare parts, the Naval Air Systems Command (NAVAIR) has since stated that the USMC has never had any plans to operate those Harriers.

On 14 September 2012, a Taliban raid destroyed six AV-8Bs and severely damaged two others while they were parked on the ramp at Camp Bastion in Afghanistan's Helmand Province. All of the aircraft belonged to VMFA-211. The two damaged AV-8Bs were flown out of Afghanistan in the hours after the attack. The attack was described as "the worst loss of U.S. airpower in a single incident since the Vietnam War." The lost aircraft were quickly replaced by those from VMA-231.

On 27 July 2014, USS Bataan began deploying USMC AV-8Bs over Iraq to provide surveillance of Islamic State (IS) forces. Surveillance operations continued after the start of Operation Inherent Resolve against IS militants. In early September 2014, a USMC Harrier from the 22nd MEU struck an IS target near the Haditha Dam in Iraq, marking the first time a USMC unit dropped ordnance in the operation. On 1 August 2016, USMC Harriers from USS Wasp began strikes against ISIL in Libya as part of manned and unmanned airstrikes on targets near Sirte, launching at least five times within two days. In January 2024 during the Red Sea crisis one of the Harriers was modified for air defense; its pilot Captain Earl Ehrhart is reported to have intercepted seven Houthi attack drones.

As of February 2025 the last AV-8B was scheduled for retirement "by the second half of 2027." In June 2026, the Marine Corps officially retired its Harriers.

=== Italian Navy ===
In the late 1960s, following a demonstration of the Hawker Siddeley Harrier on the Italian Navy (Marina Militare) helicopter carrier Andrea Doria, the country began investigating the possibility of acquiring the Harrier. Early efforts were hindered by a 1937 Italian law that prohibited the navy from operating fixed-wing aircraft because they were the domain of the air force. In early 1989, the law was changed to allow the navy to operate any fixed-wing aircraft with a maximum weight of over 3,300 lb (1,500 kg). Following a lengthy evaluation of the Sea Harrier and AV-8B, an order was placed for two TAV-8Bs in May 1989. Soon, a contract for a further 16 AV-8B Plus aircraft was signed. After the TAV-8Bs and the first three AV-8Bs, all subsequent Italian Navy Harriers were locally assembled by Alenia Aeronautica from kits delivered from the U.S. The two-seaters, the first to be delivered, arrived at Grottaglie in August 1991. They were used for proving flights with the navy's helicopter carriers and on the light aircraft carrier Giuseppe Garibaldi.

In early 1994, the initial batch of U.S.-built aircraft arrived at MCAS Cherry Point for pilot conversion training. The first Italian-assembled Harrier was rolled out the following year. In mid-January 1995, Giuseppe Garibaldi set off from Taranto to Somalia with three Harriers on board to maintain stability following the withdrawal of UN forces. The Harriers, flown by five Italian pilots, accumulated more than 100 flight hours and achieved 100% availability during the three-month deployment, performing reconnaissance and other missions. The squadron returned to port on 22 March.

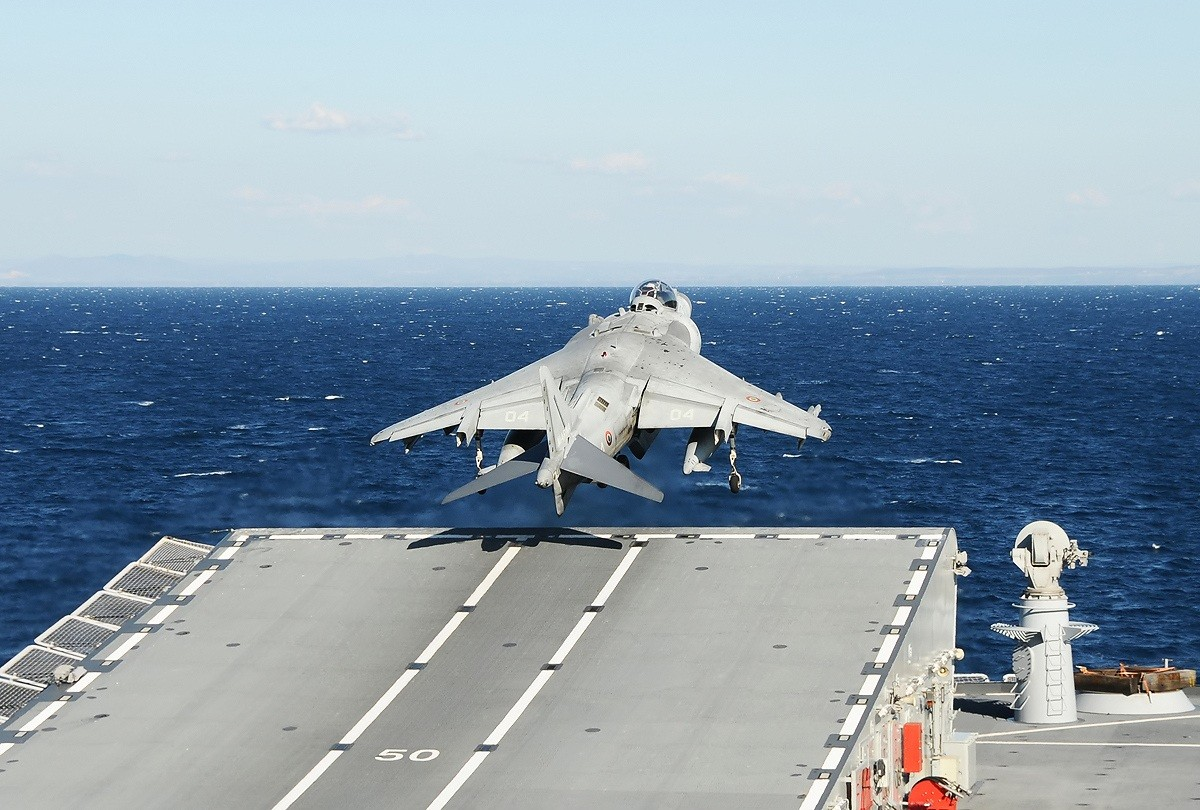
An Italian Navy AV-8B Plus Harrier II taking off from Italian aircraft carrier Cavour

In 1999, Italian AV-8Bs were used for the first time in combat missions when they were deployed aboard Giuseppe Garibaldi, which was participating in Operation Allied Force in Kosovo. Italian pilots conducted more than 60 sorties alongside other NATO aircraft, attacking the Yugoslav army and paramilitary forces and bombing the country's infrastructure with conventional and laser-guided bombs.

In 2000, the Italian Navy was looking to acquire 7 additional remanufactured aircraft to equip Giuseppe Garibaldi and a new carrier, Cavour. Existing aircraft, meanwhile, were updated to allow them to carry AIM-120 AMRAAMs and Joint Direct Attack Munition guided bombs. From November 2001 to March 2002, eight AV-8Bs were embarked aboard Giuseppe Garibaldi and were deployed to the Indian Ocean in support of Operation Enduring Freedom. The aircraft, equipped with LGBs, operated throughout January and February 2002, during which 131 missions were logged for a total of 647 flight hours.

In 2011, Italian Harriers, operating from Giuseppe Garibaldi, worked alongside Italian Typhoons and aircraft of other nations during Operation Unified Protector, part of the 2011 military intervention in Libya. They conducted airstrikes as well as intelligence and reconnaissance sorties over Libya, using the Litening targeting pods while armed with AIM-120 AMRAAMs and AIM-9 Sidewinders. In total, Italian military aircraft delivered 710 guided bombs and missiles during sorties: Italian Air Force Tornados and AMX fighter bombers delivered 550 bombs and missiles, while the eight Italian Navy AV-8Bs flying from Giuseppe Garibaldi dropped 160 guided bombs during 1,221 flight hours.

Italian Navy AV-8Bs are slated to be replaced by 20 F-35Bs, which will form the air wing of Cavour. In March 2025, it was stated that the Indonesian Navy was interested in acquiring Giuseppe Garibaldi from Italy, along with its surviving Harrier IIs.

=== Spanish Navy ===
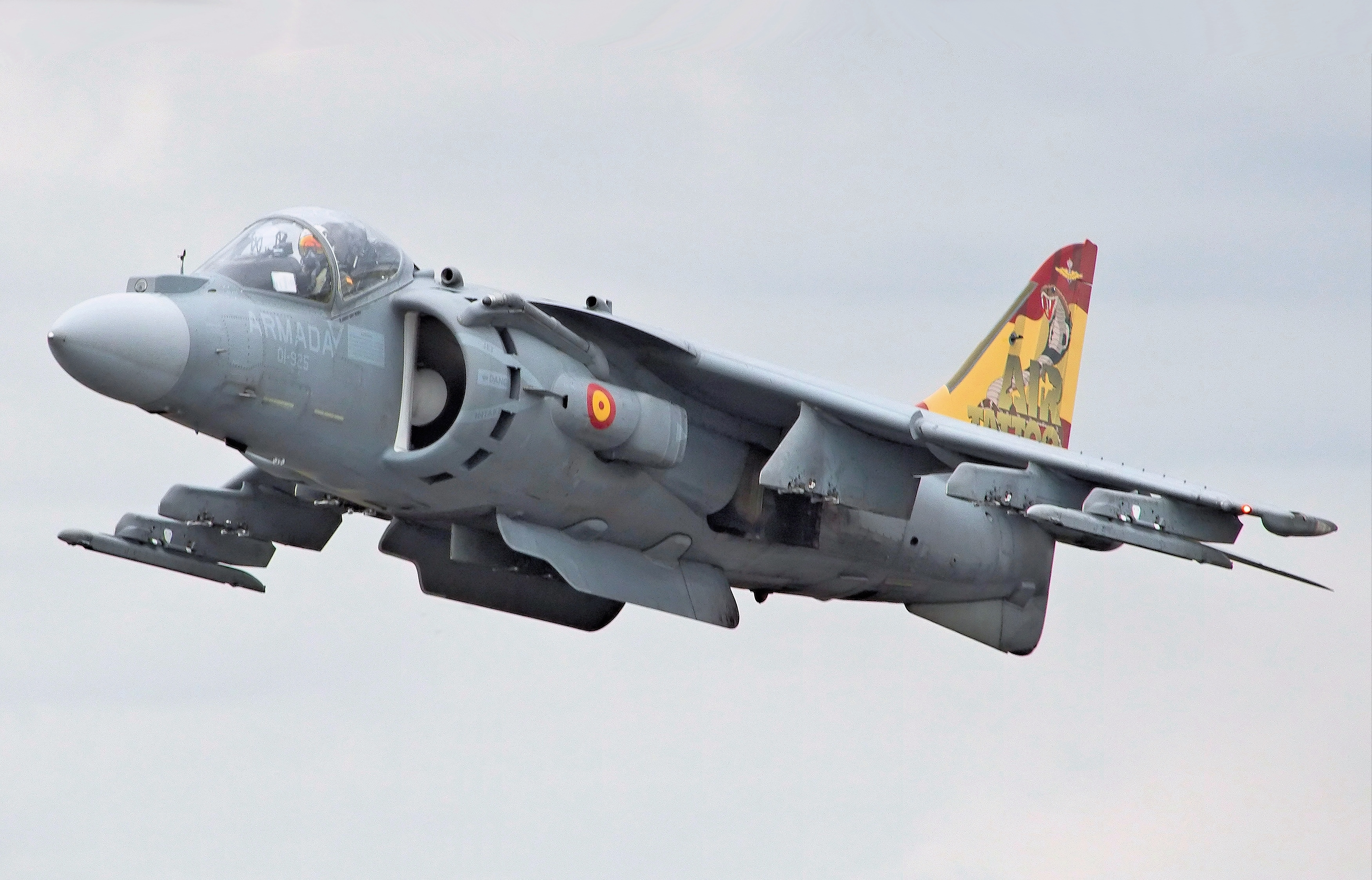
An EAV-8B Harrier II performing at RIAT in 2019

Spain, already using the AV-8S Matador, became the first international operator of the AV-8B by signing an order for 12 aircraft in March 1983. Designated VA-2 Matador II by the Spanish Navy (Armada Española), this variant is known as EAV-8B by McDonnell Douglas. Pilot conversion took place in the U.S. On 6 October 1987, the first three Matador IIs were delivered to Naval Station Rota. The new aircraft were painted in a two-tone matte gray finish, similar to U.S. Navy aircraft, and deliveries were complete by 1988.

BAe test pilots cleared the aircraft carrier Príncipe de Asturias for Harrier operations in July 1989. The carrier, which replaced the World War II-era Dédalo, had a 12° ski-jump ramp. It was originally planned that the first unit to operate the aircraft would be the 8^{a} Escuadrilla. This unit was disbanded on 24 October 1986, following the sales of AV-8S Matadors to Thailand. Instead, 9^{a} Escuadrilla was formed on 29 September 1987, to become part of the Alpha Carrier Air Group and operate the EAV-8B.

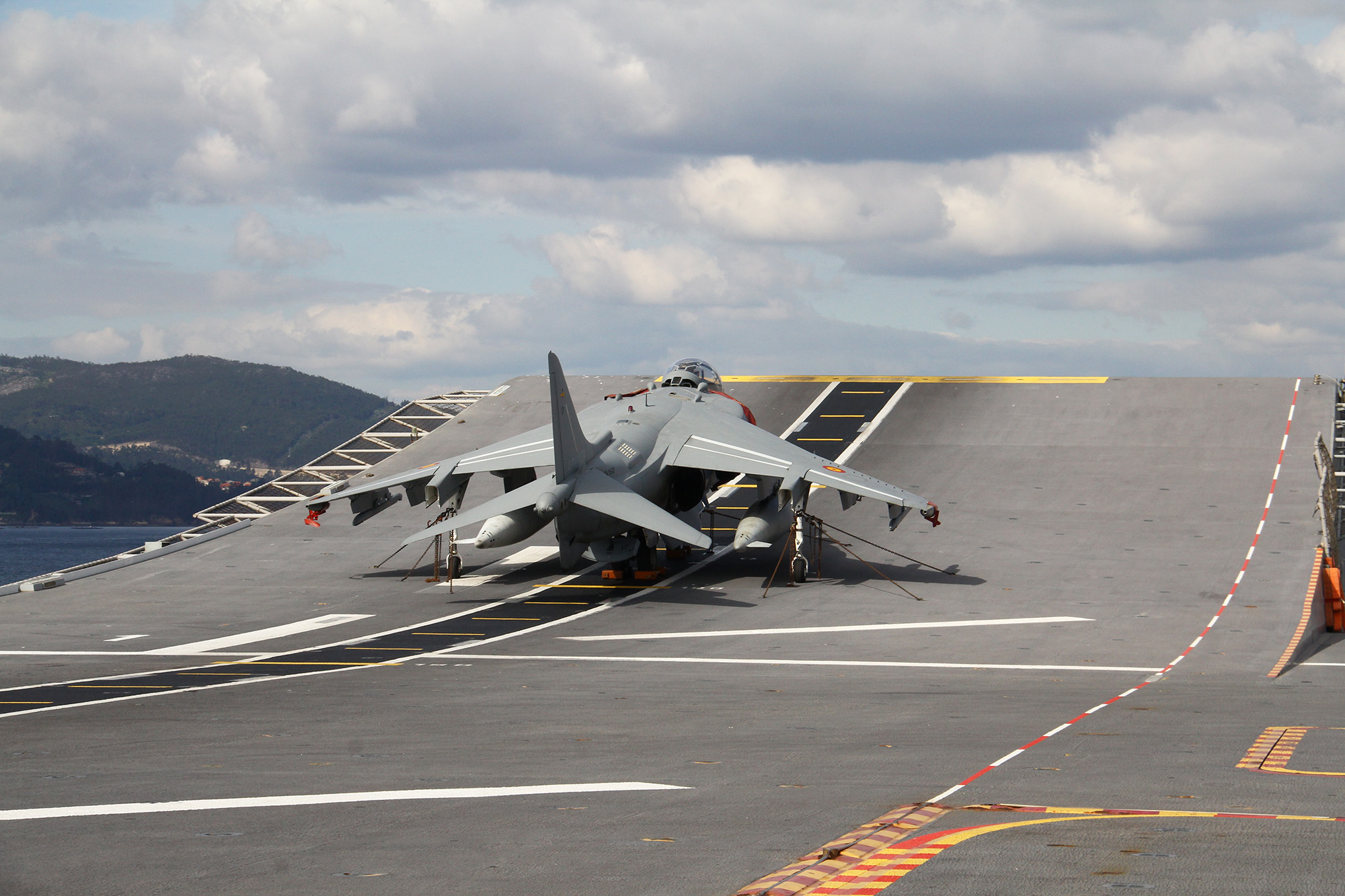
An EAV-8B+ Harrier II

In March 1993, under the September 1990 Tripartite MoU between the U.S., Italy, and Spain, eight EAV-8B Plus Matadors were ordered, along with a twin-seat TAV-8B. Deliveries of the Plus-standard aircraft started in 1996. On 11 May 2000, Boeing and the NAVAIR finalized a contract to remanufacture Spanish EAV-8Bs to bring them up to Plus standard. Boeing said the deal required it to remanufacture two EAV-8Bs, with an option for another seven aircraft; other sources say the total was 11 aircraft. The remanufacture allowed the aircraft to carry four AIM-120 AMRAAMs, enhanced the pilot's situational awareness through the installation of new radar and avionics, and provided a new engine. Eventually, 5 aircraft were modified, the last having been delivered on 5 December 2003.

Spanish EAV-8Bs joined Operation Deny Flight, enforcing the UN's no-fly zone over Bosnia and Herzegovina. Spain did not send its aircraft carrier to participate in the Iraq War in 2003, instead deploying F/A-18s and other aircraft to Turkey to defend that country against potential Iraqi attacks. Starting in 2007, Spain was looking to replace its Harrier IIs—with the likely option being the F-35B. The Spanish government, in May 2014 however, announced that it had decided to extend the aircraft's service life to beyond 2025 due to a lack of funds for a replacement aircraft.

Following the decommissioning of Príncipe de Asturias in February 2013, the sole naval platform from which Spanish Harrier IIs can operate is the amphibious assault ship Juan Carlos I.

The Spanish government has extended the AV-8B's lifespan into the 2030s, acquiring airframes from the US Marine Corps to sustain its fleet.

== Variants ==
YAV-8B
Two prototypes converted in 1978 from existing AV-8A airframes (BuNo 158394 and 158395).
AV-8B Harrier II
The initial "day attack" variant.

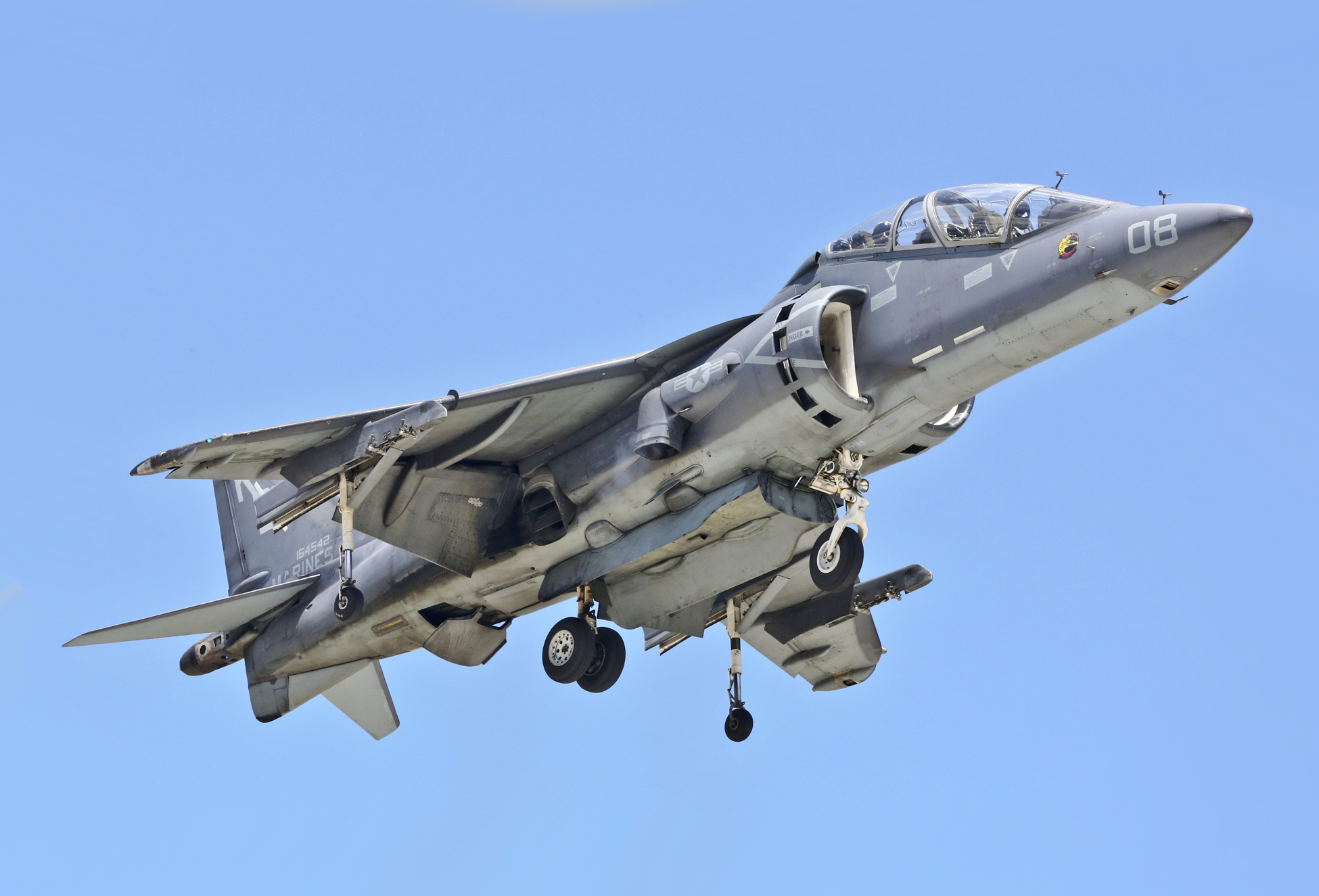
The TAV-8B trainer variant of the Harrier

AV-8B Harrier II Night Attack
Improved version with FLIR, an upgraded cockpit with night-vision goggle compatibility, and the more powerful Rolls-Royce Pegasus 11 engine.
AV-8B Harrier II Plus
Similar to the Night Attack variant, with the addition of an APG-65 radar and separate targeting pod. It is used by the USMC, Spanish Navy, and Italian Navy. Forty-six were built.
TAV-8B Harrier II
Two-seat trainer version.
EAV-8B Matador II
Company designation for the Spanish Navy version.
EAV-8B Matador II Plus
The AV-8B Harrier II Plus, ordered for the Spanish Navy.
Harrier GR5, GR7, GR9
See British Aerospace Harrier II.

== Operators ==
Italy

- Italian Navy

- Gruppo Aerei Imbarcati (1991–present)
Spain

- Spanish Navy

- 9a Escuadrilla Aeronaves (1987–present)

Former operators
United States

- United States Marine Corps
  - VMA-211 "Wake Island Avengers" (1990–2016)
  - VMA-214 "The Black Sheep" (1989–2022)
  - VMA-223 "Bulldogs" (1987–2026)
  - VMA-231 "Ace of Spades" (1985–2025)
  - VMA-311 "Tomcats" (1988–2020)
  - VMA-331 "Bumblebees" (1985–1992)
  - VMA-513 "Flying Nightmares" (1987–2013)
  - VMA-542 "Tigers" (1986–2023)
  - VMAT-203 "Hawks" (1983–2021)
- United States Navy
  - VX-9 "The Vampires" (unknown)
  - VX-31 "Dust Devils" (unknown–2025)

== Accidents ==
During its service with the USMC, the Harrier has had an accident rate three times that of the Corps' F/A-18s. As of July 2013, approximately 110 aircraft have been damaged beyond repair since the type entered service in 1985, the first accident occurring in March 1985. The Los Angeles Times reported in 2003 that the Harrier family had the highest rate of major accidents among military aircraft in service at that time, with 148 accidents and 45 people killed. Author Lon Nordeen notes that several other USMC single-engine strike aircraft, like the A-4 Skyhawk and A-7 Corsair II, had higher accident rates.

Accidents have in particular been connected to the proportionate amount of time the aircraft spends taking off and landing, which are the most critical phases in flight. The AV-8 was dubbed a "widow maker" by some in the military. Further analysis shows that U.S. Marine senior officers never understood the uniqueness of the aircraft. Cutbacks in senior maintenance personnel and pilot mistakes had a disastrous effect on the safety of the American-operated AV-8B and unfairly gained it a negative reputation in the U.S. press.

== Aircraft on display ==
- BuNo 158394 – YAV-8B on static display at the U.S. Space & Rocket Center in Huntsville, Alabama.
- BuNo 161396 – AV-8B on static display at the National Museum of the Marine Corps in Triangle, Virginia.
- BuNo 161397 – AV-8B on static display at the Sullenberger Aviation Museum in Charlotte, North Carolina.
- BuNo 161576 – AV-8B on static display at the Patuxent River Naval Air Museum in Lexington Park, Maryland.
- BuNo 163863 – AV-8B on static display at MCAS Cherry Point in Havelock, North Carolina.
- BuNo 164554 – AV-8B on static display at the Naval Air Station Wildwood Aviation Museum in Cape May, New Jersey.
- BuNo 164560 – AV-8B on static display at the Hickory Aviation Museum in Hickory, North Carolina.
- BuNo 165002 – AV-8B on static display at the Tillamook Air Museum in Tillamook, Oregon.
- BuNo 165357 – AV-8B on static display at the Fort Worth Aviation Museum in Fort Worth, Texas.
- BuNo 165572 – AV-8B on static display at the Flying Leatherneck Aviation Museum in Irvine, California.
- BuNo 165574 – AV-8B on static display at the Pima Air & Space Museum in Tucson, Arizona.
- BuNo 165576 – AV-8B on static display at the Arizona Commemorative Air Force Museum in Mesa, Arizona.
- BuNo 165579 – AV-8B on static display at the Castle Air Museum in Atwater, California.

== Specifications (AV-8B Harrier II Plus) ==
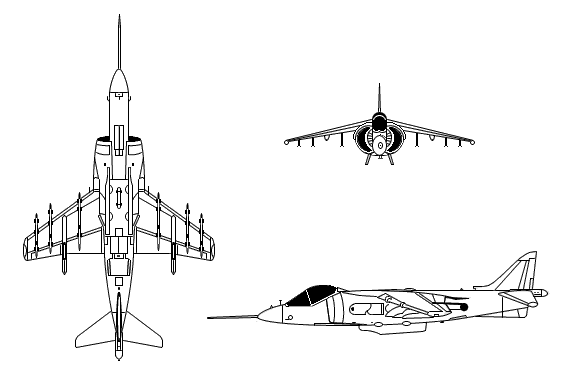
Orthographic projection of the AV-8B Harrier II

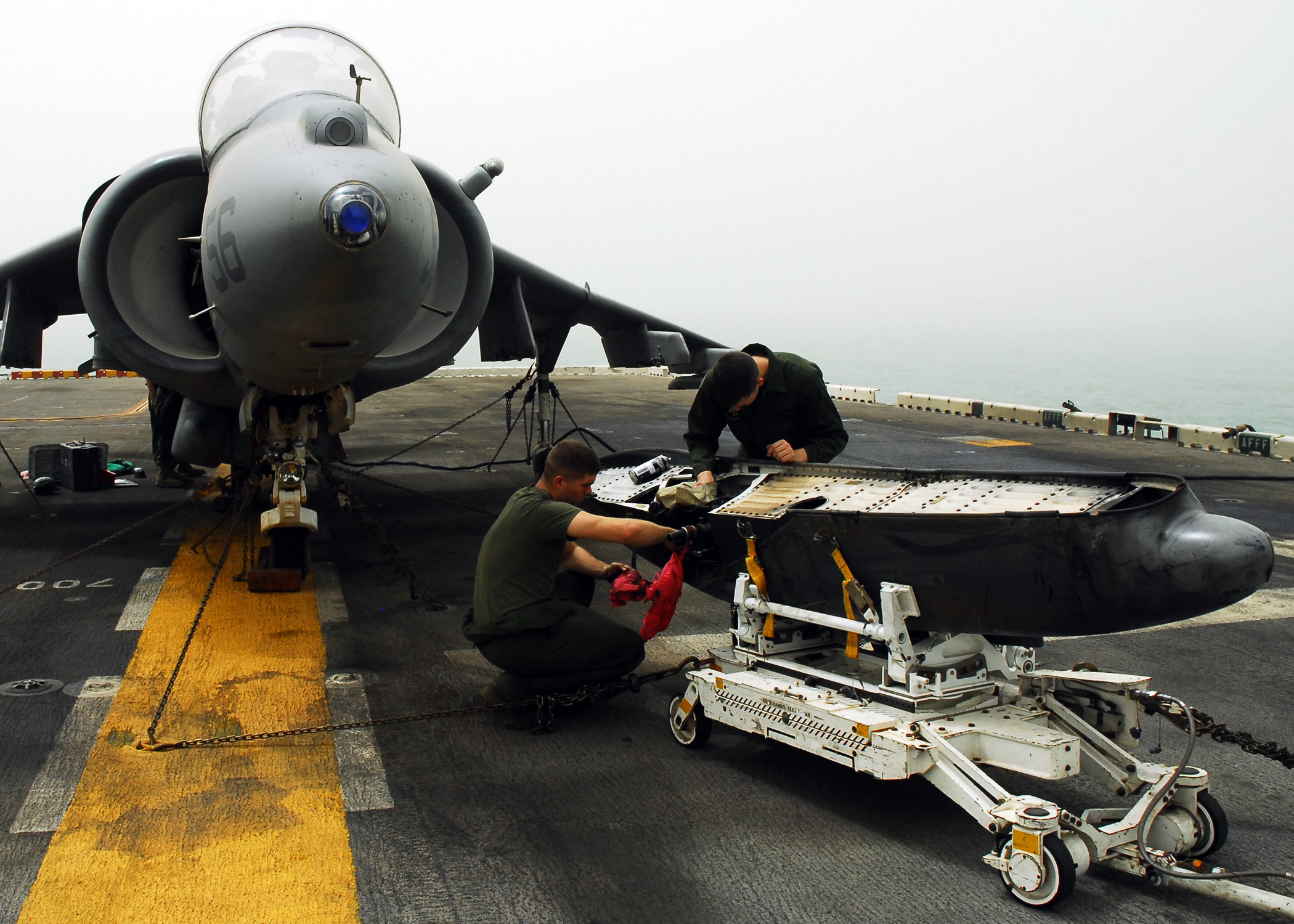
A detached 25 mm cannon pod being worked upon by ground crew

Data from Nordeen, Boeing, and Airforce-technology.com

General characteristics

- Crew: 1 pilot
- Length: 46 ft 4 in (14.12 m)
- Wingspan: 30 ft 4 in (9.25 m)
- Height: 11 ft 8 in (3.55 m)
- Wing area: 243.4 sq ft (22.61 m^{2})
- Airfoil: supercritical airfoil
- Empty weight: 13,968 lb (6,340 kg)
- Gross weight: 22,950 lb (10,410 kg)
- Maximum takeoff weight:
  - Rolling takeoff: 31,000 lb (14,100 kg)
  - Vertical takeoff: 20,755 lb (9,415 kg)
- Powerplant: 1 × Rolls-Royce Pegasus F402-RR-408 (Mk 107) vectored-thrust turbofan, 23,500 lbf (105 kN) thrust

Performance

- Maximum speed: 585 kn (673 mph, 1,083 km/h)
- Maximum speed: Mach 0.9
- Range: 1,200 nmi (1,400 mi, 2,200 km)
- Combat range: 300 nmi (350 mi, 556 km)
- Ferry range: 1,800 nmi (2,100 mi, 3,300 km)
- Rate of climb: 14,700 ft/min (75 m/s)
- Wing loading: 94.29 lb/sq ft (460.4 kg/m^{2})
- Thrust/weight: 0.948

Armament

- Guns: 1× General Dynamics GAU-12 Equalizer 25 mm (0.984 in) 5-barreled rotary cannon mounted under-fuselage in the left pod, with 300 rounds of ammunition in the right pod
- Hardpoints: 6× under-wing pylon and 1x under-fuselage stations holding up to 9,200 lb (4,200 kg) of payload:
- Rockets:
  - LAU-10 four-round Zuni pods
  - LAU-68 (7 round) or LAU-61 (19 round) rocket pods for Hydra 70/APKWS 70 mm rockets
- Missiles:
  - Air-to-air missiles:
    - 4× AIM-9 Sidewinder or similar-sized infrared-guided missiles
    - 4× AIM-120 AMRAAM (on radar equipped AV-8B Plus variants)
  - Air-to-surface missiles:
    - 4× AGM-65 E/F Maverick
    - 4x AGM-122 Sidearm (SEAD missile used by USMC)
- Bombs:
  - CBU-100/Mk 20 Rockeye II cluster bombs (CBUs)
  - Mark 81, 82, or 83 bombs of the Mark 80 bomb series
  - GBU-12 or GBU-16 laser-guided bombs
  - GBU-38, GBU-32, or GBU-54 Joint Direct Attack Munitions
  - Mark 77 fire bomb
- Others:
  - up to 4× 300/330/370 US Gallon drop tanks (pylon stations No. 2, 3, 5, & 6 are wet plumbed)
  - Intrepid Tiger II electronic jammer
  - Mk106 (6.6 lb (3 kg)) and Mk76 (31 lb (14 kg)) practice bombs

Avionics

- Raytheon APG-65 radar
- AN/AAQ-28V LITENING targeting pod (on AV-8B Night Attack and radar-equipped AV-8B Plus variants)
- AN/AYK-14(V) Weapons Systems Computer

== Popular culture ==
As part of its 1996 Pepsi Stuff marketing campaign, Pepsi ran an advertisement promising a Harrier jet to anyone who collected 7 million Pepsi Points, a gag that backfired when a participant attempted to take advantage of the ability to buy additional points for 10 cents each to claim a jet for US$700,000 (~$1.32 million in 2025). When Pepsi turned him down, a lawsuit ensued, in which the judge ruled that any reasonable person would conclude that the advertisement was a joke.

== See also ==
Related development

- Hawker Siddeley Harrier

Related lists

- List of Harrier family losses
- List of active United States military aircraft
- List of military electronics of the United States
