= Australian Industry and Defence Network =

The Australian Industry & Defence Network Inc. (AIDN) is the industry association for small and medium enterprises (SMEs) doing business in the defence and security sectors in Australia and abroad.

== See also ==
- Defence industry of Victoria
