= AN/APG-79 =

US military aircraft fire-control radar

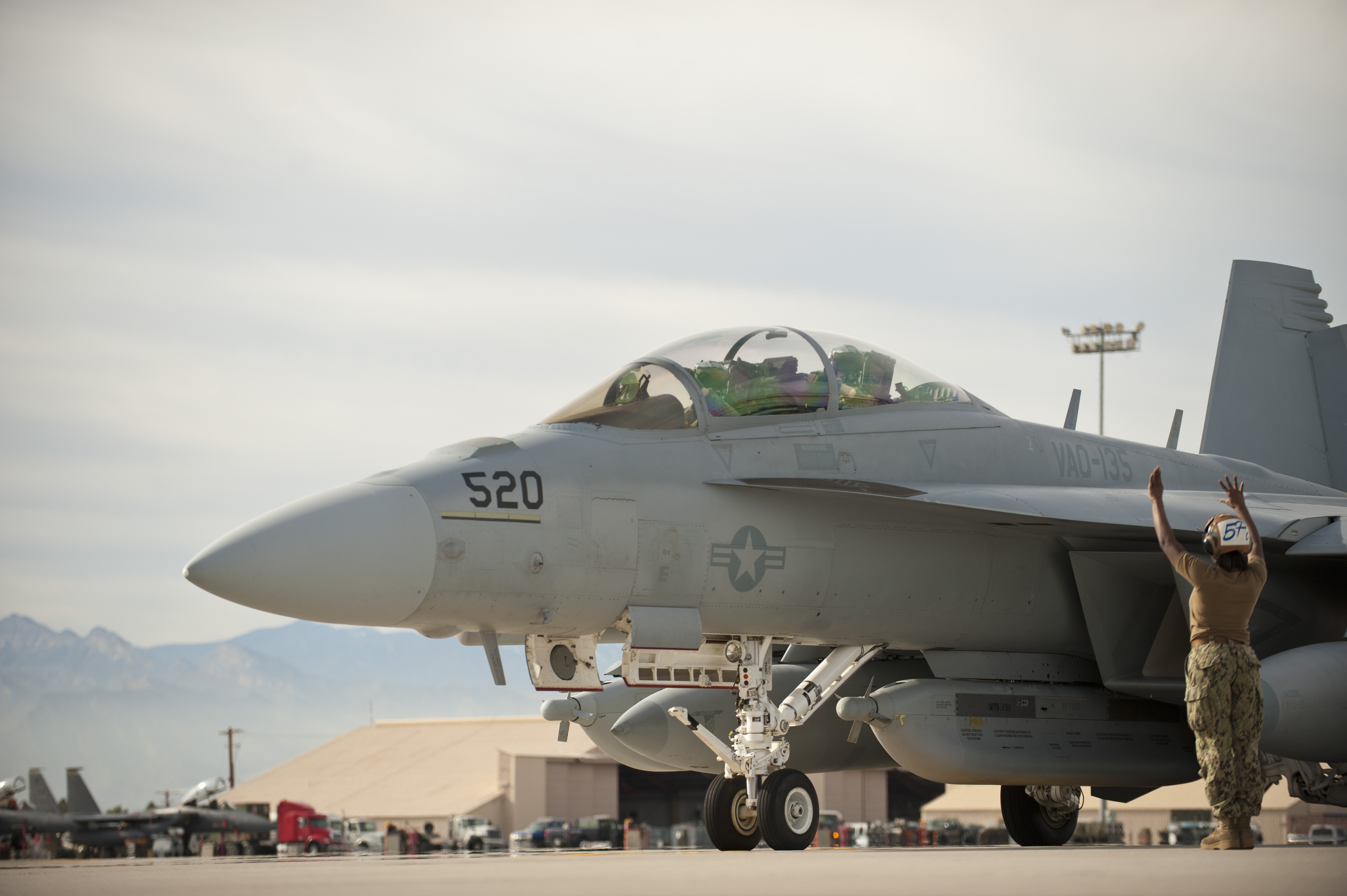
AN/APG-79 is the main radar on the F/A-18E/F Super Hornet and its derivative EA-18G Growler

The AN/APG-79 is an active electronically scanned array (AESA) radar developed for the F/A-18E/F Super Hornet and EA-18G Growler aircraft of the United States Navy. The radar replaces the legacy AN/APG-73 on the Super Hornet. AESA technology provides quick updates on multiple targets, and its solid-state antenna construction makes it more reliable and cost-effective than traditional radar systems. The radar has a range of up to 150 km (81 nmi; 93 mi) tracking multiple targets simultaneously.

In accordance with the Joint Electronics Type Designation System (JETDS), the "AN/APG-79" designation represents the 79th design of an Army-Navy airborne electronic device for radar fire-control equipment. The JETDS system also now is used to name all Department of Defense electronic systems.

== Milestones ==
As of July 2008, Raytheon had delivered one hundred APG-79 sets to the US Navy, with a contract for 437 more. In an April 2011 press release, Raytheon announced they had delivered the 250th APG-79.

In January 2013, the Director, Operational Test and Evaluation (DOT&E) disclosed poor reliability issues with the APG-79 radar during its initial operational testing as a result of software instability.

== Variants ==
=== AN/APG-79(V)4 ===
The AN/APG-79(V)4 was selected in December 2020 for retrofitting US Navy and US Marine Corps' F/A-18C/D Hornets, and upgrading the fleets of Canadian CF-188 Hornets,. The APG-79(V)4 uses gallium nitride (GaN) transmit/receive modules, which enables the radar to achieve comparable performance to the larger F/A-18E/F APG-79 from the smaller Legacy Hornet aperture. The greater power density of the GaN modules required the installation of a liquid cooling system, compared to the forced-air cooling on the legacy AN/APG-73.

=== AN/APQ-188 ===
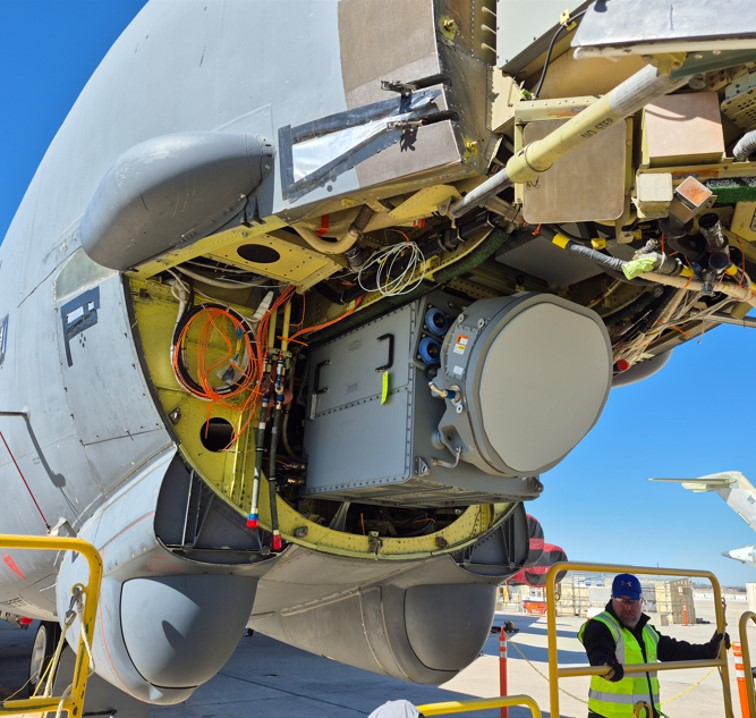
AN/APQ-188 on B-52.

The AN/APQ-188 is the designation for an upgraded variant of the APG-79 adapted by Raytheon for the B-52 Stratofortress Radar Modernization Program (RMP), replacing the Cold War-era mechanically scanned AN/APQ-166. The new radar would also incorporate technology from the AN/APG-82(V)1 of the F-15E Strike Eagle/F-15EX Eagle II aircraft. Under the RMP, the AN/APQ-188 would replace the existing APQ-166 and the upgraded aircraft would be redesignated as the B-52J.

== Operators ==
- Australia
  - Royal Australian Air Force
- Canada
  - Royal Canadian Air Force
- United States
  - United States Navy
  - United States Marines

== See also ==
- AN/APG-65 radar family
- AN/APG-82
- AN/APG-76
- Similar US military aircraft fire control radars
- List of radars
- List of military electronics of the United States
