= AN/APG-65 radar family =

Military aircraft family of radar systems

The AN/APG-65 and AN/APG-73 are designations for a family of all-weather multimode airborne radar systems designed by Hughes Aircraft (now Raytheon) for the F/A-18 Hornet, and used on a variety of fighter aircraft types; the APG-73 on the F/A-18E/F Super Hornet has been replaced by the APG-79, initially intended to be an upgraded AESA version but eventually became a largely new radar design.

These I band (8 to 12 GHz) pulse-Doppler radar systems are designed for both air-to-air and air-to-surface missions. For air-to-air operations they incorporate a variety of search, track and track-while-scan modes to give the pilot a complete look-down/shoot-down capability. Air-to-surface modes include Doppler beam sharpened sector and patch mapping, medium range synthetic aperture radar, fixed and moving ground target track and sea surface search. In the F/A-18, the radar is installed in a slide-out nose rack to facilitate maintenance.

== AN/APG-65 ==
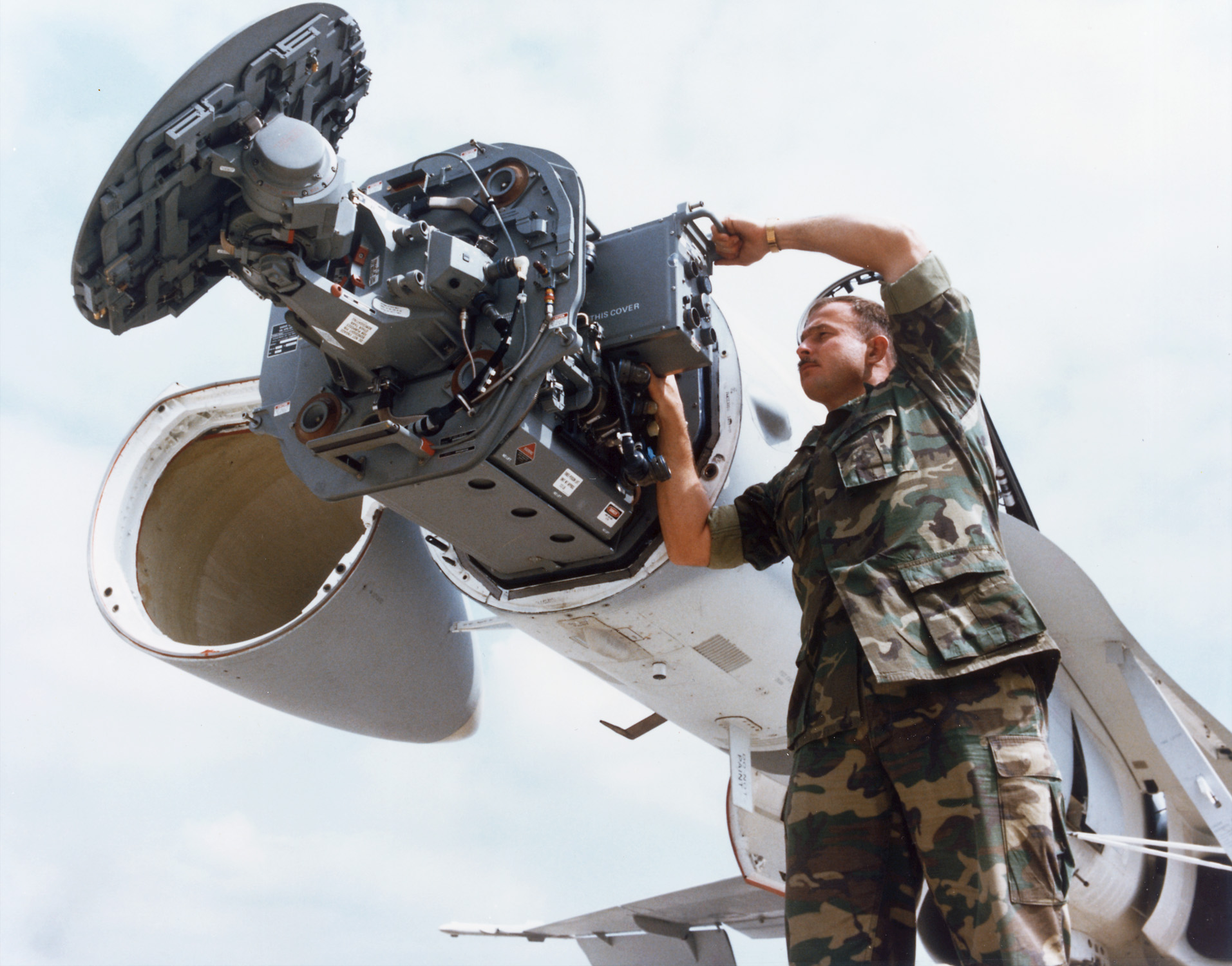
AN/APG-65 radar installed in an F/A-18 Hornet.

The APG-65 was developed in the late 1970s and has been operational since 1983. The radar includes a velocity search (to provide maximum detection range capability against nose aspect targets), range-while-search (to detect all-aspect targets), track-while-scan (which, when combined with an autonomous missile such as AIM-120, gives the aircraft a fire-and-forget capability), single target track, gun director and raid assessment (which enables the operator to expand the region centred on a single tracked target, permitting radar separation of closely spaced targets) operating modes.

Although no longer in production, the APG-65 remains in service in F/A-18 Hornet strike fighters of the U.S. Navy and Marine Corps, and the air forces of Canada, Kuwait, and Spain. It has also been adapted to upgrade the German and Greek F-4 Phantom aircraft, and the AV-8B Harrier II Plus for the U.S. Marine Corps and the Spanish and Italian Navies.

== AN/APG-73 ==
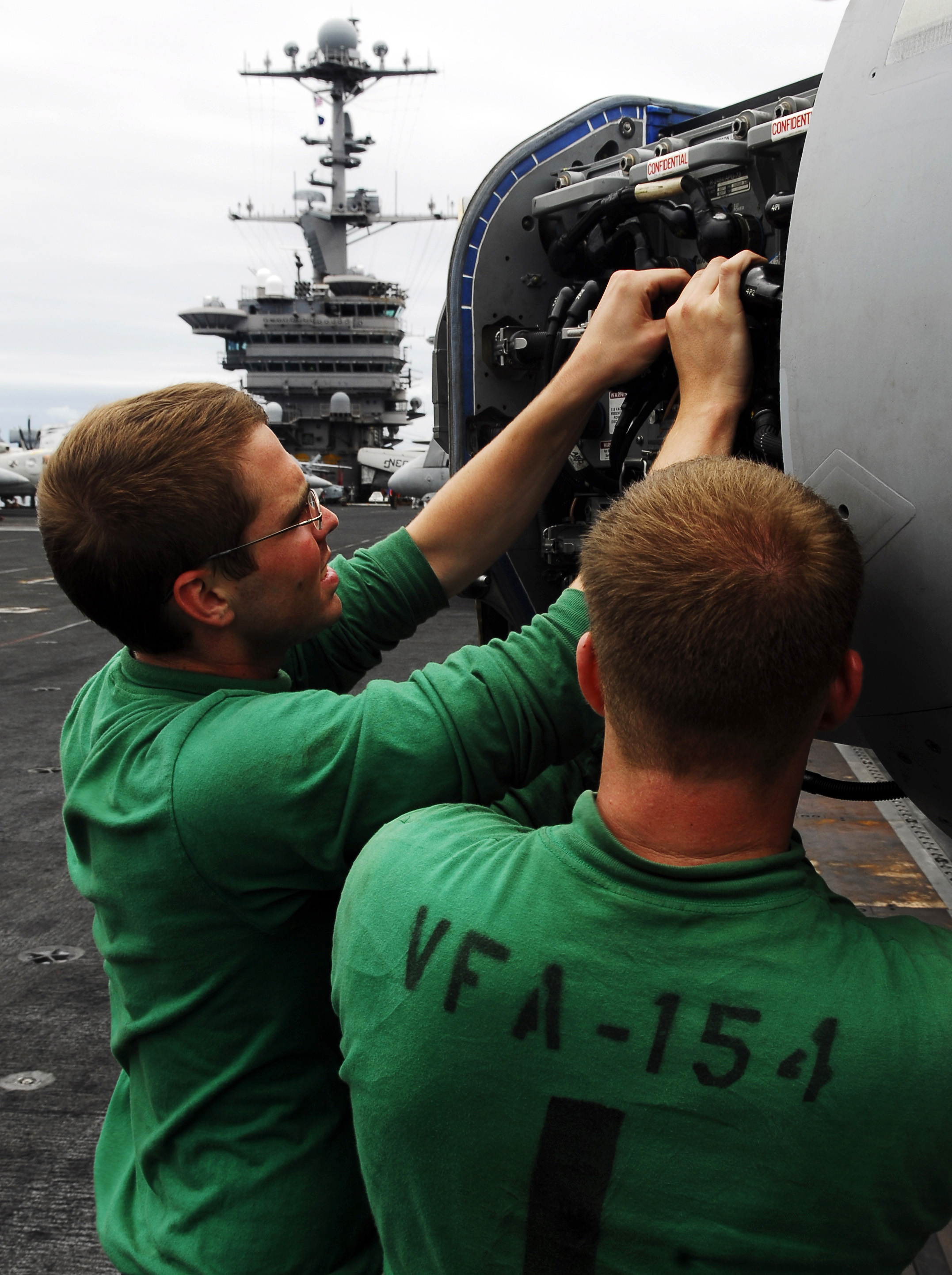
Routine maintenance on the radar system of an F/A-18F Super Hornet.

The APG-73 is a late 1980s "upgrade of the APG-65 that provides higher throughputs, greater memory capacity, improved reliability, and easier maintenance". To reduce production costs, many of the upgraded radar's modules are common with the APG-70 (F-15E Strike Eagle) radar; its software engineers chose the JOVIAL programming language so that they could borrow and adapt existing software written for the APG-70. When fitted with a motion-sensing subsystem and stretch waveform generator and special test equipment, the APG-73 can generate high resolution ground maps and make use of 'advanced' image correlation algorithms to enhance weapon designation accuracy.

Since 1992, the APG-73 has been operational in U.S. Navy and Marine Corps F/A-18C/D Hornet aircraft; early models of the U.S. Navy F/A-18E/F Super Hornet; and in the air forces of Finland, Switzerland, Malaysia, Canada, and Australia. A total of 932 APG-73 systems were delivered, with the final delivery in 2006.

== See also ==
- List of radars
- List of military electronics of the United States
