= Defence industry of Victoria =

This article provides information on the industrial sector in Victoria (Australia) that supplies goods and services to defence and military customers (national governments) and associated supply chain.

== Defence industry activity in Victoria ==
The Government of Victoria has stated that the defence industry, including military equipment manufacture as well as design, technology support and other services, is a priority industry for the economic development of the State.

Some examples of defence projects completed or underway in Victoria include:

- ANZAC class frigate project – ten frigates at a total project value of over $7 billion constructed by Tenix Defence at Williamstown
- Joint Strike Fighter – to date, twelve Victorian companies have been awarded contracts to work on the JSF F-35 project to provide key components, engineering and design services, which represents about 60 percent of total JSF work done in Australia
- P3 Orion Avionics Upgrade – the $750m upgrade of RAAF's maritime patrol aircraft at Avalon
- JORN – A$1.1 billion project to design and manufacture the Jindalee Operational Radar Network was completed in Melbourne
- Nulka Decoy Project – Victoria is at the centre of the Nulka ship defence system project, a highly successful commercialisation of DSTO technology
- Evolved Sea Sparrow Missile Project – key elements of the flight control system for the ESSM were developed in Victoria
- Munitions – all domestic production of military munitions occurs at Benalla
- F/A-18 Hornet Fighter Aircraft – Australia's fighter aircraft fleet was assembled at Avalon with composite components manufactured at Fishermans Bend in Melbourne
- High Mobility Engineering Vehicles – delivery of 27 HMEVs completed for the Army, and 40 units sold to the US. High interest has been shown from China, Canada and the United Arab Emirates
- Bushmaster IMV – full rate production of 700 Bushmaster vehicles is underway at Bendigo. Interest has been shown by the US, Iraq, Saudi Arabia and the United Arab Emirates
- Canberra class large amphibious ship project – Tenix Defence (now part of BAE Systems Australia) has been announced as the preferred tenderer to build two new large amphibious ships (landing ship helicopter docks, or LHD) for the Royal Australian Navy at a cost of around $3 billion.

Victorian defence businesses have also enjoyed successes in defence exports and global integration. For example: Tenix Defence is completing Project Protector at Williamstown for the New Zealand Government, Thales Australia has sold military vehicles to the US, Canada, the UAE and the Netherlands, Nulka and ESSM technologies have been successfully exported, and GKN is providing high level design support to international primes on global projects such as Joint Strike Fighter.

Victoria is also home to the Defence Materials Technology Centre, Defence Science and Technology Organisation (DSTO) and the Commonwealth Scientific and Industrial Research Organisation (CSIRO).

== Scale of defence industry in Victoria ==
Note: unless otherwise indicated, data in this section is from "Project to measure Victoria's defence industry activity" written by Australian Aerospace and Defence Innovations Ltd, June 2006.

Approximately 25 percent of defence industry activity in Australia occurs in Victoria, despite the fact that Victoria has few major military bases and consequently fewer opportunities to supply maintenance and overhaul services to Defence assets. The core of Victoria's defence industry (being those businesses with more than 50 percent of revenue derived from defence customers) has a turnover in excess of $1.2 billion per annum, employing over 10,500 Victorians.

About 60 percent of this employment is by the 19 Prime and Tier 1 defence contractors that undertake defence work in Victoria.

This activity is separate from those people employed directly in the Australian Defence Force and Defence civilian administration. There are around 6000 military employees based in Victoria and almost 4000 civilian employees. These employment and activity numbers does also not include research institutions and related non-profit activities. For example, there are around 600 people employed in Victoria by the Defence Science and Technology Organisation.

The major sources of defence industry activity (turnover) in Victoria in 2005–06 were:

Sector	Turnover
Naval shipbuilding and repair	$400 million
Aerospace structural design and manufacturing	$240 million
Weapons and ordnance	$200 million
Aerospace electronics	$140 million
Land vehicles	$85 million
Non-aerospace electronics	$80 million
Aerospace maintenance and overhaul	$75 million

Supporting the defence industry, there are in excess of 800 firms that supply goods and services to defence businesses, and many more that enter and exit the defence sector for particular projects.

87 percent of Victorian defence companies also generate additional business outside the defence market.

Four of Australia's top five defence businesses have substantial operations in Victoria.

In 2005–06, turnover per employee for Victorian defence businesses was $193,000 for the total industry. Prime/Tier 1 productivity was $171,000 per employee while productivity in small-to-medium-sized enterprises (SMEs) was over $250,000 per employee.

Sixty-seven percent of defence businesses operating in Victoria are actively exporting defence and non-defence goods and services to a total value of $1.05 billion in 2005–06. This is around 6 percent of total Victorian exports. Around 40 percent of the total turnover for the core Victorian defence companies in 2005–06 was attributed to international markets. Victoria's defence businesses were responsible for more than two-thirds of Australia's defence exports in 2005–06.

== Industry support ==
Support to the Victorian defence industry is primary delivered or coordinated by the Department of State Development, Business and Innovation, which has a dedicated Defence Industry Unit.

To guide policy development and lead on strategic projects the Government also established the Defence Council Victoria on 24 July 2007. The Council provides the Government with high level advice on current defence industry issues.

The Defence Council Victoria initiative was announced as part of the Government's strategic framework A Roadmap for Victoria’s Defence Industries released on 10 August 2006.

== Defence companies in Victoria ==
The following companies are based in, or have significant operations in, Victoria:

- Savi Technology
- Aerosonde
- Adacel
- BAE Systems Australia
- Thales Australia
- GKN
- Frazer-Nash Consultancy
- Radio Frequency Systems
- BMT Group
- Lockheed Martin
- Chemring
- AAII Corporation
- QinetiQ
- L3 Communications
- SAIC
- TKMS
- Boeing Australia (Hawker de Havilland)
- Elbit Systems of Australia
- IDES
- Winchester Repeating Arms Company
