= HOTAS =

Man-machine interface concept for cockpit design

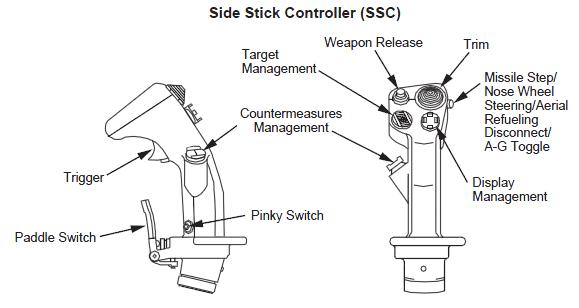
F-16 simulator side-stick controller functional allocation (for the right hand)

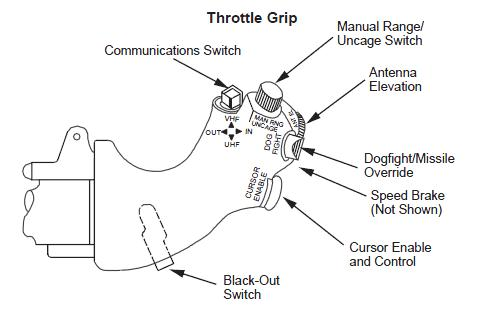
F-16 simulator throttle functional allocation (for the left hand)

HOTAS (hands on throttle-and-stick) is the concept of placing buttons and switches on the throttle lever and flight control stick in an aircraft cockpit. By adopting such an arrangement, pilots are capable of performing all vital functions as well as flying the aircraft without having to remove their hands from the controls.

The HOTAS principle has also been applied outside the aviation sector, and has made a noticeable impact upon both the road vehicle design and gaming industries.

== History ==
HOTAS was originally applied to military aircraft, starting with the British interceptor aircraft, the English Electric Lightning, in the late 1950s. The concept quickly spread to numerous other aircraft, such as the General Dynamics F-16 Fighting Falcon, IAI Super Phantom, Mikoyan MiG-29, and Eurofighter Typhoon.

In more modern implementations, it is often combined with several other input systems, such as direct voice input and helmet-mounted display, to further reduce workload upon pilots as well as the need to divide their attention between the primary controls and other systems. Apart from the cockpit, the ground control stations (GCS) used by drone operators also commonly have HOTAS principles.

== Description ==
HOTAS is a shorthand term which refers to the typical configuration of the core controls of fighter aircraft. Having all critical switches on the stick and throttle allows the pilot to keep both "hands on throttle-and-stick". Used in combination with a head-up display (HUD), the pilot can focus their attention upon flying the aircraft, manipulating sensors, and engaging targets rather than looking for controls in the cockpit. The goal is to improve pilots' situational awareness, their ability to manipulate switch and button controls in turbulence, under stress, or during high G-force maneuvers, to improve reaction time, to minimize instances when hands must be removed from one or the other of the aircraft's controls to use another aircraft system, and reduce total time spent doing so.

HOTAS enables the pilot to manipulate all the radar's important functions without taking their hands away from the stick or throttle. It is typical for several other functions to be potentially incorporated into this control arrangement; features including a radio communications switch, chaff and flare countermeasure activation, speed brake controls, nose wheel steering, and aerial refueling disconnect may be controlled as such. The precise arrangement of each aircraft's cockpit is unique, having been designed specific to mission requirements, equipment fitout, performance capabilities, and general airframe configuration of that aircraft. For instance, the F-15E Strike Eagle throttle incorporates the ability to interact with an onboard FLIR sensor.

== Applications ==
=== Aviation ===
The HOTAS concept was initially pioneered by the Royal Air Force during the 1950s. The newly-developed supersonic point-defense interceptor aircraft, the English Electric Lightning, was furnished with the Ferranti AIRPASS radar and gunsight control system, giving its pilots an earlier implementation of the practice. By 1960, Ferranti were reportedly developing such fire control systems for foreign aircraft as well. HOTAS controls have become commonplace amongst the fighter aircraft of various nations. Various aircraft flown by the United States Air Force, including the General Dynamics F-16 Fighting Falcon and the Fairchild Republic A-10 Thunderbolt II, feature such control systems.

Numerous cockpits of modern military aircraft have seen the HOTAS concept combined or enhanced by the use of further control technologies. One such example is the use of direct voice input; the combination of voice and HOTAS control schemes has sometimes been referred to as the "V-TAS" concept. A prominent fighter aircraft to be furnished with a V-TAS cockpit is the Eurofighter Typhoon. Other examples includes the Lockheed Martin F-35 Lightning II, the Dassault Rafale and the Saab JAS 39 Gripen.

Another common enhancement has been the combination of helmet mounted display (HMD) systems. These commonly allow the pilot to control various systems using his line of sight, extending even to guiding missiles by simply looking at the target. One such HMD arrangement is the Soviet "Schlem" system, which has been used on both the Mikoyan MiG-29 and Sukhoi Su-27 fighter aircraft; another is used on the F-35, which dispenses with a traditional head-up display mounted on the dashboard in favour of displaying such data via the HMD, allowing pilots to see target info regardless of the direction they are facing.

=== Road vehicles ===
Several car manufacturers have opted to integrate the HOTAS concept into the control systems of their vehicles. In the ordinary consumer market, a wide range of vehicles have had controls integrated into the steering wheel, typically for ancillary functions such as controlling the entertainment system, adjusting its cruise control and interacting with onboard computers and mobile phones. The purpose of such systems is that drivers can keep their hands upon the wheel, removing the need for the driver to look away from the road while still allowing such interactions to be performed.

Furthermore, numerous racecars have been produced with steering wheels configured to control various aspects of the car's systems, such as communications and gear shifting. Such vehicles have been frequently used in competitive racing, such as Formula One and IndyCar.

=== Gaming ===
Several game controllers have incorporated HOTAS-like control arrangements. Such controllers have been commonly used by flight simulators; one example is the Thrustmaster Warthog, which is claimed to be based on the A-10. Optional controllers for the Xbox One games console include a flight stick that has been described as having HOTAS functionality. Other gaming alternatives include hands on stick and stick (HOSAS) and hands on stick and mouse (HOSAM).

=== Remote operations ===
Several ground control stations (GCS) have used HOTAS principles amongst their control schemes. Such stations are commonly used to remotely operate unmanned aerial vehicles.

== See also ==
- Index of aviation articles
