= Adacel =

Australian software company

Adacel Technologies Limited
- Type: Public
- Founded: 1987; 39 years ago
- Headquarters: Melbourne, Australia
- Number of employees: 200+
- Website: www.adacel.com

Adacel Technologies Limited is an air traffic management company that develops and implements air traffic management systems, air traffic control simulation and training.

The company was established in 1987. Its major customers include the Federal Aviation Administration, United States Air Force, United States Department of Defense, and civil air navigation service providers.

It was suspended and delisted from the Australian Securities Exchange in January 2025.
