= Tactical bombing =

Aerial bombing aimed at targets of immediate value

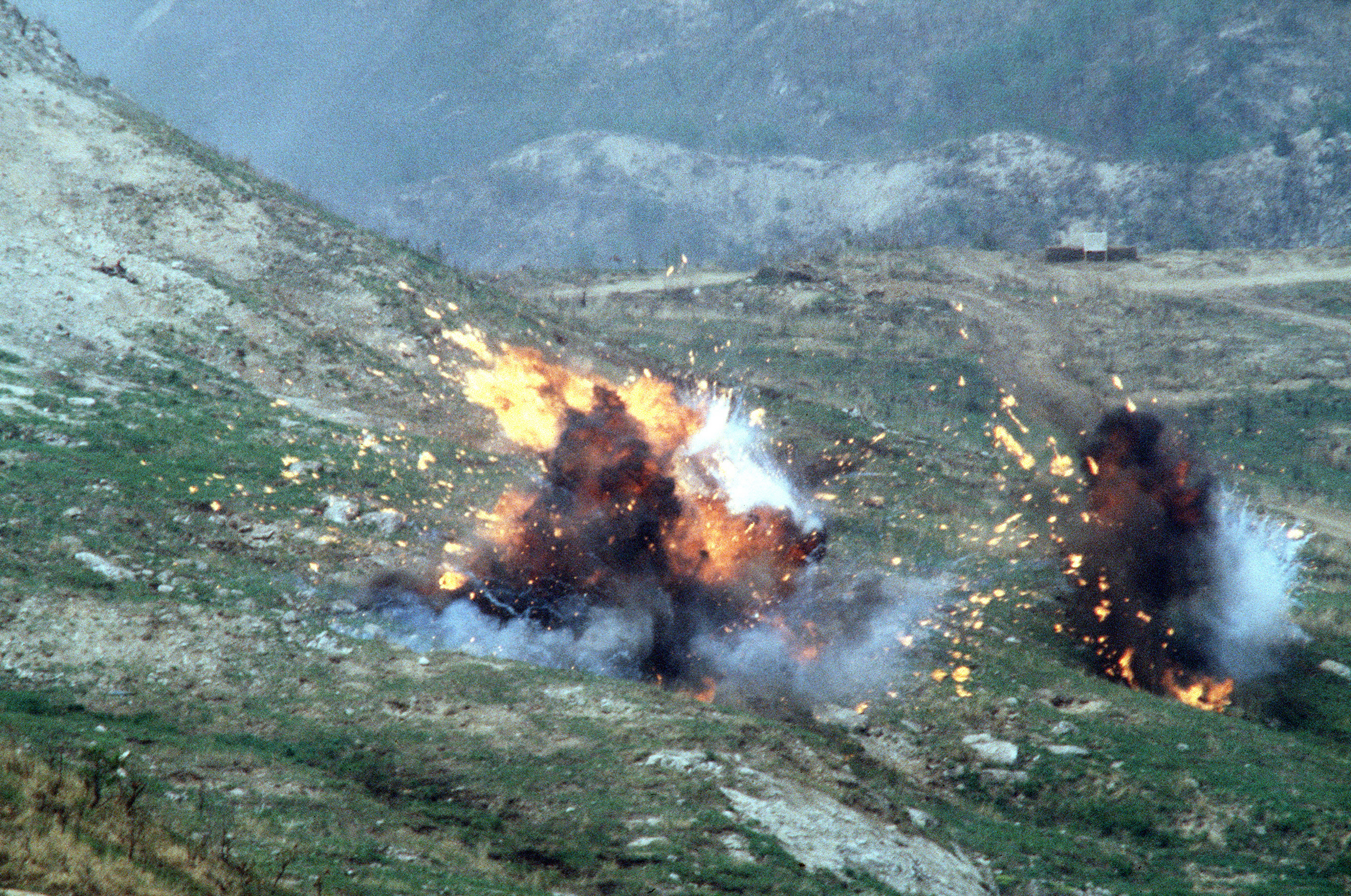
Bombing exercises conducted by South Korean F-4 Phantom II

Tactical bombing is aerial bombing aimed at targets of immediate military value, such as combatants, military installations, or military equipment. This is in contrast to strategic bombing, or attacking enemy cities and factories to cripple future military production and enemy civilians' will to support the war effort, to debilitate the enemy's long-term capacity to wage war. The term "tactical bomber" only refers to a bomber aircraft designed specifically for the primary role of tactical bombing, even though many other types of aircraft ranging from strategic bombers to fighters, interceptors, and helicopters have been used in tactical bombing operations.

Tactical bombing is employed for two primary assignments. Aircraft providing close air support attack targets in nearby proximity to friendly ground forces, acting in direct support of the ground operations (as a "flying artillery"). Air interdiction, by contrast, attacks tactical targets that are distant from or otherwise not in contact with friendly units.

== History ==
Tactical bombing was the first type of aerial bombing mission. It began in the Italo-Turkish War when pilots dropped small bombs over the side of their open cockpits onto enemy troops below. One of the earliest examples of tactical bombing was at the Battle of Neuve Chapelle in 1915 when the Royal Flying Corps dropped bombs on German rail communications. By the time of World War II a number of specialized aircraft were developed to fulfill this role, including various fighter-bombers. During the Korean War tactical bombing missions were sometimes carried out by older piston-powered fighters such as the Vought F4U Corsair. In the Vietnam War, missions were frequently directed by Forward air controllers (FACs) flying small propeller-driven planes. The FAC would mark targets with smoke, often in coordination with infantry on the ground. Bombers orbiting overhead would then fly in to hit the target.

In the modern era, precision-guided munitions ("smart bombs") can be directed with extreme accuracy. Dedicated tactical bomber aircraft types have largely been supplanted by fighter-bombers and strike aircraft.

== See also ==
- List of established military terms
- Strategic bombing
- Tactical Air Command (United States)
- Carpet bombing
- Close air support
- Forward air control
- Attack aircraft
- Suppression of Enemy Air Defenses
- Gunship
- Air interdiction
- Tank plinking
