= Tank plinking =

Military practice of using precision-guided munitions to destroy targets

Tank plinking is the military practice of using precision-guided munitions to destroy artillery, armored personnel carriers, tanks, and other targets. The term was coined by pilots during the Gulf War, but discouraged by the military. As the war progressed, the term began to encompass all forms of destroying a target with an excessively capable weapon.

General Norman Schwarzkopf was looking for a plan to incapacitate 50% of the Iraqi army before any ground invasion could begin. Planning was performed including high intensity air strikes with General Dynamics F-111, A-6 Intruder, F-15E Strike Eagle, F/A-18 Hornet, AV-8 Harrier, A-10 Thunderbolt II, and F-16 Fighting Falcon crews. This culminated in December 1990, with Operation Night Camel in which air crews of the F-111 evaluated the ability of aircraft to use guided munitions with the LANTIRN and Pave Tack target designation systems from medium altitude.

This is a deviation from standard military air engagement. Due to the prevalence of surface-to-air missiles, most aviators would prefer to engage a target from either a very high altitude, or a very low altitude, and certainly with low observability aircraft. However, the tactics used against Iraqi air defences were wildly successful, and the threat from Iraqi medium-to-high altitude SAMs was largely neutralized, allowing strike aircraft to fly high and steady without fear of getting shot down. The winning combination for the eventual campaign was either a pair or quartet of F-111F aircraft loaded with four GBU-12 500 lb (230 kg), laser-guided bombs. Bombs were designated for entrenched, hard targets, and for softer targets (e.g. armoured personnel carriers).

== See also ==
- Index of aviation articles
- List of established military terms
