= List of Harrier operators =

This is a list of operators of the Harrier family of military V/STOL aircraft, designed and built in the United Kingdom and United States of America. The members of family were Hawker Siddeley P.1127, Hawker Siddeley Harrier (AV-8A), British Aerospace Sea Harrier, McDonnell Douglas AV-8B Harrier II, and British Aerospace Harrier II. As of 2023, only the AV-8B remain in active service.

== P.1127 / prototype / evaluation aircraft operators ==
United Kingdom
Aeroplane and Armament Experimental Establishment P.1127 and Kestrel trials and evaluation
Royal Air Force

Central Fighter Establishment – Kestrel (P.1127) Evaluation Squadron (also known as the Tripartite Evaluation Squadron), nine Kestrel aircraft allocated for evaluation in 1965. One aircraft was lost in an accident, six aircraft later passed to the United States Army, one to the RAE and one to Hawker-Siddeley for further trials.
Royal Aircraft Establishment P.1127 and Kestrel trials and evaluation.

United States
United States Army

(aircrew participated in both the Tri-partite Evaluation Squadron and as part of the American XV-6A Tri-service evaluation team. Had three Kestrel aircraft allocated after the evaluation at West Raynham and also acquired the three allocated to Germany. Four later transferred to the United States Air Force and two to the National Aeronautics and Space Administration).

United States Air Force

(aircrew participated in both the Tri-partite Evaluation Squadron and as part of the American XV-6A Tri-service evaluation team but had no aircraft allocated after the evaluation at West Raynham, four former United States Army aircraft operated for trials).

United States Navy

(aircrew participated in both the Tri-partite Evaluation Squadron and as part of the American XV-6A Tri-service evaluation team but had no aircraft allocated after the evaluation).

NASA

operated two former United States Army Kestrels.

West Germany
German Air Force

(aircrew participated in the Tri-partite Evaluation Squadron, three allocated Kestrel aircraft not delivered and passed to United States Army)

== First generation Harrier operators ==
India
Indian Navy - Indian Naval Air Arm

Indian Naval Air Squadron 552

Operated the Harrier T.60 for Sea Harrier training, with two T4(I) as replacements.

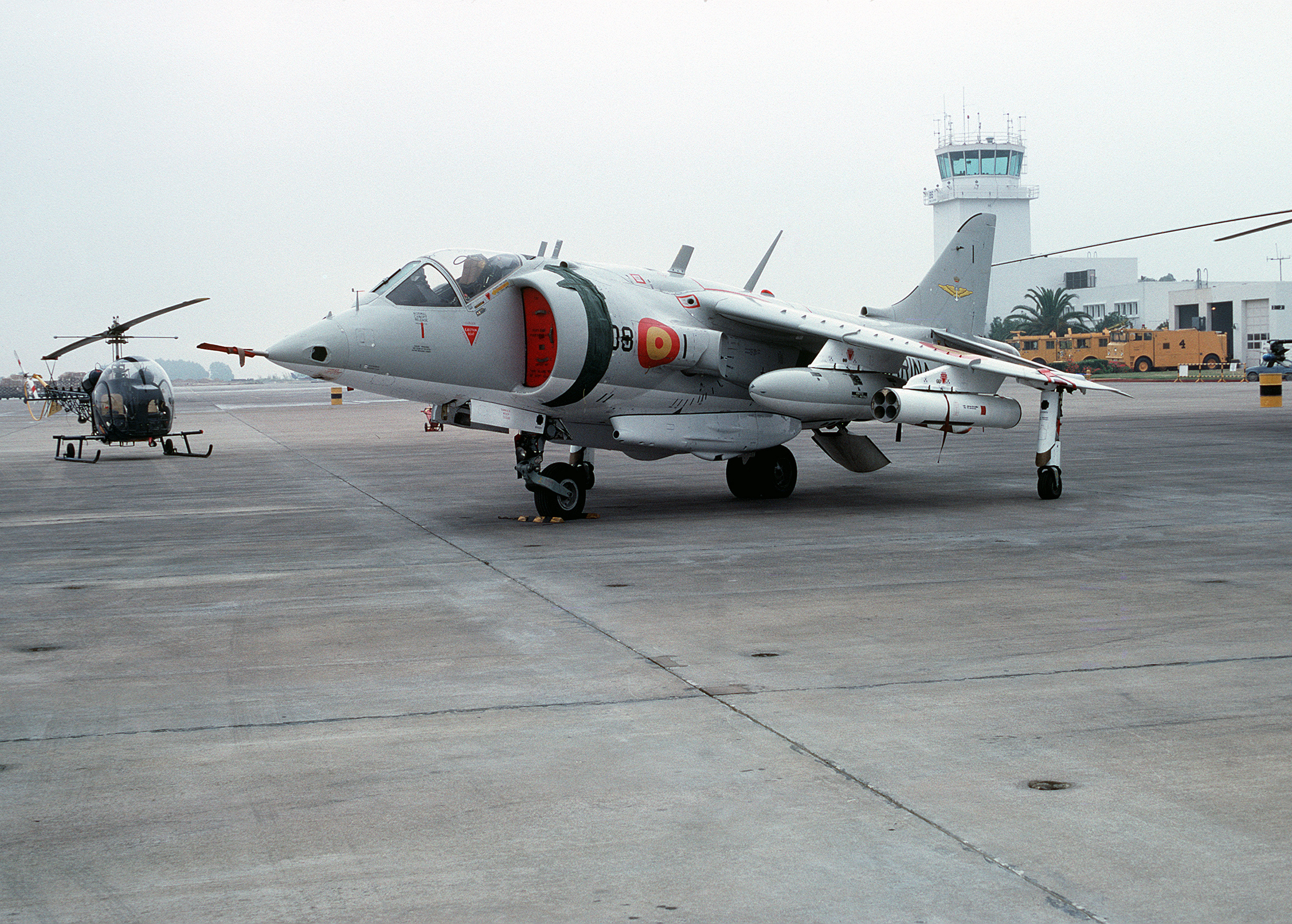
A Spanish Navy AV-8S Matador aircraft

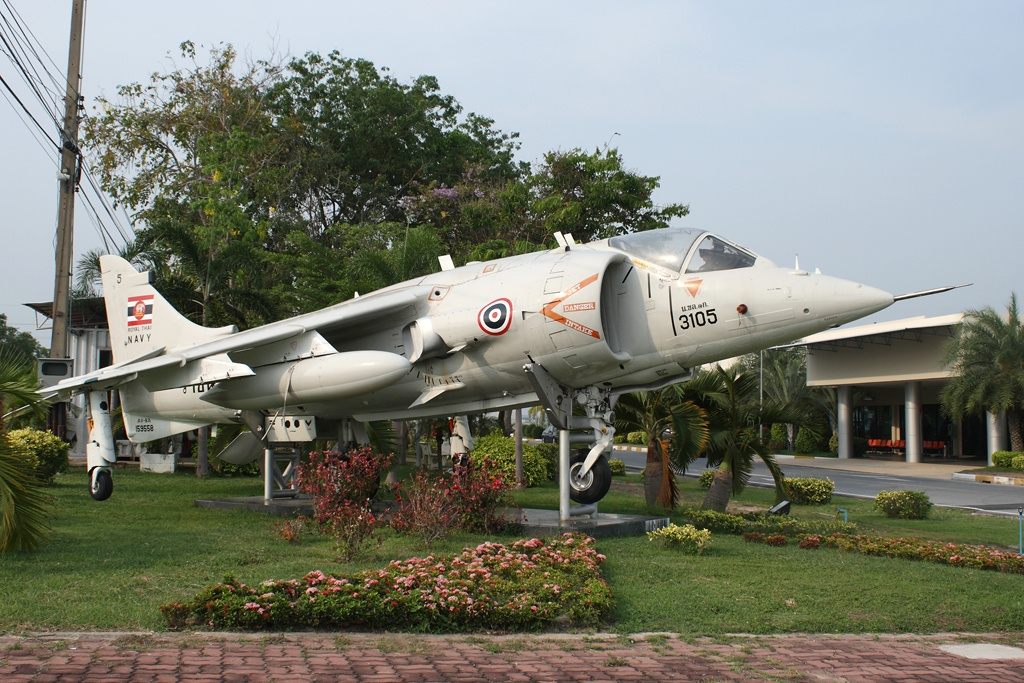
Thailand Navy AV-8S Matador

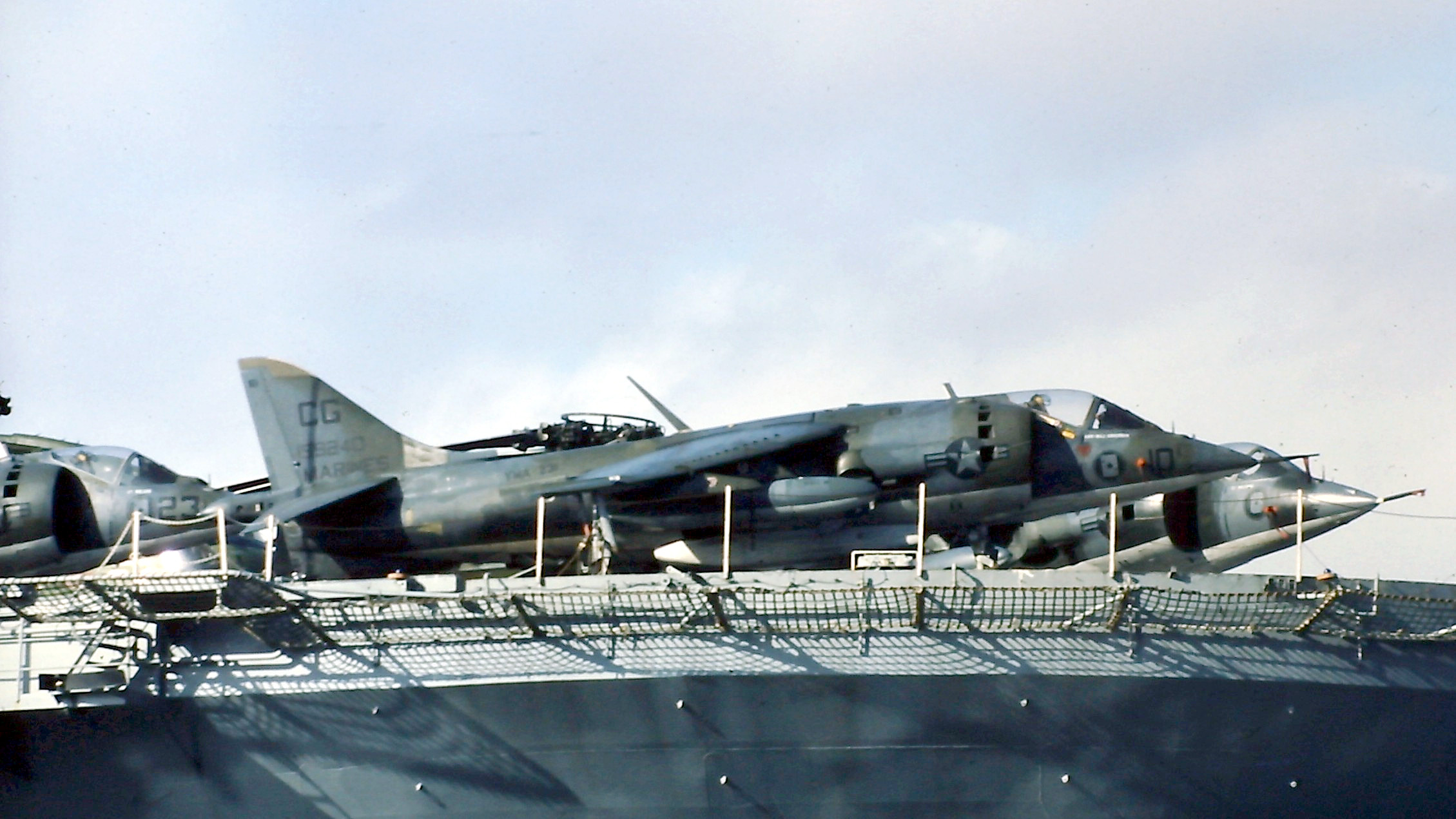
United States Marine Corps AV-8A of VMA-231 in 1980

Spain
Spanish Navy

No. 008 Escuadrilla – AV-8S and TAV-8S Matador.

Thailand
Royal Thai Navy

Squadron 1 Wing 3 (HTMS Chakri Naruebet Flying Unit) – AV-8S and TAV-8S. By 1999, only one aircraft of the 10 former Spanish aircraft received was believed to be airworthy because of lack of available spares. In 2006 the Harrier was retired from service.

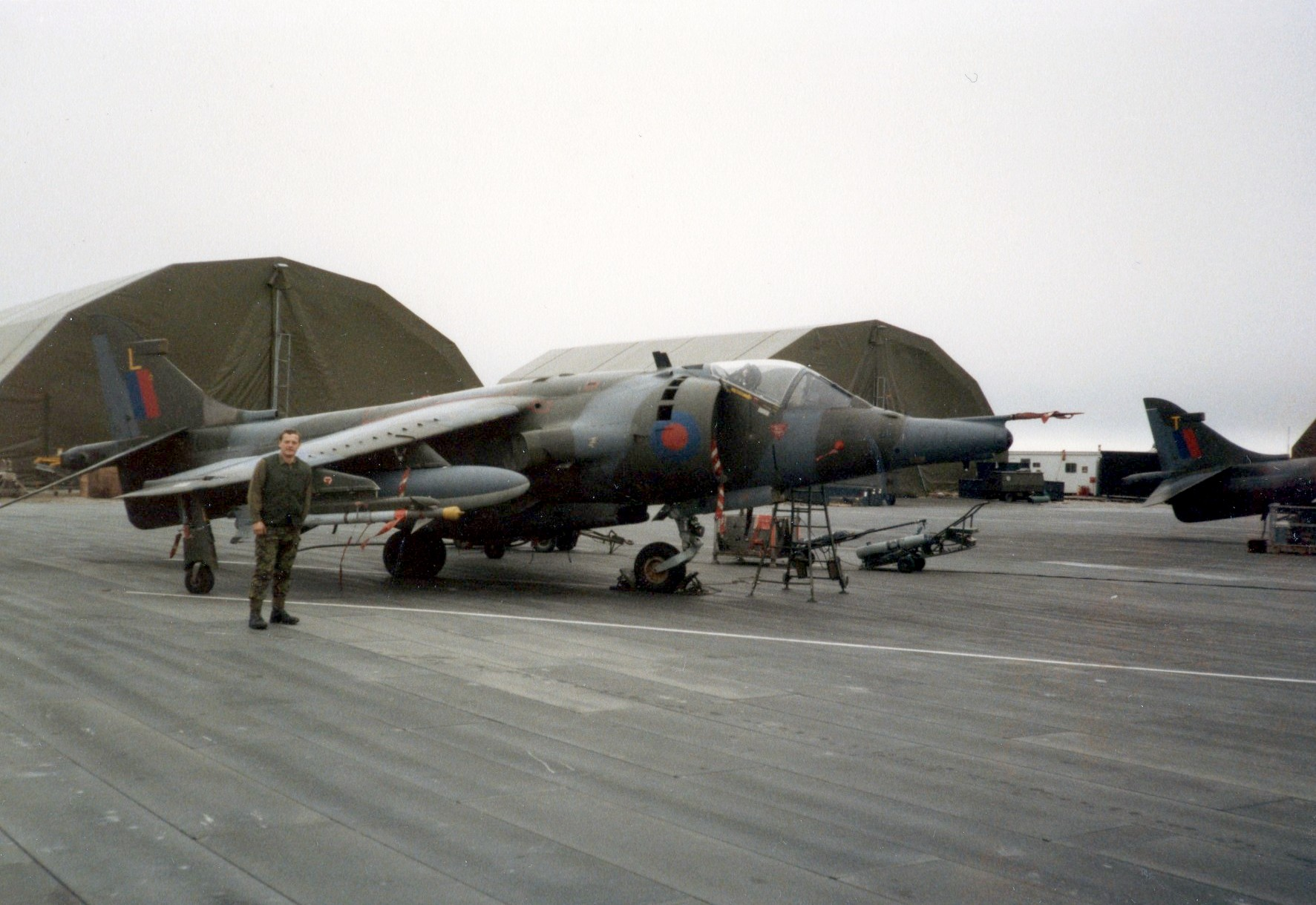
Harrier GR.3 of 1453 Flight at Stanley Airport in 1984

United Kingdom
Royal Air Force

No. 1 Squadron RAF

re-equipped with Harrier GR.1s between July and October 1969 at RAF Wittering. It started to replace its first generation Harriers with Harrier GR.5s in 1988, discarding its last GR.3 on 31 March 1989.

No. 3 Squadron RAF

formed at RAF Wildenrath with the Harrier GR.1A on 1 January 1971, moving to RAF Gütersloh in 1977. It re-equipped with Harrier GR.5s in 1989.

No. 4 Squadron RAF

converted to Harrier GR.1s at RAF Wittering in early 1970, moving to Wildenrath in Germany in June that year. It moved to RAF Gütersloh in January 1977 and replaced its GR.3s with Harrier GR.7s in 1990.

No. 20 Squadron RAF

reformed at RAF Wittering in October 1970, moving to Wildenrath later that year. It disbanded in February 1977, with its aircraft being shared between the other two Germany based squadrons.

No. 233 Operational Conversion Unit RAF

formed at Wittering from the Harrier Conversion Unit in October 1970. No 233 OCU was assigned the numberplate 20(R) Squadron in 1992, with the unit flying GR.3 until 1994 and the T.4 until 1996.

No. 1417 Flight RAF

Deployed to Belize from 1980 to 1993.

No. 1453 Flight RAF

Deployed to Stanley, in the Falkland Islands from August 1983 to June 1985.

Royal Navy - Fleet Air Arm

899 Naval Air Squadron

operated the Harrier T.4A and T.4N for training purposes for the Sea Harrier.

United States
United States Marine Corps

VMA-231

AV-8A/C Harrier. 1973–1985.

VMA-513

AV-8A/C Harrier. 1971–1986.

VMA-542

AV-8A/C Harrier. 1972–1986.

VMAT-203

Training squadron, equipped with AV-8A and TAV-8A Harrier. 1975–1987.

== Sea Harrier operators ==
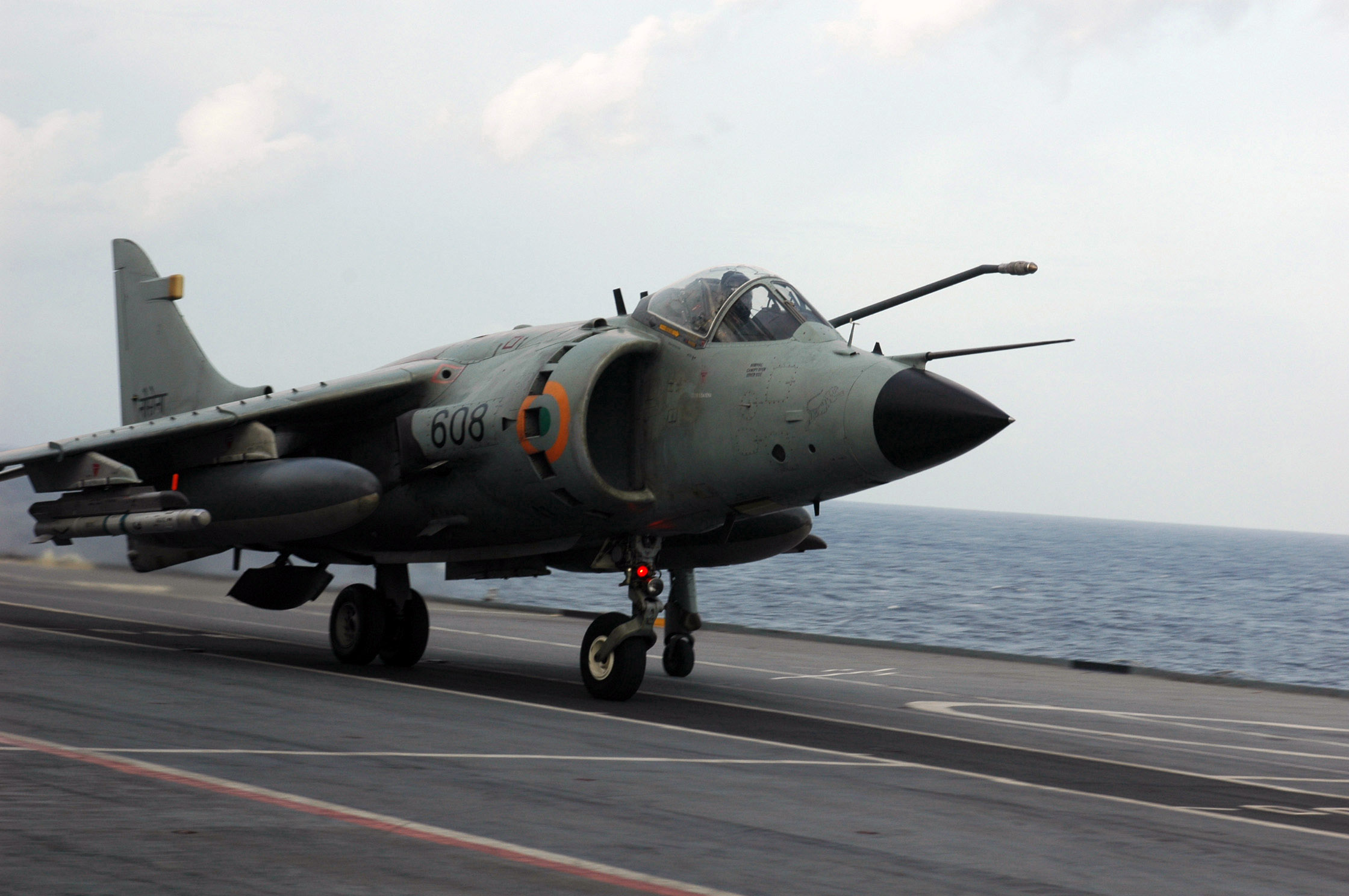
A Sea Harrier FRS.51 of INAS 300 awaiting launch clearance from INS Viraat in 2007

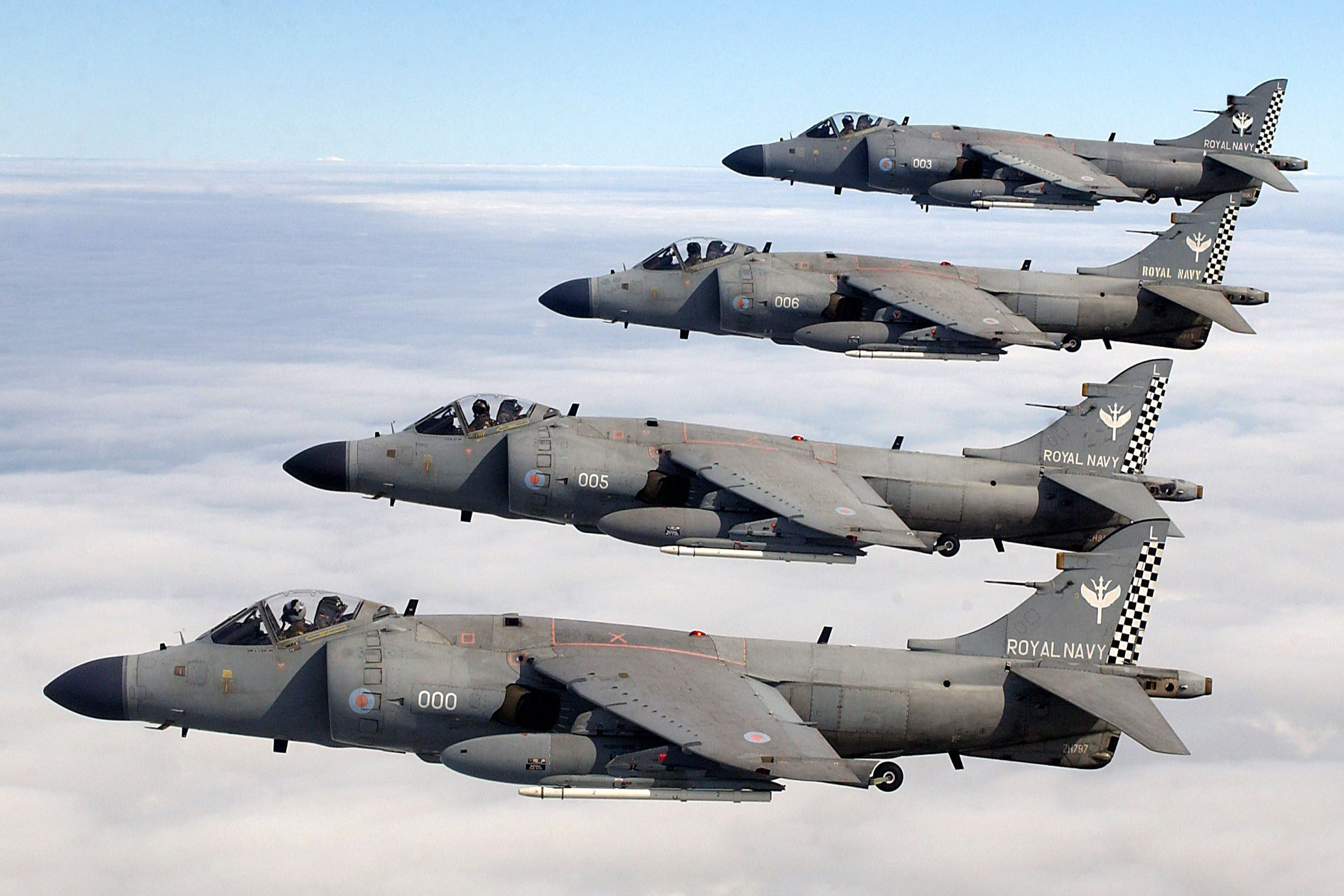
A section of four Sea Harrier FA.2s of 801 Naval Air Squadron

India
Indian Navy - Indian Naval Air Arm – Sea Harrier F.52

Indian Naval Air Squadron 300

'White Tigers'

United Kingdom
Fleet Air Arm – Sea Harrier FRS.1 and Sea Harrier F(A).2

800 Naval Air Squadron

disbanded 2006

801 Naval Air Squadron

disbanded 2006

809 Naval Air Squadron

disbanded 1982

899 Naval Air Squadron

disbanded 2006

== McDonnell Douglas AV-8B Harrier II operators ==
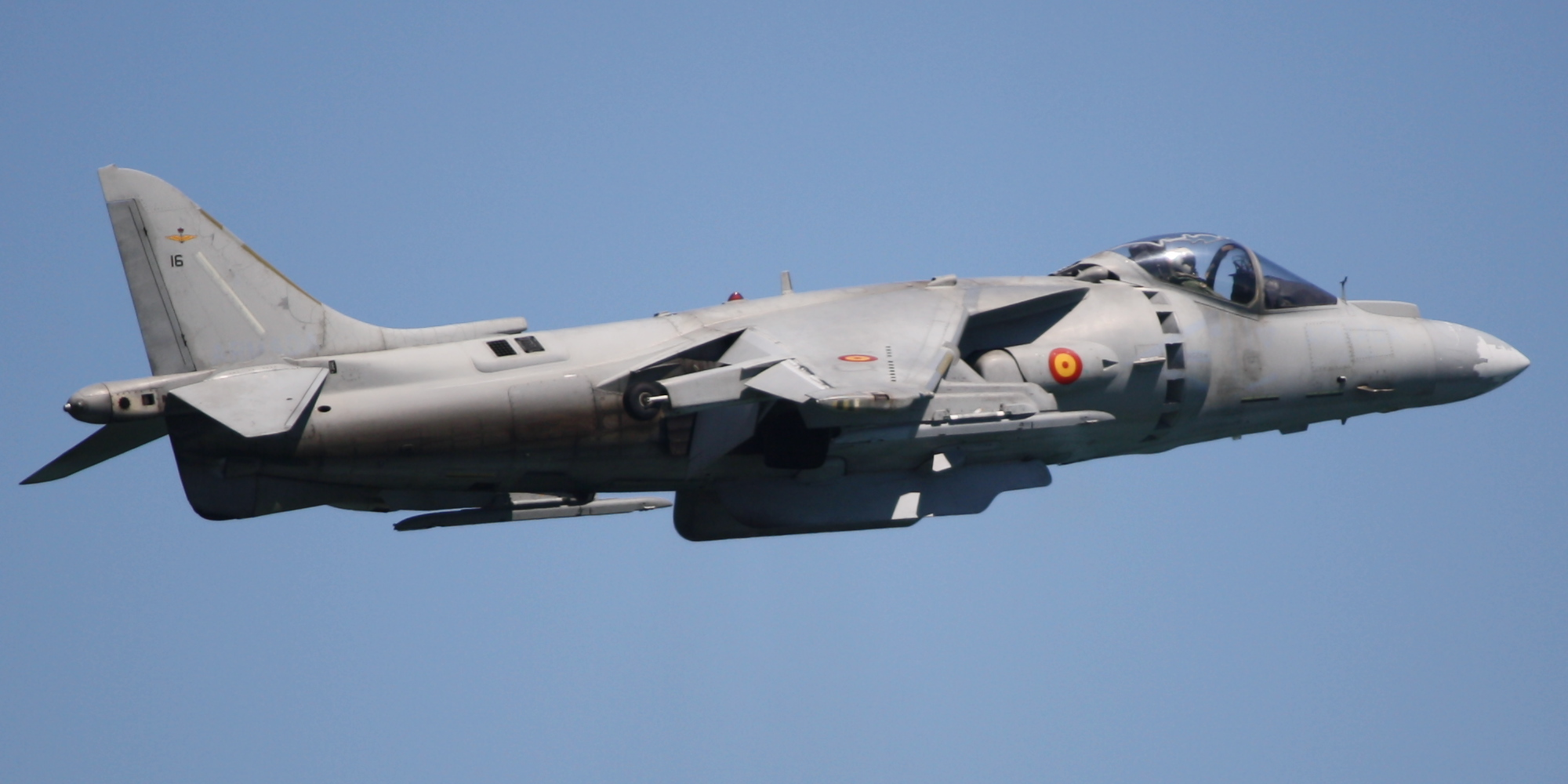
An AV-8B Plus of the Spanish Navy in 2009

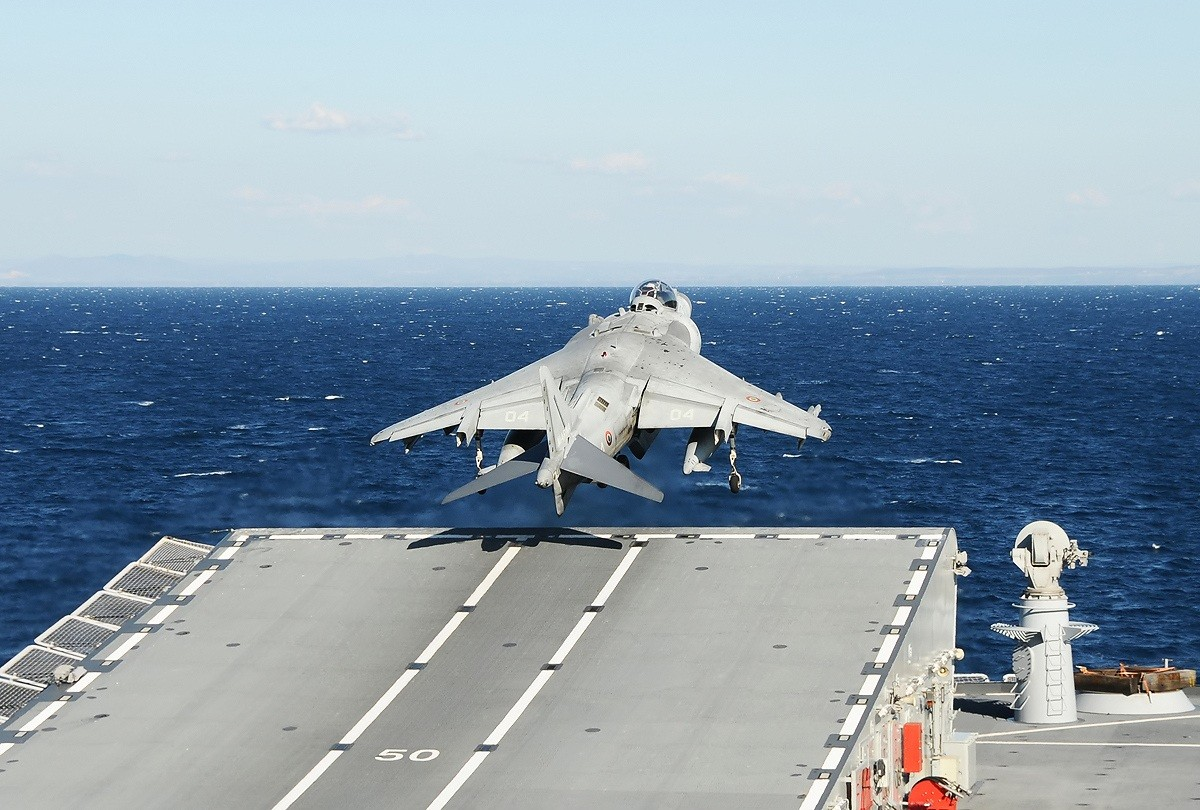
An Italian AV-8B launches from the carrier Cavour

Italy
Italian Navy

Gruppo Aerei Imbarcati

16 AV-8B Plus and 2 TAV-8B ordered; 2 AV-8B Plus lost in accidents (On 4 March 2002, respectively on 14 May 2010). 14 AV-8B Plus and 1 TAV-8B remain in service as of January 2024.

Spain
Spanish Navy

9th Squadron

12 EAV-8B ordered in 1987-88; 5 were upgraded to EAV-8B Plus and an additional 8 EAV-8B Plus were acquired; 1 EAV-8B Plus lost in an accident (On 12 April 2003). The original 1 TAV-8B was replaced by a ex-USMC TAV-8B on 3 March 2021. 12 EAV-8B Plus and 1 TAV-8B aircraft remain in service as of January.

United States
United States Marine Corps

The Marine Corps has 87 AV-8B/+ and 12 TAV-8B trainer as of Jan 2024 . Each fighter squadron operates 16 AV-8B Harrier jets. The Marine Corps currently plans to have all squadrons transitioned to or start to transition to the F-35 platform by 2026.

VMA-211 (1990-2016. Converted to F-35B)
VMA-214 (1989-2022. Converted to F-35B)
VMA-223 (1987-present. To convert to F-35B)
VMA-231 (1985-2025. To convert to F-35B in 2026)
VMA-311 (1988-2020. Converted to F-35C)
VMA-513 (1944-2013. Reactivated as VMFAT-502 in 2020. Converted to F-35B)
VMA-542 (1986-2022. Converted to F-35B)
VMAT-203 (1983-2021. Former Harrier Fleet Replacement Squadron (FRS))
VX-31

== BAE Systems Harrier II operators ==
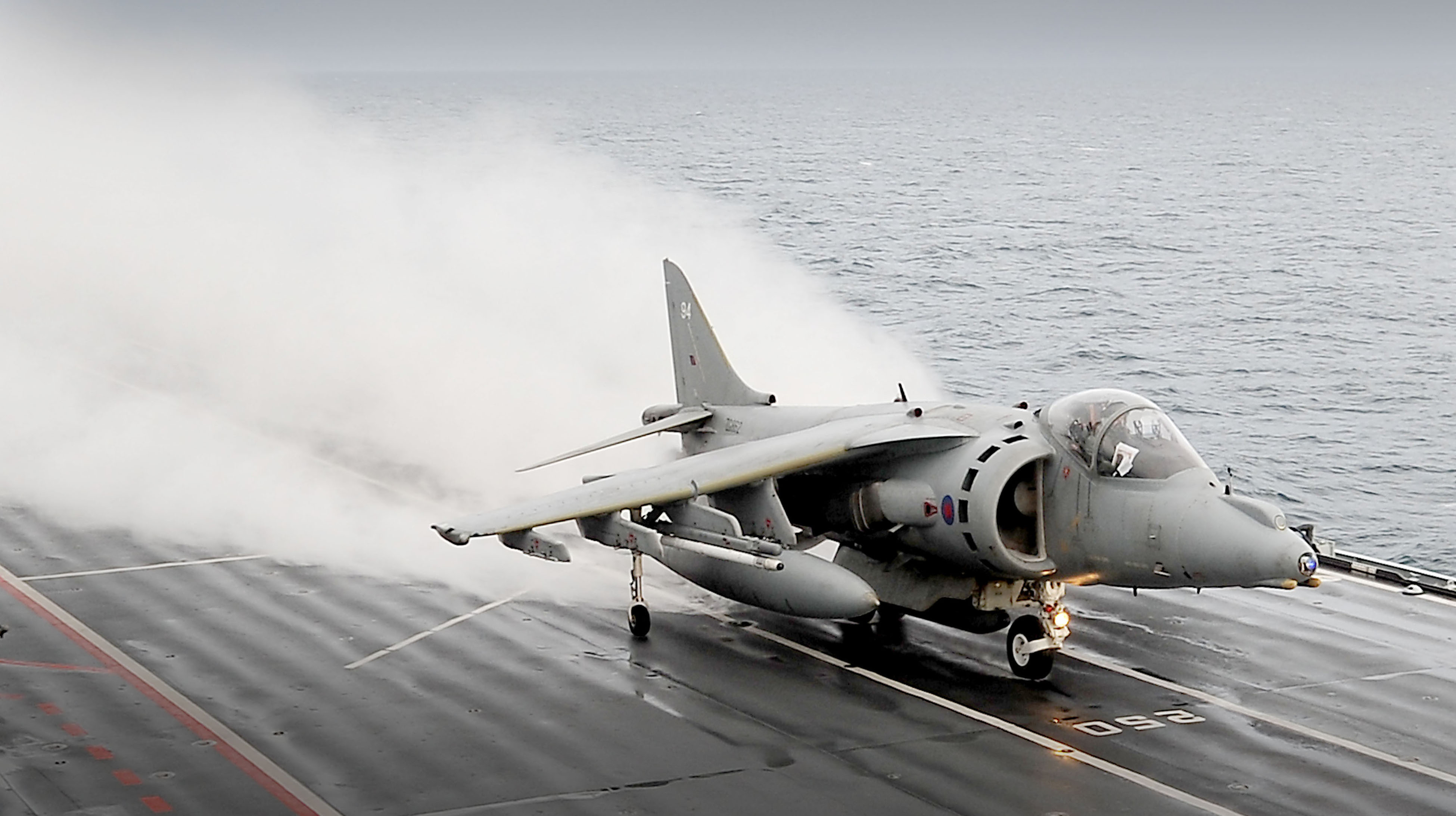
A Harrier GR.9 powers for launch from HMS Ark Royal

United Kingdom
Royal Air Force

(1989–2011) – BAE Systems Harrier II GR.5 / GR.5a / GR.7 / GR.7a / GR.9 / GR.9a / T.10 / T.12

No. 1 Squadron
No. 3 Squadron (until 2006)
No. 4 Squadron
No. 20 Squadron (until 2010)
Strike Attack Operational Evaluation Unit (SAOEU)

Royal Navy – Fleet Air Arm

BAE Systems Harrier II GR.7 / GR.7a / GR.9 / GR.9a

800 Naval Air Squadron (2006–2007, 2010)
Naval Strike Wing (2007–2010)

== See also ==
- Aircraft in fiction#Harrier family
- List of Harrier family losses
