= List of Harrier family losses =

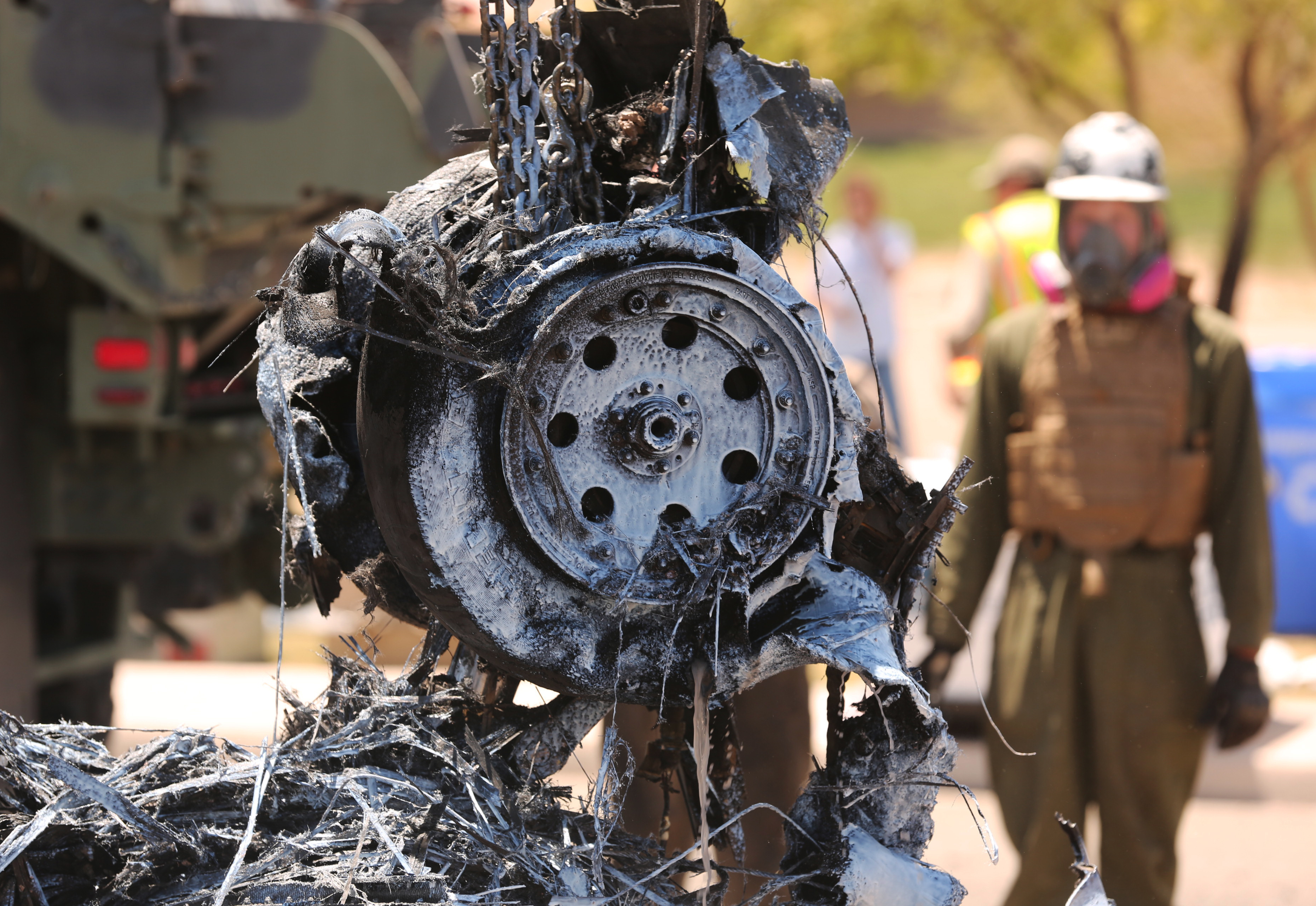
Removing debris from the AV-8B Harrier II crash near Imperial, California, in 2014

The list of Harrier family aircraft losses covers each incident in which a Harrier was destroyed or otherwise written off due to damage sustained.

== List of losses ==
Date	Operator	Variant	ID	Description
12 July 1961	United Kingdom Hawker Siddeley	P.1127	XP976	Flown by test pilot Hugh Merewether, was damaged after a main bearing failure and resultant fire warning caused an emergency landing to be made at RAF Tangmere, Sussex. Landing heavily, the aircraft burst into flames. Merewether got out unhurt but the aircraft was badly damaged. Bearing failure caused compressor disintegration, the fragments creating a hole in the compressor casing.
14 December 1961	United Kingdom Hawker Siddeley	P.1127	XP836	Crashed after a cold nozzle detached in flight and the aircraft became uncontrollable during approach to normal horizontal landing. Pilot Bill Bedford ejected unhurt. Aircraft hit a barn and caught fire.
30 November 1962	United Kingdom Hawker Siddeley	P.1127	XP972	Written off after belly landing at RAF Tangmere.
16 June 1963	United Kingdom Hawker Siddeley	P.1127	XP831	Crashed while flying at low speed and low altitude during a display at the 1963 Paris Air Show, pilot Bill Bedford climbed from the aircraft unhurt. Crash was caused by a speck of dust in a nozzle-control air motor which caused momentary failure of the nozzles to follow pilot's commands while the aircraft was being mostly supported by engine lift.
1 April 1965	(United Kingdom) (Germany) (United States) Tripartite Evaluation Squadron	Kestrel FGA1	XS696	Crashed on take-off at RAF West Raynham, but did not catch fire, although blanketed by foam as a precaution.
21 September 1967	(United Kingdom) (Germany) (United States) Tripartite Evaluation Squadron	Kestrel FGA1	XS693	Abandoned 2 miles (3.2 km) from Boscombe Down.
27 January 1969	Royal Air Force	Harrier GR1	XV743	Crashed on takeoff from Dunsfold Aerodrome after loss of control. United States Air Force Major C. R. Rosburg was killed during ejection.
4 June 1969	(United Kingdom) Aeroplane and Armament Experimental Establishment	Harrier T2	XW174	Engine failure during delivery flight near Boscombe Down. Duncan M. S. Simpson, a Hawker Siddeley test pilot was injured during ejection.
11 July 1970	(United Kingdom) Aeroplane and Armament Experimental Establishment	Harrier T2	XW264	Written off after forced landing at Boscombe Down due to engine failure. Pilot survived with minor injuries.
6 October 1970	(United Kingdom) No. 1 Squadron RAF	Harrier GR1	XV796	Crashed after engine flameout at Ouston. Flight Lieutenant Neil Wharton ejected safely.
23 April 1971	(United Kingdom) No. 20 Squadron RAF	Harrier GR1	XV798	Written off after heavy landing at RAF Wildenrath, West Germany; pilot ejected safely.
18 June 1971	(United States) VMA-513	AV-8A Harrier	158386	Crashed into the Chesapeake Bay during a test flight; Major Michael J. Ripley did not eject and became the first serviceman killed in a Harrier crash in the United States.
3 August 1971	(United Kingdom) No. 1 Squadron RAF	Harrier GR1	XV803	Flew into ground following nozzle failure at RAF Wattisham; United States Air Force Captain Louis V. Distelzwieg Jr. did not eject and was killed.
12 January 1972	(United Kingdom) No. 3 Squadron RAF	Harrier GR1	XW918	Crashed following loss of control in cloud at Tuschenbroich, West Germany during a display flight for Swiss officials; Flight Lieutenant Christopher Maunder Humphrey was killed during ejection.
21 March 1972	(United Kingdom) Royal Air Force	Harrier GR1	XV802	Flew into ground near Stadtoldendorf, West Germany; Flight Lieutenant Peter Anthony did not eject and was killed.
26 April 1972	(United Kingdom) Royal Air Force	Harrier GR1	XV749	Crashed off the Lincolnshire coast following a bird strike, Flight Lieutenant J. Marshall ejected safely.
3 May 1972	(United Kingdom) No. 1 Squadron RAF	Harrier GR1	XV777	Loss of control during transition from hover at RAF Wittering; Flying Officer C. J. E. Adams ejected safely.
4 May 1972	(United Kingdom) No. 4 Squadron RAF	Harrier GR1	XV794	Crashed after bird strike near Hutten, West Germany; Air Commodore Peter Taylor ejected safely.
20 June 1972	(United Kingdom) No. 3 Squadron RAF	Harrier GR3	XW920	Engine flame out over Sardinia due to fuel supply failure, Flight Lieutenant James Downey ejected safely.
27 June 1972	(United Kingdom) No. 4 Squadron RAF	Harrier GR1	XV780	Crashed after engine fire near RAF Gutersloh, West Germany due to bird strike; Wing Commander McKee ejected safely.
12 September 1972	(United Kingdom) No. 233 OCU RAF	Harrier GR1	XV799	Flew into hill near Kyle of Lochalsh, Scotland after loss of control; Group Captain Jeremy Thorndike Hall did not eject and was killed.
27 March 1973	(United States) VMA-513	AV-8A Harrier	158388	Crashed after bird strike at MCAS Beaufort; Major R. E. O'Dare ejected safely.
10 April 1973	(United Kingdom) Hawker Siddeley	Harrier GR1	XV276	Crashed after engine failure near Dunsfold; Swiss Air Force Lieutenant Colonel H. Stauffer ejected safely.
9 July 1973	(United Kingdom) No. 20 Squadron RAF	Harrier GR3	XV791	Crashed on takeoff after bird strike at RAF Wildenrath; Squadron Leader P. G. Sturt ejected.
30 July 1973	(United Kingdom) Royal Air Force	Harrier GR3	XV805	Crashed after engine failure near Coesfeld, West Germany; USMC Major J. Gibson ejected.
6 September 1973	(United Kingdom) No. 20 Squadron RAF	Harrier GR3	XV750	Crashed due to engine failure over Roermond, Netherlands; pilot ejected safely.
24 September 1973	(United Kingdom) No. 1 Squadron RAF	Harrier GR1	XV739	Crashed due to loss of control during transition near Episkopi, Cyprus; Flight Lieutenant Hulley ejected but suffered a broken leg.
23 January 1974	(United Kingdom) No. 4 Squadron RAF	Harrier GR1	XV739	Crashed due to fuel pump failure near Vredepeel, Netherlands; Flight Lieutenant Gorden Revell was killed during ejection due to parachute harness failure.
26 March 1974	(United Kingdom) No. 4 Squadron RAF	Harrier GR3	XV785	Crashed due to loss of control during landing at RAF Wildenrath; Flight Lieutenant Andrew Robby Bloxham was killed during ejection.
16 May 1974	(United Kingdom) Royal Air Force	Harrier GR3	XV800	Damaged beyond repair following bird strike at RAF Wildenrath.
5 June 1974	(United States) VMA-542	AV-8A Harrier	158948	Rolled during landing at Marine Corps Base Camp Lejeune, North Carolina; Captain Richard H. Briggs did not eject and was killed.
5 June 1974	(United States) VMA-231	AV-8A Harrier	159234	Crashed near MCAS Cherry Point.
27 July 1974	(United States) VMA-513	AV-8A Harrier	158971	Crashed during an air show hovering demonstration at General Mitchell Airport in Milwaukee, WI causing the aircraft to burst into flames; Captain S. C. Torrent ejected but was injured.
9 October 1974	(United States) VMA-231	AV-8A Harrier	159245	Crashed on landing due to landing gear collapse at Marine Corps Air Station Cherry Point, North Carolina; Captain Roy R. Dougherty ejected but was killed.
13 February 1975	United States Marine Corps	AV-8A Harrier	159235	Crashed on takeoff due to mechanical failure at Marine Corps Air Station Cherry Point, North Carolina; Captain Richard F. Davis did not eject and was killed.
9 April 1975	(United Kingdom) No. 1 Squadron RAF	Harrier GR3	XV776	Crashed due to engine failure near Ditton Priors, Shropshire; Flight Lieutenant J. Buckler ejected but sustained minor injuries.
16 May 1975	(United Kingdom) No. 4 Squadron RAF	Harrier GR3	XV800	Crashed due to bird ingestion near RAF Wildenrath; pilot ejected.
3 July 1975	(United States) VMA-231	AV-8A Harrier	159244	Crashed due to engine failure near MCAS Beaufort; Major Woody F. Gilliland ejected safely.
3 July 1975	(United States) VMA-231	AV-8A Harrier	159236	Flew into the ground while trying to help locate a fellow pilot who had just successfully ejected; Captain Cleve B. Doster did not eject and was killed.
1 December 1975	(United Kingdom) No. 1417 Flight RAF	Harrier GR3	XV788	Crashed due to bird ingestion near Belize City; Flying Officer B. C. Scott ejected and suffered minor injuries.
10 January 1976	(United States) VMA-542	AV-8A Harrier	158709	Crashed during landing at NAS Jacksonville; Captain R. B. Pevey ejected safely.
19 January 1976	(United Kingdom) No. 233 OCU RAF	Harrier GR3	XV745	Collided with XV754 during ground attack exercises in Cheshire, England; Flight Lieutenant James Edward Downey did not eject and was killed.
19 January 1976	(United Kingdom) No. 233 OCU RAF	Harrier GR3	XV754	Collided with XV745 during ground attack exercises in Cheshire, England; Flight Lieutenant John Keith Roberts attempted to eject but was killed.
12 March 1976	(United Kingdom) Royal Air Force	Harrier GR3	XV746	Flew into mountain in Norway; Flight Lieutenant Stephen David Wakely was killed during ejection.
11 June 1976	(Spain) Spanish Navy	EAV-8A Matador	008-2	Crashed at Whiteman AFB (USA) on take-off, pilot ejected.
16 June 1976	(United States) VMA-231	AV-8A Harrier	159237	Crashed at sea due to engine failure; Captain E. B. Cummings ejected safely.
6 July 1976	(United Kingdom) No. 3 Squadron RAF	Harrier GR3	XW770	Crashed due to engine failure near Borken, West Germany; Flight Lieutenant Kirton ejected safely.
27 August 1976	(United States) VMA-542	AV-8A Harrier	158957	Crashed due to engine failure on approach to MCAS Cherry Point; Captain J. W. Cox ejected safely.
30 August 1976	(United States) VMA-513	AV-8A Harrier	158974	Crashed due to fuel starvation on approach to MCAS Iwakuni; Captain A. A. Decandia ejected safely.
6 December 1976	(United States) VMA-513	AV-8A Harrier	159230	Crashed into the Sea of Japan during a training flight; Captain Donald P. Kaltenbaugh was killed.
11 February 1977	(United States) VMA-542	AV-8A Harrier	158967	Crashed due to engine failure near NAS Fallon; Captain Gary Bain ejected safely.
19 March 1977	(United States) VMAT-203	AV-8A Harrier	159377	Crashed during transition at MCAS Cherry Point; pilot ejected safely.
6 April 1977	(United States) VMAT-203	AV-8A Harrier	159372	Crashed during transition with heavy crosswinds at MCAS Beaufort; pilot did not eject and was killed.
12 July 1977	(United States) VMA-231	AV-8A Harrier	159250	Crashed into the Atlantic during a demonstration for several high-ranking government officials, including Navy Secretary Graham Claytor Jr. and Bert Lance, then director of the Office of Management and Budget who were observing from the carrier Saratoga; Captain Timothy C. Krepps did not eject and was killed.
27 July 1977	(United States) VMA-542	AV-8A Harrier	158953	Crashed into the Bay River in the rain and exploded; Captain Anthony Franovich, Jr. did not eject and was killed.
25 August 1977	(United States) VMA-542	AV-8C Harrier	158707	Written off due to damage suffered in a crash at MCAS Cherry Point; pilot ejected safely.
6 September 1977	(United States) VMA-513	AV-8A Harrier	158970	Flew into a mountainside during a bombing training run at Nellis Air Force Base, Nevada; Captain Charles G. Reed did not eject and was killed.
25 October 1977	(United Kingdom) No. 233 OCU RAF	Harrier GR3	XV804	Written off due to damage from an emergency landing at RAF Spitalgate.
27 November 1977	(United States) VMA-231	AV-8A Harrier	159259	Written off due to damage from a crash at MCAS Cherry Point; pilot ejected safely.
29 November 1977	(United States) VMA-231	AV-8A Harrier	158708	Crashed at sea due to engine failure near Kadena Air Base; pilot ejected safely.
1 February 1978	(United States) VMA-542	AV-8A Harrier		Crashed due to engine failure near NAS Fallon; pilot ejected safely but sustained slight injuries.
3 February 1978	(United States) VMA-542	AV-8A Harrier		Crashed due to engine failure near MCAS Cherry Point; pilot ejected safely but sustained slight injuries.
2 October 1978	(United States) VMA-513	AV-8C Harrier	158960	Flew into the ground inverted in the Chocolate Mountains east of California's Salton Sea during a bombing training run; Captain Joseph Gallo was killed.
6 October 1978	(United States) VMA-513	AV-8C Harrier	158961	Crashed due to fire warning near MCAS Yuma; pilot ejected safely.
15 December 1978	(United Kingdom) No. 3 Squadron RAF	Harrier GR3	XV801	Crashed due to loss of control near Ennigerich, West Germany; pilot ejected.
12 June 1979	(United Kingdom) No. 3 Squadron RAF	Harrier GR3	XV781	Crashed due to engine fire on approach to RAF Gutersloh; Flight Lieutenant T. R. Watts ejected safely.
18 July 1979	(United Kingdom) No. 4 Squadron RAF	Harrier GR3	XZ137	Hit a house at Wissmar, West Germany; USMC Captain Thomas Pasquale was killed.
21 September 1979	(United Kingdom) No. 1 Squadron RAF	Harrier GR3	XV757	Crashed due to collision with XZ128 over Wisbech, Isle of Ely, Cambridgeshire; Wing Commander R. B. Duckett ejected safely.
21 September 1979	(United Kingdom) No. 1 Squadron RAF	Harrier GR3	XZ128	Crashed due to collision with XV757 over Wisbech, Isle of Ely, Cambridgeshire; Flight Lieutenant Chris J. Gowers ejected safely. The aircraft struck a house, killing three people and injuring several others on the ground.
4 October 1979	(United Kingdom) Royal Air Force	Harrier GR3	XW766	Crashed due to bird ingestion near Ravensberg, West Germany; Flight Lieutenant C. C. N. Burwell ejected.
10 October 1979	United States Marine Corps	AV-8A Harrier		Lifted off about 100' and dropped into the aluminum runway at EAF Twentynine Palms, MCAGCC Twentynine Palms; pilot went down with aircraft but suffered only a broken nose.
12 October 1979	(United States) VMA-542	AV-8C Harrier	158694	Crashed into the sea near Cape Lookout, North Carolina. 1st Lieutenant Robert C. Murray did not eject and his body was never recovered.
8 November 1979	(United Kingdom) No. 1 Squadron RAF	Harrier GR3	XV756	Crashed due to ricochet damage over Holbeach Air Weapons Range; Royal New Zealand Air Force Flight Lieutenant Boyens ejected.
12 March 1980	(United Kingdom) No. 3 Squadron RAF	Harrier GR3	XW765	Crashed due to bird strike over Dyfed, Wales; Flight Lieutenant Paul Barton ejected safely.
13 March 1980	United States Marine Corps	AV-8A Harrier		Pilot was killed after he flew into a 200-foot-thick cloud at the start of a short trip back to base at Cherry Point, North Carolina, when his AV-8A Harrier simply went into the water without explanation.
1 May 1980	United States Marine Corps	AV-8A Harrier		Pilot was killed during a vertical takeoff at Cherry Point, North Carolina. Considered one of the most spectacular crashes in Harrier history, his plane rolled, dropped to the runway, bounced into a ditch, burst into flames, flipped, slid through a hangar and into a parking lot, where it damaged 20 vehicles – without explanation.
28 May 1980	(Spain) Spanish Navy	EAV-8A Matador	008-1	Crashed, unreported location
1 August 1980	(United States) VMAT-203	TAV-8A Harrier	159384	Crashed near Gloucester, North Carolina; 1st Lieutenant Charles C. Vaden and Major Russell S. Michaelson ejected safely.
13 August 1980	(United States) VMA-513	AV-8A Harrier	159251	Written off; also reported as crashed 6 September 1979.
5 September 1980	(United States) McDonnell Douglas	YAV-8C Harrier	158384	Crashed into the sea near San Diego, California.
14 October 1980	(United Kingdom) No. 3 Squadron RAF	Harrier GR3	XV792	Rolled over and crashed while in the hover at RAF Gutersloh due to fatigue in a control rod from the starboard aileron to the starboard roll reaction shutter. Pilot ejected at ~100 ft with aircraft in 80–90-degree of bank but seat was outside its performance envelope and the pilot was killed.
28 October 1980	(United Kingdom) No. 4 Squadron RAF	Harrier GR3	XV761	Crashed due to a bird strike while engaged in air combat maneuvers; pilot ejected but suffered minor injuries.
1 December 1980	(United Kingdom) Royal Navy	Sea Harrier FRS1	XZ454	Hit ramp of HMS Invincible with starboard outrigger after attempting to hover with full fuel carrying BBC cameras. Lieutenant Commander M. Blisset ejected but suffered minor injuries.
19 January 1981	United States Marine Corps	AV-8A Harrier		Crashed due to loss of control during take off at MCAS Cherry Point; Colonel John H. Ditto did not eject and was killed. He was the new commanding officer and wanted to be familiar with every plane under his new command. Investigation concluded that he had stayed with the plane too long trying to save it and had ejected too late.
22 May 1981	(United Kingdom) No. 3 Squadron RAF	Harrier GR3	XZ139	Pilot ejected near Sogel, West Germany after tailplane control rod disconnected.
26 May 1981	(United Kingdom) No. 1417 Flight RAF	Harrier GR3	XW923	Wreckage recovery Crashed into the Belize River due to loss of control during vertical takeoff at Belize Airport; Flight Lieutenant James Mardon ejected safely.
26 June 1981	(United States) VMA-513	AV-8A Harrier	158703	Flew into the sea during a demonstration flight being viewed by the amphibious assault ship, Tarawa. On the second pass his AV-8A Harrier narrowly missed the ship and went into the water without explanation. Major Thomas W. Tyler did not eject and was killed. Given his extensive experience with the craft, investigators decided that the presence of his fiancé on the Tarawa somehow caused the crash.
14 July 1981	(United Kingdom) No. 1417 Flight RAF	Harrier GR3	XV807	Flew into tree near Georgeville, Belize; Flight Lieutenant John Clark did not eject and was killed.
25 August 1981	(United Kingdom) No. 3 Squadron RAF	Harrier GR3	XZ139	Crashed due to mechanical failure near Ahlhorn, West Germany; Flight Lieutenant Mike D. Beech ejected safely.
3 December 1981	(United States) VMA-513	AV-8A Harrier	158704	Crashed during a practice bombing run near Twentynine Palms; Captain Jeffrey C. Fishbaugh was killed. Investigation was inconclusive, but he had previously reported/complained that the radar altimeter was inoperative.
26 January 1982	(United States) VMA-513	AV-8A Harrier	158968	Crashed during an emergency landing attempt at Yuma, Arizona; Lieutenant Charles E. Simpson did not eject and was killed. There was a fuel tank imbalance (2800 pounds on left, 1200 pounds on right). That AV-8A had experienced fuel tank problems twice previously, but the mechanical problem had not been properly resolved before this flight.
12 February 1982	(United Kingdom) No. 233 OCU RAF	Harrier GR3	XZ973	Crashed due to loss of control near Corwen, Wales; United States Navy Lieutenant John MacBeth did not eject and was killed.
4 March 1982	(United States) VMA-542	AV-8A Harrier	158956	Crashed due to undetermined causes during landing at Cherry Point, North Carolina; 1st Lieutenant Robert G. Wilson, Jr. was killed during ejection.
4 May 1982	(United Kingdom) 800 Naval Air Squadron	Sea Harrier FRS1	XZ450	Shot down by Argentine 35 mm Skyguard anti-aircraft fire near Goose Green, Falkland Islands; Lieutenant Nick Taylor was killed.
6 May 1982	(United Kingdom) 801 Naval Air Squadron	Sea Harrier FRS1	XZ452	Lost at sea due to presumed collision with XZ453 in poor visibility while on combat air patrol from HMS Invincible of the Falklands task force, Lieutenant Commander E. John Eyton-Jones missing and presumed killed.
6 May 1982	(United Kingdom) 801 Naval Air Squadron	Sea Harrier FRS1	XZ453	Lost at sea due to presumed collision with XZ452 in poor visibility while on combat air patrol from HMS Invincible of the Falklands task force, Lieutenant A. Curtis missing and presumed killed.
17 May 1982	(United Kingdom) Aeroplane & Armament Experimental Establishment	Sea Harrier FRS1	XZ438	Crashed due to loss of control during take off from RNAS Yeovilton; Royal Navy Lieutenant Commander D. Poole did not eject and was killed.
21 May 1982	(United Kingdom) No. 1 Squadron RAF	Harrier GR3	XZ972	Shot down by a Blowpipe missile during an armed reconnaissance over Port Howard in the Falkland Islands; Flight Lieutenant Jeff Glover ejected safely and was captured by Argentine forces.
23 May 1982	(United Kingdom) 800 Naval Air Squadron	Sea Harrier FRS1	ZA192	Exploded in mid-air after take off from HMS Hermes; Commander Gordon W. J. Batt did not eject and was killed.
27 May 1982	(United Kingdom) No. 1 Squadron RAF	Harrier GR3	XZ988	Shot down by Argentine anti-aircraft gunner Ramon Garcés using an RH 20 mm cannon near Goose Green, Falkland Islands; Squadron Leader Bob Iveson was injured during ejection but evaded capture and was rescued.
29 May 1982	(United Kingdom) 801 Naval Air Squadron	Sea Harrier FRS1	ZA174	Slid into the sea from the deck of HMS Invincible in bad weather, pilot ejected.
30 May 1982	(United Kingdom) No. 1 Squadron RAF	Harrier GR3	XZ963	Crashed into the sea due to fuel exhaustion attempting to return to HMS Hermes after being hit by small arms fire west of Port Stanley, Falkland Islands; Squadron Leader Jerry J. Pook ejected safely and was rescued.
1 June 1982	(United Kingdom) 809 Naval Air Squadron	Sea Harrier FRS1	XZ456	Shot down by an Argentine Roland missile near Stanley Airport in the Falkland Islands; Flight Lieutenant Ian Mortimer ejected safely and was rescued.
8 June 1982	(United Kingdom) No. 1 Squadron RAF	Harrier GR3	XZ989	Damaged beyond repair during a hard landing on a metal strip runway at San Carlos, Falkland Islands; Wing Commander Peter Squire vacated safely after the landing.
29 June 1982	(United Kingdom) No. 4 Squadron RAF	Harrier T4A	XW272	Flew into trees on takeoff at Nergen-Hohne ranges, West Germany; Wing Commander Keith Graham Holland AFC did not eject and was killed.
24 September 1982	(United States) VMA-231	AV-8A Harrier	158962	Crashed into the North Sea due to unknown causes while participating in training exercises. 1st Lieutenant Kenneth A. Donnelly Jr. was killed.
6 November 1982	(United Kingdom) No. 1 Squadron RAF	Harrier GR3	XW767	Crashed into the sea off Port Stanley, Falkland Islands due to engine failure. Wing Commander Peter Squire ejected.
1 December 1982	United States Marine Corps	AV-8A Harrier		Pilot was killed during a practice bombing run at MCAS Yuma. The cause of the accident is not known.
21 January 1983	(United Kingdom) 899 Naval Air Squadron	Sea Harrier FRS1	ZA177	Crashed due to loss of control in the village of Cattistock near Dorchester, Dorset. Lieutenant Kevin Fox ejected safely.
2 February 1983	(United States) VMA-513	AV-8C Harrier	159253	Crashed near Twentynine Palms, California; pilot ejected safely.
23 February 1983	(United Kingdom) No. 3 Squadron RAF	Harrier GR3	XV795	Collided with Harrier T4 WX926 over Cambridgeshire; Flight Lieutenant D. Oakley ejected safely.
23 February 1983	(United Kingdom) No. 233 OCU RAF	Harrier T4A	XW926	Collided with Harrier GR3 XV795 over Cambridgeshire; Flight Lieutenant John Roger Leeming, instructor, and Flying Officer David John Haigh, student pilot, were killed.
22 March 1983	(United Kingdom) No. 1453 Flight RAF	Harrier GR3	XV787	Crashed due to engine failure into Port William Sound in the Falkland Islands; pilot ejected safely.
27 April 1983	(United States) VMAT-203	TAV-8A Harrier	159381	Crashed due to a jammed control stick during take off from MCAS Cherry Point; Dwight Motz, student pilot, ejected safely but Captain Paul L. Spargo Jr., instructor, was killed during ejection. The aircraft had crashed previously and been rebuilt. A metal hose adapter had been left beneath the cockpit floorboard and caused the stick to jam.
4 May 1983	(United Kingdom) No. 3 Squadron RAF	Harrier GR3	XZ134	Crashed due to engine failure during take off at Stormede, West Germany; Flight Lieutenant S. K. Brown was badly injured during ejection.
15 June 1983	(United Kingdom) 800 Naval Air Squadron	Sea Harrier FRS1	XZ500	Crashed due to loss of control during a protracted inverted spin in the Bay of Biscay near HMS Illustrious; Lieutenant Hargreaves ejected safely.
28 June 1983	(United States) VMA-513	AV-8A Harrier	158696	Crashed due to loss of power on final approach at NAS Fallon; pilot ejected safely.
22 September 1983	(United States) VMA-513	AV-8A Harrier	158699	Overran runway while landing at MCAS Yuma; pilot ejected safely.
20 October 1983	(United Kingdom) 899 Naval Air Squadron	Sea Harrier FRS1	ZA194	Crashed due to control problems near Dorchester, Dorset; USMC Major O'Hara ejected safely.
28 October 1983	(United Kingdom) No. 233 OCU RAF	Harrier GR3	XV742	Crashed, possibly due to cannon shell ricochet, while conducting gunnery training on the Holbeach Air Weapons Range; Flying Officer John Richard Sewell did not eject and was killed.
19 November 1983	(United Kingdom) No. 1453 Flight RAF	Harrier GR3	XV762	Flew into terrain while engaged in air combat maneuvering exercises near Goose Green in the Falkland Islands, Flight Lieutenant Byron Stewart Clew did not eject and was killed.
9 December 1983	(United States) VMA-542	AV-8C Harrier	158390	Crashed into Oregon Inlet, North Carolina; pilot ejected safely.
16 March 1984	(United Kingdom) 800 Naval Air Squadron	Sea Harrier FRS1	XZ496	Crashed due to engine failure while on approach to HMS Illustrious in the North Sea; pilot ejected safely.
3 June 1984	(United Kingdom) No. 4 Squadron RAF	Harrier GR3	XZ134	Crashed due to engine fire while in hover during a flying display at Grossostheim, Germany; Flight Lieutenant Nick Gilchrist ejected safely.
26 June 1984	(United States) VMA-231	AV-8A Harrier	158950	Crashed due to loss of control during vertical take off at MCAS Cherry Point; pilot ejected safely.
22 October 1984	(Spain) Spanish Navy	AV-8S Matador		Crashed at Rota, pilot ejected.
29 November 1984	(United Kingdom) No. 1453 Flight RAF	Harrier GR3	XZ992	Crashed due to bird strike near Port Stanley, Falkland Islands; Flight Lieutenant Ian Wilkes suffered serious injuries during ejection.
29 November 1984	(United Kingdom) 800 Naval Air Squadron	Sea Harrier FRS1	XZ458	Crashed due to bird ingestion in Highland, Scotland; Lieutenant Collier ejected with injuries.
7 February 1985	(United Kingdom) 899 Naval Air Squadron	Harrier T4N	ZB606	Crashed due to loss of control at Sticklebridge Farm, Charlton Adam, Somerset; Lieutenant Commander George and Midshipman Norman both were killed.
18 February 1985	(United Kingdom) No. 3 Squadron RAF	Harrier T4	XW933	Collided with German Air Force F-104G over Bad Laer, West Germany; Flying Officer K. B. McCann, student pilot, ejected safely but Squadron Leader A. B. Cogram, instructor, was killed.
28 February 1985	(United States) VMAT-203	AV-8C Harrier	158706	Crashed near MCAS Cherry Point.
31 March 1985	(United States) VMAT-203	AV-8B-2-MC Harrier II	161578	Crashed due to engine failure and fire into Long Island Sound near Long Island, New York; Lieutenant Colonel John W. Capito ejected safely but suffered hypothermia due to time spent in the sea before recovery.
3 April 1985	(United States) VMA-542	AV-8C Harrier	158954	Crashed after take off from USS Guadalcanal into the Atlantic Ocean near North Carolina; Royal Air Force Squadron Leader Harry Karl ejected safely.
25 April 1985	(United States) VMA-231	AV-8A Harrier	159231	Crashed due to loss of control during air combat maneuvering near NAS Fallon; 1st Lieutenant Donald R. Flatlie did not eject and was killed.
19 November 1985	(United Kingdom) No. 233 OCU RAF	Harrier GR3	XW922	Rolled over during vertical landing at RAF Wittering.
25 April 1985	(United States) VMA-231	AV-8A Harrier	158955	Crashed near MCAS Yuma.
17 January 1986	(United States) VMA-231	AV-8B-6-MC Harrier II	162724	Crashed due to bird strike near Yuma, Arizona; pilot ejected safely.
27 February 1986	(United States) VMA-231	AV-8B-5-MC Harrier II	162079	Crashed due to loss of control near MCAS Cherry Point.
2 April 1986	(United Kingdom) No. 233 OCU RAF	Harrier GR3	XV784	Written off due to ground fire while parked.
16 April 1986	(United Kingdom) Royal Navy	Sea Harrier FRS1	XZ491	Written off.
17 June 1986	(United Kingdom) No. 233 OCU RAF	Harrier GR3	XW922	Crashed due to an electrical failure on approach to RNAS Yeovilton; Flight Lieutenant Gerry Humphreys ejected safely.
28 June 1986	(United Kingdom) No. 4 Squadron RAF	Harrier GR3	XW769	Crashed due to loss of control during a flying display at Chievres Air Base in Belgium; Flight Lieutenant B. D. Weatherley was killed during ejection.
29 July 1986	(Spain) Spanish Navy	AV-8S Matador		Crashed at Rota.
12 August 1986	(United States) VMA-542	AV-8B-7-MC Harrier II	162745	Mid-air collision with an F/A-18A over the Atlantic Ocean near MCAS Cherry Point; pilot ejected safely.
12 January 1987	(United States) VMAT-203	AV-8B-7-MC Harrier II	162746	Crashed due to a technical problem during take off from MCAS Cherry Point; pilot ejected safely.
5 June 1987	(United States) VMA-331	AV-8B-4-MC Harrier II	162073	Crashed due to engine failure into Barnegat Bay, New Jersey.
12 August 1987	(United States) VMAT-203	TAV-8A Harrier	159380	Crashed due to a canopy failure and unexpected crew ejection during a training flight over Pamlico County, North Carolina; Captain Daniel P. Campbell, pilot, and US Navy Lieutenant Stephen J. Chetneky, flight surgeon, both were killed during ejection.
10 September 1987	(United States) VMA-542	AV-8B-8-MC Harrier II	162961	Crashed on approach to Twentynine Palms, California; pilot ejected safely.
15 October 1987	(United Kingdom) 801 Naval Air Squadron	Sea Harrier FRS1	ZA190	Crashed due to bird ingestion into the Atlantic Ocean near Ireland; pilot ejected safely.
22 October 1987	(United Kingdom) British Aerospace	Harrier GR5	ZD325	Lost over the sea while on a pre-delivery test flight from BAe Dunsfold. The pilot was inadvertently removed from the cockpit by the seat separation drogue gun, leaving the Harrier to fly without a pilot but with the broken canopy attached. The aircraft was intercepted by a passing USAF Lockheed C-5 Galaxy, to check for signs of life, before crashing in the Atlantic Ocean off the Irish coast, due to fuel exhaustion.
2 November 1987	(United Kingdom) No. 3 Squadron RAF	Harrier GR3	XV790	Collided with XZ136 over Otterburn ranges; United States Navy Lieutenant John Carver was killed.
2 November 1987	(United Kingdom) No. 3 Squadron RAF	Harrier GR3	XZ136	Collided with XV790 over Otterburn ranges; Flight Lieutenant David Robin Sunderland was killed during ejection.
1 March 1988	United States Marine Corps			Pilot was killed during an air-to-air combat training run. His plane crashed in the Neuse River near Cherry Point, North Carolina.
4 May 1988	(India) Indian Navy	Sea Harrier FRS51	IN601	Crashed near Goa, pilot killed.
20 May 1988	(United Kingdom) Royal Air Force	Harrier GR3	XV809	Hit trees following loss of control after entering clouds on takeoff at RAF Gutersloh.
27 June 1988	(India) Indian Navy	Harrier T60	IN652	Crashed, crew ejected.
13 July 1988	United States Marine Corps			Pilot was killed seconds after takeoff from Cherry Point, North Carolina, when his flaps malfunctioned due to an electrical short.
18 August 1988	(United Kingdom) No. 3 Squadron RAF	Harrier GR3	XW921	Crashed into wood near RAF Gutersloh after engine fire on takeoff.
5 November 1988	United States Marine Corps	AV-8 Harrier		Pilot was injured when his Harrier AV-8 crashed while attempting a landing at Maxwell AFB, Montgomery, AL.
3 May 1989	United States Marine Corps	AV-8B Harrier II		Pilot was killed during a short takeoff, a complicated maneuver for an inexperienced pilot. The AV-8B Harrier's nozzles were reportedly not set properly for the maneuver, followed by ejecting too late.
20 June 1989	(United Kingdom) No. 3 Squadron RAF	Harrier T4	XW925	Abandoned after loss of control at RAF Gutersloh.
18 December 1989	(Spain) Spanish Navy	EAV-8B-9 Matador	01-901	Crashed, unreported location.
23 January 1990	(Spain) Spanish Navy	EAV-8B-9 Matador		Crashed at Rota, pilot killed.
26 January 1990	United States Marine Corps	AV-8B Harrier II		Pilot was killed on a training flight from Kadena Air Base on Okinawa to Osan Air Base in South Korea. His AV-8B harrier fell from 35,800 feet, sliced through a cloud bank and disappeared into the water without explanation. Neither plane nor pilot was ever found.
12 February 1990	(United States) VMA-223	AV-8B Harrier II	163187	Pilot died and a reconnaissance observer was hurt when they ejected almost simultaneously from separate aircraft during training missions at the Marine Corps Air Ground Combat Center Twentynine Palms, Twentynine Palms, California. The pilot was killed after ejecting from his AV-8B Harrier II, BuNo 163187, from VMA-223, based at MCAS Cherry Point, North Carolina, which crashed in a remote area. The aerial observer who ejected from North American OV-10 Bronco, suffered minor injuries. The Bronco landed safely.
2 October 1990	United States Marine Corps	AV-8B Harrier II		Pilot was killed during a low-altitude flight over a dense North Carolina forest after ejecting from his AV-8B Harrier. He hit the trees before his parachute opened.
18 January 1991	United States Marine Corps	AV-8B Harrier II		Shot down by anti-aircraft artillery.
22 January 1991	United States Marine Corps	AV-8B Harrier II		Pilot was killed conducting a training mission during the Persian Gulf War when he smashed into the Omani coastline while approaching the deck of the amphibious assault ship Nassau for a landing.
9 February 1991	United States Marine Corps	AV-8B Harrier II		Shot down by a surface-to-air missile.
23 February 1991	United States Marine Corps	AV-8B Harrier II		Shot down by a surface-to-air missile over Kuwait, pilot is killed.
27 February 1991	United States Marine Corps	AV-8B Harrier II		Shot down on the final day of the Persian Gulf War by anti-aircraft artillery, pilot (Woody) is killed.
25 September 1991	(United Kingdom) No. 233 OCU RAF	Harrier T4	XZ147	Crashed after low level bird strike near Driffield, Yorkshire; both crew ejected and survived but one (a female university officer cadet) was seriously hurt.
11 November 1991	United States Marine Corps	AV-8B Harrier II		Pilot was killed after he steered away from the Spanish village of Villagarcía de la Torre (in spanish) and ejected with the plane upside down. His parachute broke away before he reached the ground. The investigation determined that a problem with the ailerons caused the crash but offered no explanation for the parachute failure.
7 February 1992	(United Kingdom) Royal Air Force	Harrier GR3	XW927	Damaged beyond repair in a heavy landing at RAF Gutersloh.
14 May 1992	(United Kingdom) Royal Air Force	Harrier GR3	XZ990	Crashed at RAF Wittering after loss of engine power in hover.
9 June 1992	(India) Indian Navy	Sea Harrier FRS51	IN619	Crashed, the pilot was unharmed.
29 June 1992	(United States) VMA-214	AV-8B Harrier II		Pilot was killed after his parachute veered into the fireball created at the Davenport Municipal Airport in Iowa when his AV-8B Harrier exploded at the end of the runway during an aborted takeoff attempt.
16 August 1992	United States Marine Corps	AV-8B Harrier II		Pilot was killed while simulating bombing runs in the desert of Kuwait. Cause not determined.
19 September 1992	United States Marine Corps	AV-8B Harrier II		Pilot was killed during a training flight that began at Cherry Point, North Carolina, when his AV-8B Harrier crashed in shallow water in Pamlico Sound. Cause not determined.
9 December 1992	(India) Indian Navy	Sea Harrier FRS51	IN612	
10 August 1993	United States Marine Corps	AV-8B Harrier II		Crashed on the runway at Marine Corps Air Station Cherry Point, North Carolina, after the flap electronic control module suffered from moisture ingress. Erroneous flap scheduling led to an uncontrollable descent. The pilot ejected before impact but he descended into the fireball causing fatal injuries.
26 November 1993	(United Kingdom) Royal Air Force	Harrier GR7		Crashed due to mechanical failure, in northern Iraq during a patrol as part of Operation Northern Watch. After safely ejecting from his crippled Harrier the pilot was rescued by a US helicopter, approximately 100 miles inside Iraq, and returned to Incirlik.
26 November 1993	(Spain) Spanish Navy	EAV-8A Matador		Crashed, location unreported.
19 February 1994	(Spain) Spanish Navy	EAV-8A Matador	01-902	Crashed, location unreported.
16 April 1994	(United Kingdom) Royal Navy	Sea Harrier FRS1	XZ498	Operating from the light carrier HMS Ark Royal shot down by a SAM fired by the Army of Republika Srpska, (most probably a Strela 2) near Gorazde. The pilot, Lieutenant Nick Richardson ejected and landed in friendly territory controlled by Bosnian Muslims.
13 May 1994	(Spain) Spanish Navy	EAV-8A Matador	01-810	Crashed off Majorca Island, pilot ejected.
30 January 1995	United States Marine Corps	AV-8B Harrier II		Disappeared at night over the Indian Ocean 140 miles off the coast of Somalia. A three-week search for the pilot and plane ended without success.
18 September 1995	United States Marine Corps	AV-8B Harrier II		Pilot was killed during a night training run in North Carolina when his AV-8B Harrier clipped another Harrier in the formation and crashed into the Neuse River.
8 February 1996	(India) Indian Navy	Sea Harrier FRS51	IN620	Missing during night flying over sea.
23 February 1996	(United Kingdom) 899 Naval Air Squadron	Harrier T4A	XZ445	Crashed near the Merry Harriers Inn, about 6nm South of Taunton, Somerset about 2 miles West of RAF Culmhead. The pilot, Lt Cdr Michael Auckland, and the flight engineer, CPO Stephen Brooks were both killed in the incident.
16 February 1996	United States Marine Corps	AV-8B Harrier II		Pilot was killed shortly after takeoff from Cherry Point, North Carolina, when his AV-8B was apparently struck by lightning.
7 October 1996	United States Marine Corps	AV-8B Harrier II		Pilot was killed during a training mission over California's Chocolate Mountains when three bombs, all with expired fuses, detonated prematurely aboard his AV-8B.
9 January 1997	(United Kingdom) No. 4 Squadron RAF	Harrier GR7	ZD377	Crashed during a short take off at RAF Laarbruch, Germany. The burning aircraft ended up inverted on the runway. The pilot sustained a broken leg and minor injuries.
19 May 1997	Royal Air Force	Harrier GR7		Crashed near RAF Wittering, Yorkshire. The pilot ejected safely.
3 June 1997	Royal Air Force	Harrier GR7	ZG861	Crashed during an exercise sortie near Castle Douglas, Scotland. The accident was determined to have been caused by a spacer failing and multiple pieces of the engine being ingested. The pilot ejected safely and was commended for his handling of the accident.
30 September 1997	(India) Indian Navy	Sea Harrier FRS51	IN611	
15 October 1997	United States Marine Corps	AV-8B Harrier II		Assigned to the Marine Corps Air Station at Cherry Point, N.C. crashes on takeoff during a training mission at Wright-Patterson Air Force Base. The Harrier went down at about 2 p.m. in a cornfield just 50 feet from I-675, near where it crosses I-70 in western Ohio. Witnesses on the ground and in another fighter said flames shot from the jets' engine moments before it crashed and that the pilot did an amazing job at directing the disabled aircraft into an unpopulated area before safely ejecting. The crash was under investigation.
18 December 1998	(United Kingdom) No. 20 Squadron RAF	Harrier GR7	ZD434	Crashed near the village of Staindrop, 3 miles NE of Barnard Castle. The pilot, Group Captain David Haward, was killed in the accident.
29 January 1999	(United Kingdom) No. 3 Squadron RAF	Harrier GR7	ZG856	Crashed at Nellis Air Force Range during Red Flag Exercise. The pilot ejected successfully but suffered serious injuries.
2 May 1999	United States Marine Corps	AV-8B Harrier II		Crashed into the Adriatic Sea whilst returning to USS Kearsarge from a training mission, after the pilot ejected.
9 July 1999	(United Kingdom) No. 4 Squadron RAF	Harrier GR7	ZD345	Crashed 5 miles SW of Boston, Lincolnshire. The pilot ejected successfully without sustaining serious injury.
14 July 1999	(United Kingdom) No. 3 Squadron RAF	Harrier GR7	ZG532	Crashed near Cornhill on Tweed, Northumberland. The pilot ejected successfully moments before impact.
30 August 1999	United States Marine Corps	AV-8B Harrier II		Pilot was killed after his AV-8B Harrier lost power over Death Valley National Park. He ejected but hard landed in rocky terrain and died of a head injury. Power loss was found to be due to a wrong-sized washer having been installed. The problem had been discovered three years before, but his plane was among those not yet inspected for it.
15 April 2000	United States Marine Corps	AV-8B Harrier II		Crashed during a Weapons and Tactics Instructor (WTI)training mission in the Chocolate Mountain ranges in Arizona. Pilot ejected but sustained head and shoulder injuries and lost an eye.
3 February 2001	United States Marine Corps	TAV-8B Harrier II		Crashed as it neared touchdown on a base runway at Marine Corps Air Station Cherry Point, killing two aviators.
25 May 2001	(India) Indian Navy	Sea Harrier FRS51	IN610	Crashed at Phadkevam, pilot ejected.
4 March 2002	(Italy) Italian Navy	AV-8B+ Harrier II	MM7216/1-10	Written off after off-runway landing at Grottaglie airbase, pilot unharmed.
2 August 2002	(United Kingdom) Royal Air Force	Harrier GR7	ZD464	Crashed into sea, while hovering during a performance at the Lowestoft Seafront Air Festival, Suffolk. The pilot ejected before crashing into the sea and was later rescued by a lifeboat. The pilot made an error when he retarded the throttle instead of moving the nozzle lever to the "Hover Stop" position. He had then moved his hand to lower the landing gear when he noticed the engine note change, he advanced the throttle but unwittingly moved the nozzle lever forward causing a sudden loss of altitude; the crash was caught on video.
5 December 2002	(United Kingdom) Royal Navy	Harrier T8		Crashed on takeoff at RAF Wittering, Cambridgeshire; one pilot killed.
1 April 2003	(United States) HMM-263	AV-8B+(R) Harrier II	165391	Crashes off USS Nassau in the Persian Gulf during the 2003 invasion of Iraq; the pilot was rescued.
12 April 2003	(Spain) Spanish Navy	EAV-8B Matador	01-921	Crashed, location unrecorded.
24 August 2003	(India) Indian Navy	Sea Harrier FRS51	IN615	Crashed into sea during landing.
17 December 2004	(India) Indian Navy	Sea Harrier FRS51	IN604	Crashed during a hover landing at Dabolim.
14 October 2005	(United Kingdom) Royal Air Force	Harrier GR7A		Destroyed in a rocket attack by Taliban forces while parked on the tarmac at Kandahar. No one was injured in the attack. It was replaced by another fighter which flew out from Britain on the same evening.
5 December 2005	(India) Indian Navy	Sea Harrier FRS51	IN607	Pilot killed
6 December 2005	(United States) VMAT-203	AV-8B Harrier II		Crashed approx 20 miles east of Saint Augustine, Florida; Capt Jason Thomsen safely ejected and was rescued by the United States Coast Guard.
13 July 2006	(United Kingdom) Royal Air Force	Harrier GR9		Crashed near Oxford Airport whilst transitioning to RAF Fairford for the 2006 Royal International Air Tattoo. The pilot ejected safely and was rescued. The crash was caused by pilot error.
5 April 2007	(India) Indian Navy	Harrier T60	IN651	Crashed into the sea near Goa, crew ejected, one rescued one killed.
9 September 2007	(India) Indian Navy	Sea Harrier FRS51	IN608	Crashed into sea during carrier landing, pilot ejected.
27 November 2007	(United States) VMA-513	AV-8B Harrier II		Crashed near Marine Corps Air Station Yuma, Arizona, with the pilot ejecting safely. The crash occurred during a routine training mission.
24 December 2007	(India) Indian Navy	Sea Harrier FRS51	IN613	Crashed at Dabolim, pilot ejected.
13 February 2008	(United States) VMA-542	AV-8B Harrier II		Crashed at the Open Ground Farms in Carteret County, North Carolina. The pilot was able to safely eject.
15 May 2008	(United States) VMAT-203	TAV-8B Harrier II		Crashed while on a training mission in southern Arizona, with both pilots ejecting safely.
16 June 2008	(United Kingdom) Royal Air Force	Harrier GR7		Crashed at around 1.50pm near the village of Ashwell, in an unpopulated area of Rutland, after the pilot ejected shortly before landing at RAF Cottesmore.
29 December 2008	(United States) VMAT-203	TAV-8B Harrier II		Crashed in an unpopulated area approximately one mile east of the air station near NC Highway 101, killing the pilot. The crash occurred while returning from a routine training flight.
14 May 2009	(United Kingdom) Royal Air Force	Harrier GR9A		Crash landed in Kandahar, Afghanistan, the Ministry of Defence said. The pilot suffered only minor injuries after ejecting from the aircraft when it came down at Kandahar airfield at about 10:30am local time. There were no other casualties. After a steep approach to avoid enemy fire, the aircraft hit the runway hard, a tire exploded, the outrigger blew off and ruptured the fuel tank. The RAF pilot ejected after flames began to engulf the cockpit.
14 May 2010	(Italy) Italian Navy	AV-8B+ Harrier II	MM7221/1-15	Crashed in the Jonian Sea off Calabria due to technical problems, pilot ejected safely.
18 July 2010	United States Marine Corps	AV-8B Harrier II		Crashed in an unpopulated area of the Ocala National Forest in Florida.
29 March 2011	United States Marine Corps	AV-8B Harrier II		Crashed into the water during takeoff for a routine training flight while operating in the Arabian Sea deployed with 13th Marine Expeditionary Unit (MEU) embarked aboard amphibious assault ship USS Boxer (LHD-4).
25 July 2012	United States Marine Corps	AV-8B Harrier II		Crashed shortly after take off for a routine training flight over an unpopulated area near Felicity, CA
14 September 2012	United States Marine Corps	AV-8B Harrier II	6 aircraft	Militants breached the perimeter of the sprawling Camp Bastion base in Helmand province of southern Afghanistan in the September 2012 Camp Bastion raid, destroying six US Harrier AV8B aircraft and damaging a further 2. Three aircraft refuelling stations and a number of aircraft hangars were also badly damaged. The offensive took place near an airfield on the northeast side of the base, which houses US forces in Camp Leatherneck. The attack also claimed the lives of two US marines.
9 May 2014	United States Marine Corps	AV-8B Harrier II		Crashed in an unpopulated area of the desert south of Phoenix, Arizona.
4 June 2014	United States Marine Corps	AV-8B Harrier II		Crashed into California homes, pilot ejected safely.
6 May 2016	(United States) VMA-542	AV-8B Harrier II		Crashed in the Atlantic Ocean off the coast of Wrightsville Beach, North Carolina, circa 17:05 hours. The pilot ejected safely and was rescued.
22 September 2016	United States Marine Corps	AV-8B Harrier II		Crashed into the ocean after taking off from US Kadena Air Base.
3 April 2018	United States Marine Corps	AV-8B Harrier II		Crashed in Djibouti shortly after take-off. The aircraft was part of a detachment attached to Marine Medium Tiltrotor Squadron One Six Two, or VMM-162, part of the 26th Marine Expeditionary Unit, which was in the East African country for the annual Alligator Dagger amphibious warfare exercise. The pilot ejected and received treatment in a hospital.

== Notes ==
According to Indian media reports, as many as 16 out of a total 31 Indian Navy Sea Harriers were destroyed in crashes, which claimed seven pilots over a two decade period up to 2007.

== See also ==
Related lists

- List of VTOL aircraft
