= Bell X-14 =

Experimental vertical take-off and landing (VTOL) jet aircraft

X-14
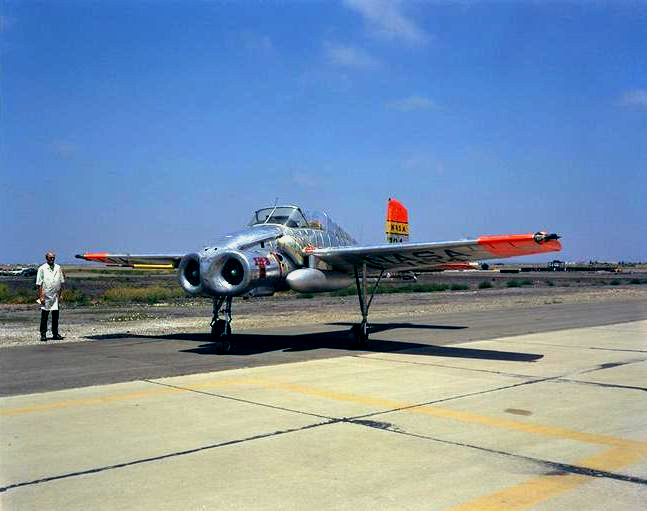
- Bell Type 68 VTOL

General information
- Type: Experimental VTOL
- Manufacturer: Bell Aircraft
- Status: Private Collection
- Primary users: NASA United States Air Force; United States Army
- Number built: 1

History
- Manufactured: 1
- First flight: 19 February 1957; 69 years ago
- Retired: 29 May 1981; 45 years ago

The Bell X-14 (Bell Type 68) is an experimental VTOL aircraft flown in the United States in the 1950s. The main objective of the project was to demonstrate vectored thrust horizontal and vertical takeoff, hover, transition to forward flight, and vertical landing.

== Design and development ==
External image
- Bell X-14 thrust vectoring vanes
- View of the X-14's thrust vectoring vanes used to transition from vertical to horizontal flight from the Ropkey Armor and Aviation Museum.

Bell constructed the X-14 as an open-cockpit, all-metal (duralumin) monoplane for the USAF. It was powered by two Armstrong Siddeley Viper turbojet engines equipped with thrust deflectors sited at the aircraft's centre of gravity. The engines are fixed in position; transition from vertical to horizontal flight is achieved with a system of movable vanes that control the direction of engine thrust. Top speed was 180 miles per hour (290 km/h) with a service ceiling of 20,000 feet (6,100 m). The X-14 was designed using existing parts from two Beechcraft aircraft: wings, ailerons, and landing gear from a Beech Bonanza and the tail group from a Beech T-34 Mentor.

== Operational history ==
The X-14 first flew on 19 February 1957 as a vertical takeoff, hover, then vertical landing. The first transition from hover to horizontal flight occurred on 24 May 1958. In 1959, its Viper engines were replaced with General Electric J85 engines. That year the aircraft was delivered to the NASA Ames Research Center as the X-14A. During the development of the P.1127, Hawker test pilots Bill Bedford and Hugh Merewether visited NASA Ames to fly the X-14 and acquaint themselves with jet V/STOL aircraft handling prior to the first flights of the prototype P.1127. It served as a test aircraft with NASA until 1981.

The X14 project provided a great deal of data on VTOL (Vertical Takeoff and Landing) aircraft and flight control systems, served as a vital training platform for the Apollo space program, and directly contributed to the development of the Hawker Harrier and later the Lockheed Martin F-35B.

In 1971, the X-14A was fitted with new engines (General Electric J85-GE-19) and redesigned the X-14B. An onboard computer and digital fly-by-wire control system were also installed to enable emulation of landing characteristics of other VTOL aircraft.

The aircraft was used by NASA as a Moon-landing simulator. Neil Armstrong flew the aircraft on numerous occasions. Armstrong himself described learning to hover in the X14 as being like “perching on a bubble of hot air.”

The X-14B was used in this test role until it was damaged in a hard landing on 29 May 1981 and never repaired. At the time, there were plans to develop an X-14C with an enclosed cockpit. There were also plans for an X-14T trainer. None of these further versions got beyond the planning stage.

During all of its years of service, the X-14 was flown by numerous pilots with no serious incidents or injuries.

=== Aircraft N numbers ===
Although there was only one airframe and serial number, it changed N numbers from 234 to 704 when the airframe was upgraded under NASA.

- X-14 - USAF 56-4022 (Serial Number)
- X-14A - NASA 234 (N234NA)
- X-14B - NASA 704 (N704NA)

== Surviving aircraft ==
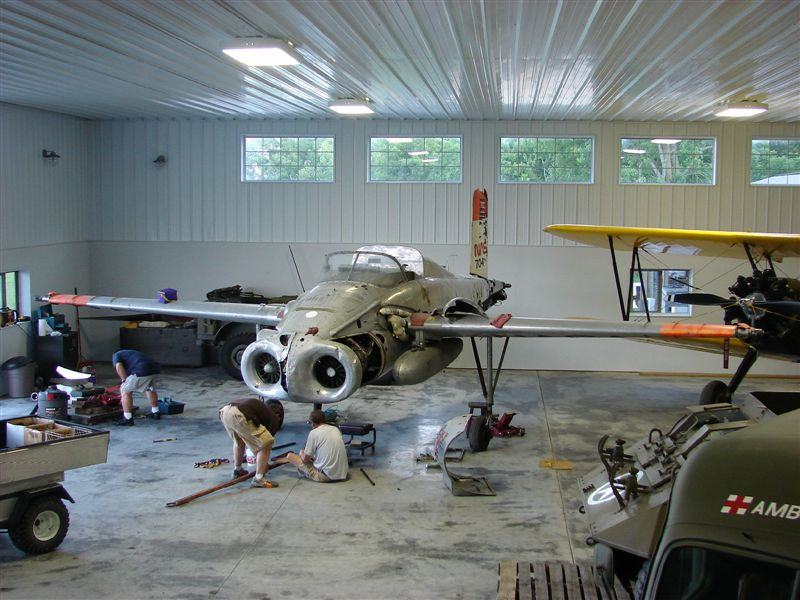
The X-14 undergoing renovation by a private collector in Indianapolis, Indiana at the Ropkey Armor and Aviation Museum

The X-14B was rescued from the scrap yard in 1991 and is undergoing renovation as part of the Ropkey Armor and Aviation Museum.

== Specifications (X-14B) ==
Data from Bell aircraft since 1935

General characteristics

- Crew: 1
- Length: 26 ft 0 in (7.92 m)
- Wingspan: 33 ft 9.5 in (10.300 m)
- Wing area: 179.52 sq ft (16.678 m^{2})
- Airfoil: root: NACA 23016.5; tip: NACA 23012
- Empty weight: 3,173 lb (1,439 kg)
- Gross weight: 4,269 lb (1,936 kg)
- Powerplant: 2 × General Electric J85-GE-19 turbojet engines, 3,015 lbf (13.41 kN) thrust each

Performance

- Maximum speed: 172 mph (277 km/h, 149 kn)
- Range: 300 mi (480 km, 260 nmi)
- Service ceiling: 18,000 ft (5,500 m)
- Thrust/weight: 1.4

Avionics
Auto-stabilisation and computer-controlled engine controls.

== See also ==
Aircraft of comparable role, configuration, and era

- Hawker Siddeley P.1127

Related lists

- List of experimental aircraft
- List of VTOL aircraft
- List of X-planes
