= Ropkey Armor Museum =

Museum in Indianapolis, United States

Ropkey Armor and Aviation Museum
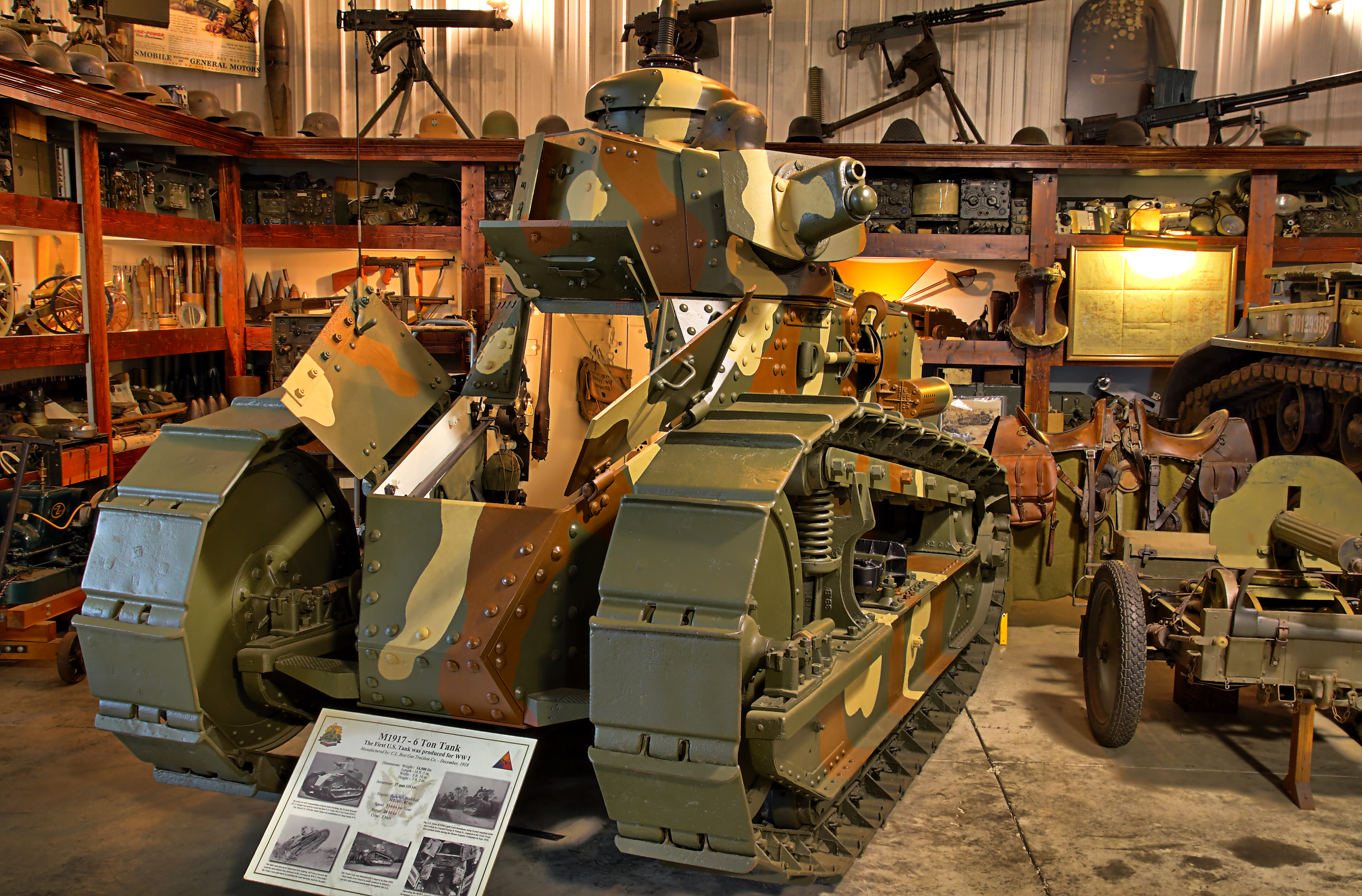
- Six Ton Tank M1917
- Location: Indianapolis, Indiana
- Type: Military, Aviation

Ropkey Armor Museum (today, known as the Ropkey Armor and Aviation Museum) is a military history museum in Indianapolis, Indiana, United States.

== History ==
The museum is privately owned by the Ropkey family. It stemmed from the founder Fred Ropkey's interest in military history and his past career as a tank platoon leader in the U.S. Marine Corps during the early 1950s. The Ropkey Armor Museum returned to Indianapolis in 2017. After the move, the vehicle collection was reduced in size. Some pieces were transferred to other museums, while the core collection was relocated by the Ropkey family to Indianapolis. The museum lives on today as the Ropkey Armor and Aviation Museum with renewed focus given to historic aircraft and aviation history.

== Collection ==
The museum collection consists of armoured fighting vehicles, soft-skinned vehicles, marine craft and aircraft.

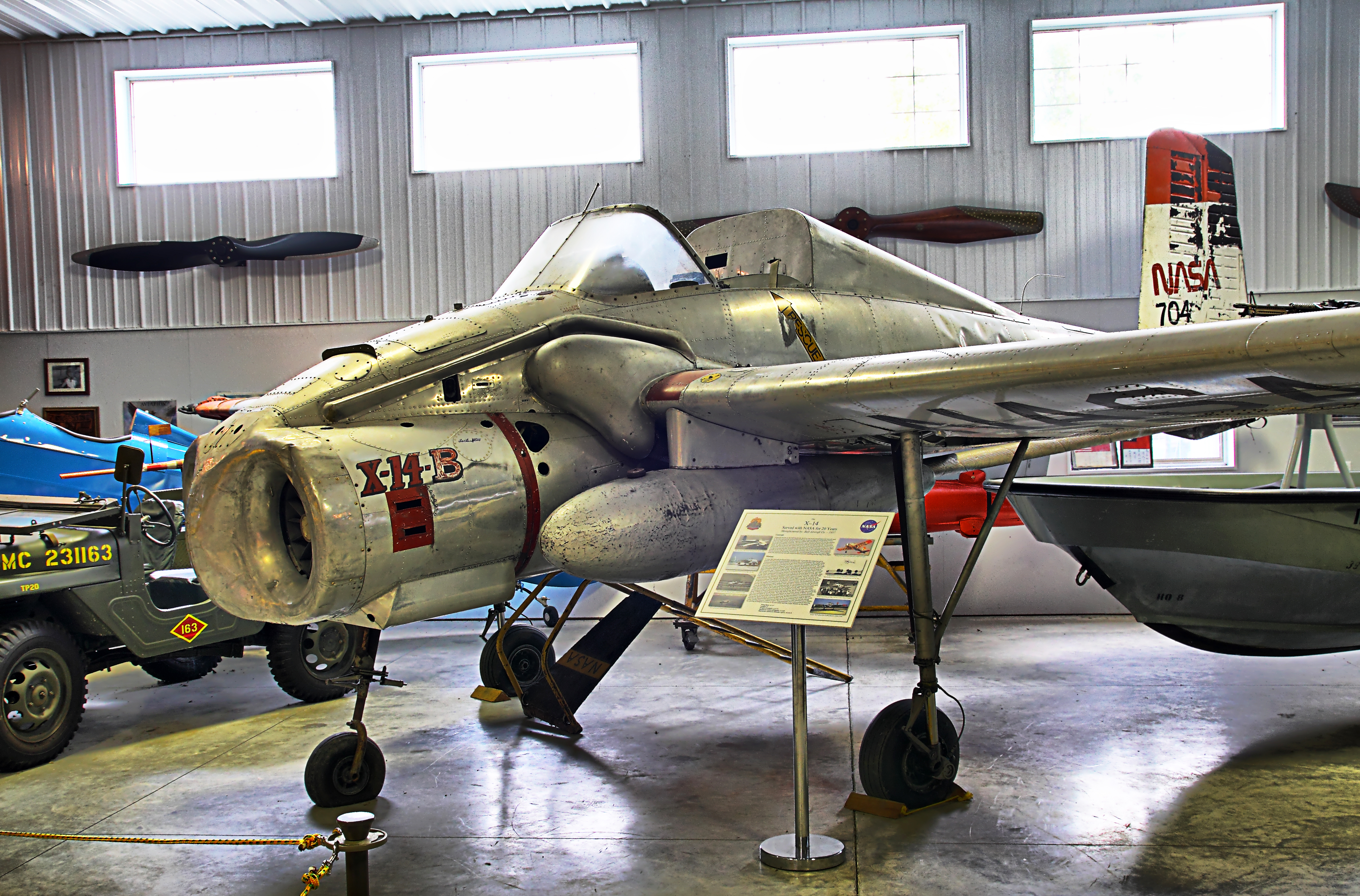
Bell X-14

The aircraft include an Antonov An-2 and the unique Bell X-14B. This aircraft was used for early VTOL research and for training Neil Armstrong and other Apollo astronauts in lunar landing techniques. It is currently being restored by the Ropkey family.
