= Hugh Merewether =

British test pilot

Hugh Merewether (20 May 1924 in South Africa – 13 September 2006) was a British test pilot who pioneered the vertical and short take-off and landing (V/STOL) techniques that led to the development of the Hawker Siddeley Harrier.

Merewether was also the inventor of the Ampair wind turbine generator which was initially used predominantly by cruising sailors. He also developed the Aquair towed turbine generator in which the same electrical generator was rotated by means of a towed turbine, again used by cruising sailors. These two generators allow long range cruisers to generate electricity for charging their battery banks from the free power of the winds and were manufactured by the 'Ampair' company in the UK.

== See also ==
- Bill Bedford
