= VMAT-203 =

Marine Attack Training Squadron 203
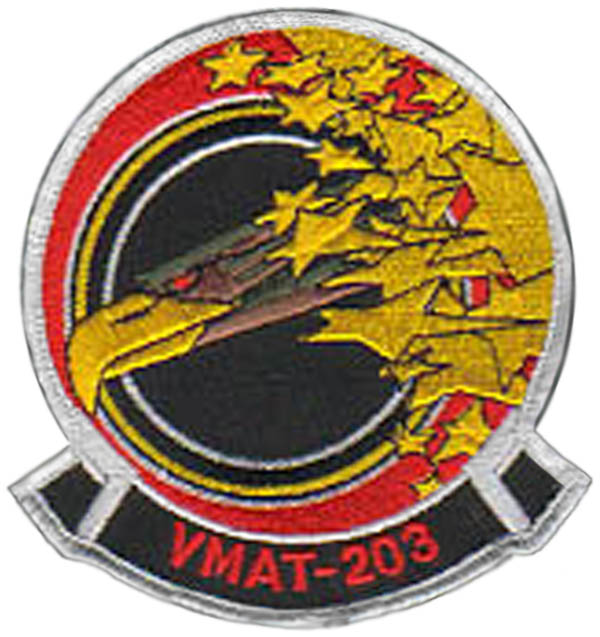
- VMAT-203 Insignia
- Active: 1 July 1947 – 29 October 2021
- Country: United States
- Allegiance: United States of America
- Branch: United States Marine Corps
- Type: Attack
- Role: Fleet Replacement Squadron
- Size: Battalion
- Part of: Marine Aircraft Group 14; 2nd Marine Aircraft Wing
- Garrison/HQ: Marine Corps Air Station Cherry Point
- Nickname(s): "Hawks"
- Tail Code: KD

Commanders
- Current commander: N/A

Insignia
- Call sign: "MARS"

Marine Attack Training Squadron 203 (VMAT-203) was a squadron in the United States Marine Corps that trained naval aviators to fly the AV-8B Harrier. Also known as the Hawks, the squadron was based at Marine Corps Air Station Cherry Point and fell under the command of Marine Aircraft Group 14 and the 2nd Marine Aircraft Wing. Their former radio callsign was "Mars". The squadron was decommissioned on 29 October 2021.

== History ==
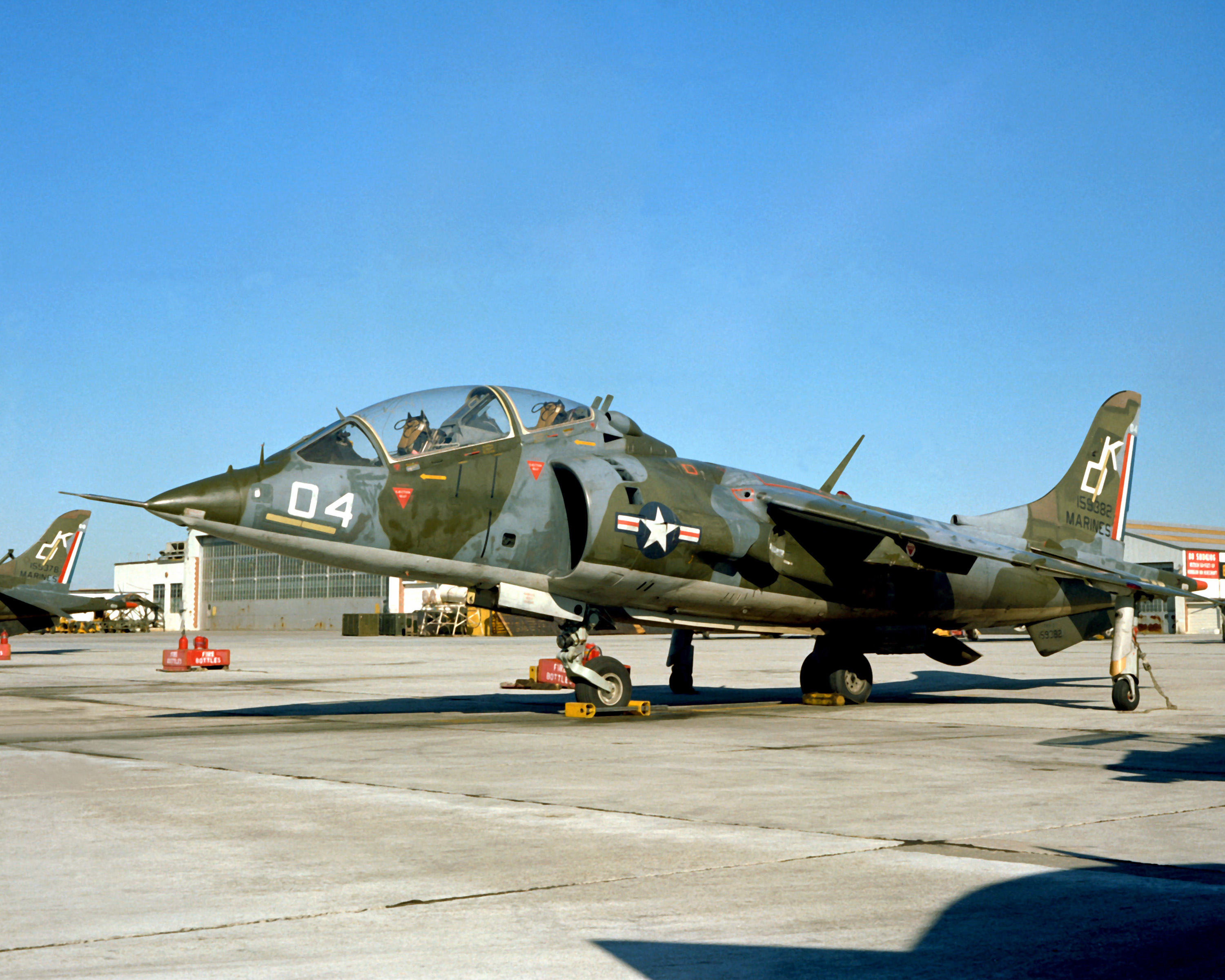
TAV-8A from VMAT-203 at Cherry Point in 1978.

Marine Attack Training Squadron 203 and its predecessors date back to 1947. VMT-1 began the evolution in 1947 as an independent squadron and shortly thereafter became part of Marine Training Group 20. Subsequent evolutions were as a unit of Force Aviation Headquarters Group until 1958, at which time VMT-1 again became a separate squadron of the 2nd Marine Aircraft Wing. Equipped with the TF-9J "Cougar", and the T-33 Shooting Star, and conducted training in swept-wing refresher/ transition, instrument procedures, and instrument ground school.

On 2 July 1967, VMT-1 received its first A-4 Skyhawk and began its transition to the new aircraft. The last F-9 was transferred in December of that year.

In May 1972, the squadron was re-designated VMAT-203. With a new mix of aircraft, the A-4M, and TA-4J, the squadron was tasked to train replacement aircrews to Fleet Marine Force duty.

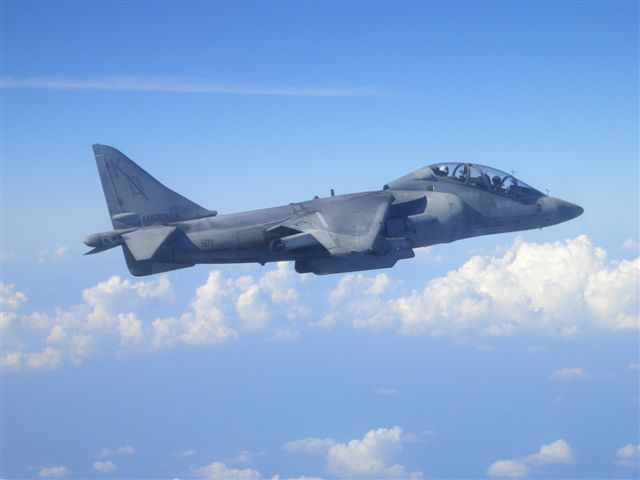
A two-seater TAV-8B Harrier II from VMAT-203 in flight.

The arrival of V/STOL aviation instituted another era for VMAT-203. The squadron's A-4 SkyHawks were retired and VMAT-203 became the AV-8A/C training squadron as part of Marine Aircraft Group 32. In December 1983, the first AV-8B Harrier II was delivered, and until March 1985, VMAT-203 was assigned the dual missions of training both AV-8A/C pilot and AV-8B replacement aircrews. Having trained its last AV-8A/C pilot in March 1985, VMAT-203's exclusive mission then became the training of AV-8B aircrews and maintenance personnel.

An aircraft from the squadron crashed on 29 December 2008 near Marine Corps Air Station Cherry Point. The pilot was killed in the crash.

On 29 October 2021, the squadron was decommissioned, but reformed as the AV-8B Fleet Replacement Detachment (FRD); using aircraft from VMA-223—the last AV-8B squadron.

== See also ==
- List of active United States Marine Corps aircraft squadrons
- United States Marine Corps Aviation
