= Bill Bedford =

British test pilot (1920–1996)

Alfred William Bedford
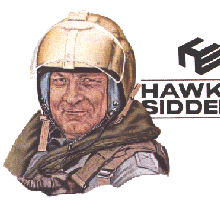
- Bill Bedford; Gathering of Eagles 1995 Lithograph
- Born: 18 November 1920; Loughborough, England
- Died: 20 October 1996 (aged 75); Surrey, England
- Military career
- Allegiance: United Kingdom
- Branch: Royal Air Force
- Service years: 1940 - 1951
- Nickname: Bill
- Units: No. 605 Squadron RAF; No. 135 Squadron RAF; No. 65 Squadron RAF; Empire Test Pilots' School
- Conflicts: Second World War
- Awards: King's Commendation; Order of the British Empire; Air Force Cross; Britannia Trophy; Segrave Trophy de Havilland Trophy
- Other work: Chief Test Pilot, Hawker Aircraft

Alfred William Bedford OBE AFC FRAeS (18 November 1920 – 20 October 1996) was a British test pilot and pioneered the development of V/STOL aircraft.

Bedford was born on 18 November 1920 at Loughborough and was educated at Loughborough College. He was serving an electrical and mechanical apprenticeship and training to be a steeplejack when the war started.

Bedford joined the Royal Air Force as a fighter pilot in 1940. He flew the Hawker Hurricane and the Republic Thunderbolt with No. 605 Squadron RAF and No. 135 Squadron RAF, and the North American Mustang with No. 65 Squadron RAF. Bedford was awarded the Air Force Cross in 1945. After the war, he took a permanent commission with the RAF and became an all-weather flying instructor and tutor at the Empire Test Pilots' School.

On 24 August 1950, an Eon Olympia glider flown by Bill Bedford broke the British distance record by flying 310 km in 3:50 hr. On 2 May 1951 Bedford broke this record with a flight of 413 km from Farnborough to Newcastle.

On his retirement in 1951, he joined Hawker Siddeley and was chief test pilot from 1956 till 1967. Together with his colleague Hugh Merewether he pioneered Hawker's development of V/STOL aircraft. Bedford was the first pilot to fly the Hawker P.1127, Kestrel, and Harrier. In addition to his land-based test pilot duties, he also pioneered the operation of V/STOL aircraft from a ship - the P.1127 on HMS Ark Royal in 1963.

From 1968, he became the Sales Manager for Hawker Siddeley Aviation and later marketing manager when it became British Aerospace. Bedford retired in 1986 and died on 20 October 1996 in West End Esher, Surrey.

Bedford's awards include the King's Commendation, the Order of the British Empire, and the Air Force Cross. In addition, he was awarded the Britannia, Segrave and de Havilland trophies. In 1994, he was awarded the Sir Peter Masefield Gold Medal.
