= VMFAT-502 =

USMC fighter attack training squadron

Marine Fighter Attack Training Squadron 502
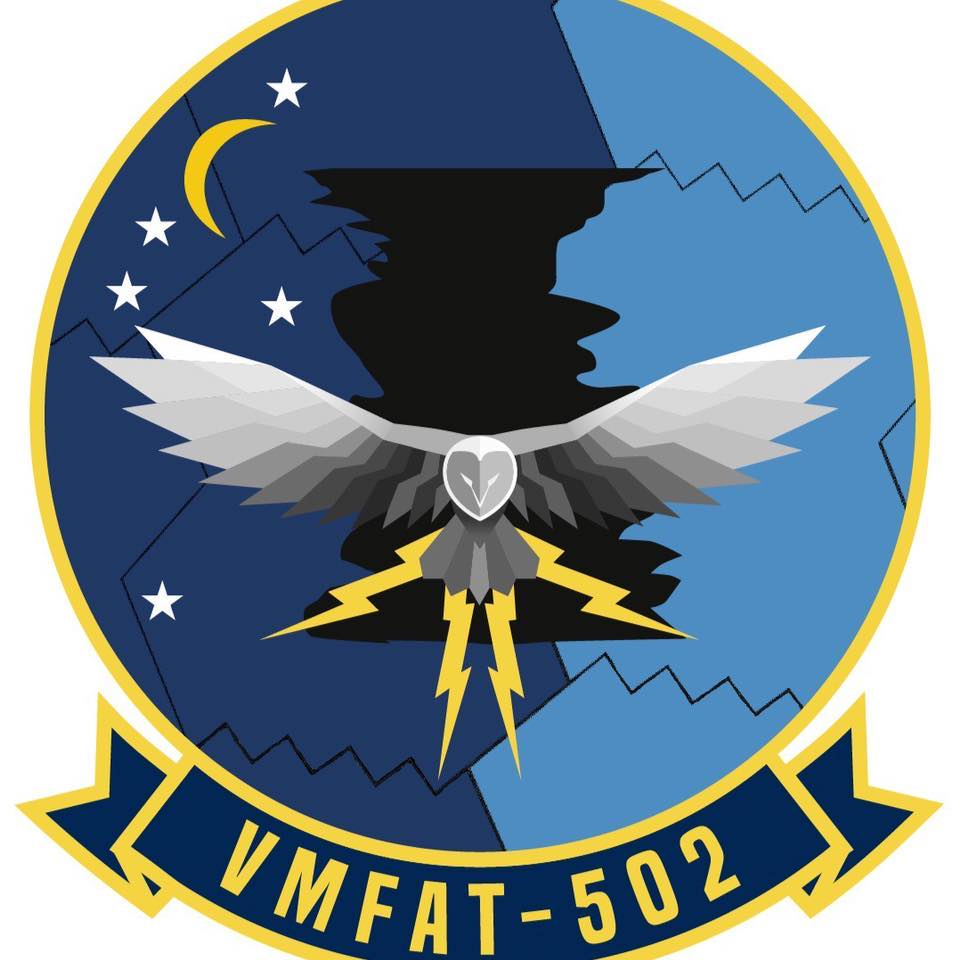
- VMFAT-502 insignia
- Active: 15 February 1944 – 12 July 2013, 26 June 2020 – Present
- Country: United States of America
- Branch: United States Marine Corps
- Type: Fighter Aircraft Training
- Role: Training New F-35B Pilots
- Part of: Marine Aircraft Group 11; 3rd Marine Aircraft Wing
- Nickname: "Flying Nightmares"
- Motto: carpe noctem
- Tail Code: WF
- Engagements: World War II; Battle of Okinawa; Korean War; Vietnam War; Operation Starlite; Operation Desert Storm; Operation Enduring Freedom; Operation Iraqi Freedom

Commanders
- Current commander: LtCol Kyle McHugh

Aircraft flown
- Attack: AV-8A Harrier (1970–87); AV-8B Harrier II (1987–2013)
- Fighter: F6F Hellcat; F4U-5N Corsair; F7F-3N Tigercat; F3D-2 Skyknight (1952–58); F4D-1 Skyray (1958–63); F-4 Phantom II (1963–70); F-35B Lightning II (2020-present)

Marine Fighter Attack Training Squadron 502 (VMFAT-502) is a United States Marine Corps fighter attack training squadron flying the Lockheed Martin F-35 Lightning II. Known as the "Flying Nightmares", the squadron maintains the history of Marine Attack Squadron 513 (VMA-513) which dates back to World War II and was decommissioned on 12 July 2013. The squadron is based at Marine Corps Air Station Miramar and falls under the command of Marine Aircraft Group 11 and the 3rd Marine Aircraft Wing

== History ==
=== World War II ===
Marine Attack Squadron 513 was first commissioned as VMF-513 on 15 February 1944 at Marine Corps Auxiliary Field Oak Grove, North Carolina, flying the Grumman F6F Hellcat. The squadron was transferred to Marine Corps Air Facility Walnut Ridge, Arkansas in September 1944.

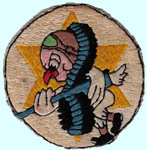
VMF-513 logo during World War II

In December of the same year, the squadron moved to Marine Corps Auxiliary Air Station Mojave, California where it was re-designated VMF(CVS)-513. On 15 June 1945, VMF(CVS)-513 departed San Diego, California, aboard the USS Vella Gulf (CVE-111) and participated in carrier operations in the Pacific, making stops in Ewa, Enewetak, Saipan, and Guam. In addition, they provided close air support for the 3rd Marine Division during the Battle of Okinawa, Japan.

=== Korean War ===
Between World War II and the Korean War, VMF-513 operated from Marine Corps Air Station El Toro, California. Transitioning to the F4U-5N, the squadron was re-designated VMF(N)-513 ("Night Fighters"). In August 1950, the squadron deployed to Japan under operational control of the U.S. 5th Air Force.

The squadron nickname "Flying Nightmares" was coined by then Commanding Officer, LtCol James R. Anderson, USMC, in March 1951 because he thought it most appropriately described his outfit . At this time the squadron, with its 15 F7F "Tigercats" and 15 F4U-5N "Corsairs," were flying out of Pusan West (K-1) Air Base and providing the sole night fighter air defense and interdiction support to all UN forces. In this month alone, the squadron flew 2,086 hours in 604 night combat sorties, inflicting severe damage on the Chinese Forces tactical and logistical units.

During the summer of 1952, VMF(N)-513 received the F3D Skyknight, the squadron's first jet aircraft. Due to losses being incurred by B-29 Superfortresses on nighttime raids over North Korea, 1st MAW was asked to assign their night fighter squadron to escort the aircraft. On the early morning of November 3, 1952, VMF(N)-513 made aviation history with the first radar kill on an enemy jet aircraft at night, when Maj. William T. Stratton Jr., and MSgt Hans Hoglind shot down a North Korean Yak-15. The squadron was credited with 10 confirmed night kills during the Korean War.

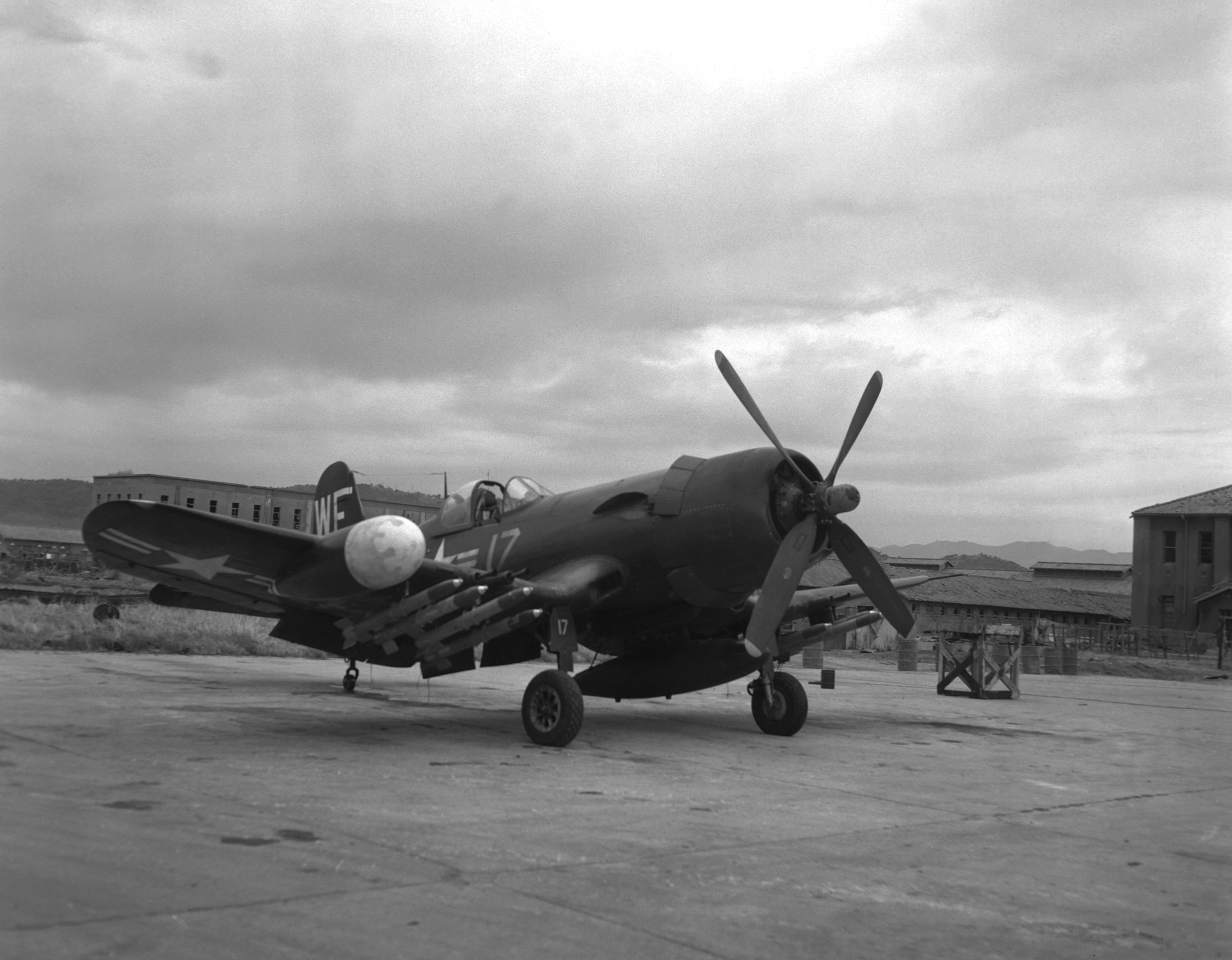
A F4U-5N from VMF(N)-513 in 1950 during the Korean War.

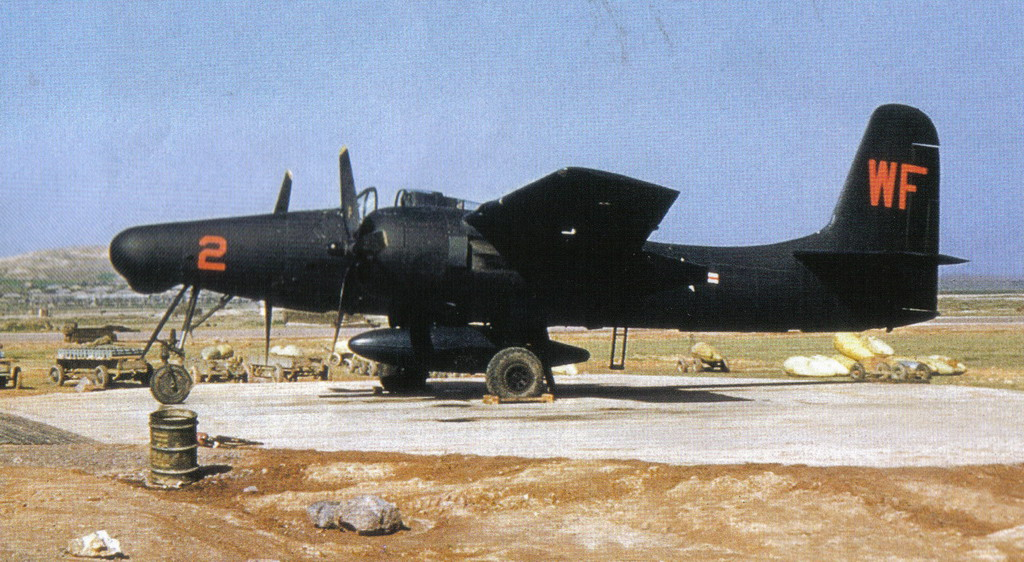
An F7F-3N of VMF(N)-513 at Wonsan, Korea, in 1950.

Following the war, the squadron operated out of NAS Atsugi, Japan. On 26 July 1958, VMF-513 received the F4D Skyray aircraft. In October 1962, VMF(AW)-513 was relocated from NAS Atsugi, Japan, to MCAS El Toro, California. The outfit was effectively disbanded in Japan and reformed in El Toro under a new CO, who organized new pilots and maintenance Marines to operate the now "old" F-4D Skyrays while the Flying Nightmares awaited delivery of the brand new F-4 Phantom II. This occurred in early 1963 and most of the Nightmare pilots did their transition training at nearby NAS Miramar, at the Navy's replacement squadron.

=== The 1960s ===
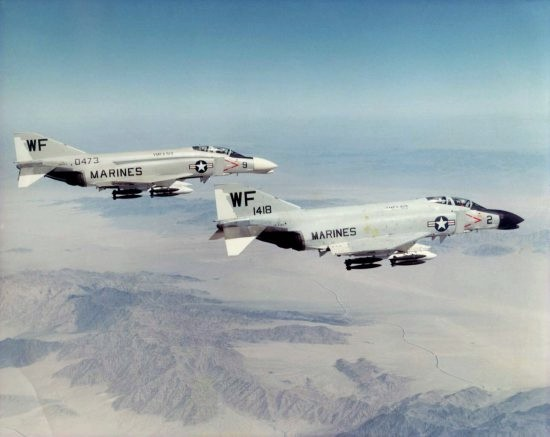
F-4Bs of VMFA-513 in 1964

On 1 August 1963, the squadron was re-designated VMFA-513 and by the end of the year, the Nightmares were exclusively flying F-4's, the third Phantom II squadron in the Marine Corps. They trained in the F-4B at MCAS El Toro through October 1964, when they deployed once again to NAS Atsugi, Japan. In June 1965, the Nightmares replaced VMFA-531 at Da Nang Air Base, South Vietnam for five months of combat and, for a while, were the only Marine jet fighters in country. In August 1965, VMFA-513 supported the 7th Marine Regiment in Operation Starlite – the first major American operation of the war. This one-year overseas deployment ended in October 1965 and the squadron executed another wholesale personnel rotation, this time reforming at MCAS Cherry Point, North Carolina.

=== The 1970s and 1980s ===
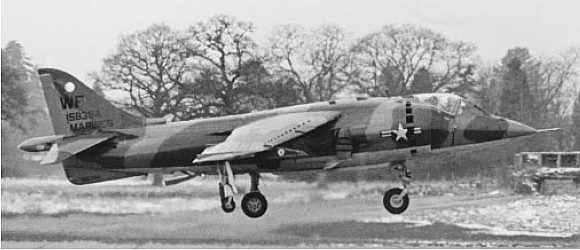
The first USMC AV-8As went to VMA-513 in 1970.

The squadron flew the F-4B Phantom until 30 June 1970, when it was re-commissioned in a cadre status, awaiting delivery of the first Marine AV-8A Harrier on 16 April 1971. The squadron was the first Marine Corps squadron to receive the AV-8A and upon acceptance of the AV-8A. Upon reassignment to the 1st Marine Aircraft Wing, VMA-513 departed the U.S. during July 1974 aboard the USS Tripoli (LPH-10) for MCAS Iwakuni, and a six-plane detachment left in September 1974 for a six-month Mediterranean cruise aboard the USS Guam (LPH-9). During November 1976, VMA-513 returned to the United States and was assigned to Marine Combat Crew Readiness Training Group 10 at MCAS Yuma, Arizona (re-designated Marine Aircraft Group 13 on 1 October 1987).

VMA-513 deployed as part of HMM-265 (REIN) ‘Dragons’ aboard USS Tarawa (LHA-1) as part of Task Group 76.3/Amphibious Ready Group Alfa/Amphibious Squadron Seven, from 14 October 1980, visiting Subic Bay, PI and participating in exercises Valiant Blitz in the Philippines, Amphibious Squadron Seven spent almost a week at Phattaya Beach, from 22 to 27 December, before moving on to Singapore where she arrived on the 30th. After operations in Diego Garcia where Amphibious Squadron Seven's embarked Marines carried out a landing exercise between 28 and 30 January, they headed south east for exercise Valiant Usher 81-3 off Lancelin, Western Australia with units of the Australian Military. After Valiant Usher off Western Australia, VMA-513 and Amphibious Squadron One conducted an R&R visit to Perth/Fremantle, Western Australia from 8–13 February 1981. The squadron later took part in exercises Team Spirit 81 and Valiant Flex 81-2 at Pusan (Busan) South Korea. VMA-513 arrived back at MCAS Yuma, AZ on or about 16 April 1981.

In October 1987, the squadron received the improved AV-8B Harrier II.

=== The Gulf War ===
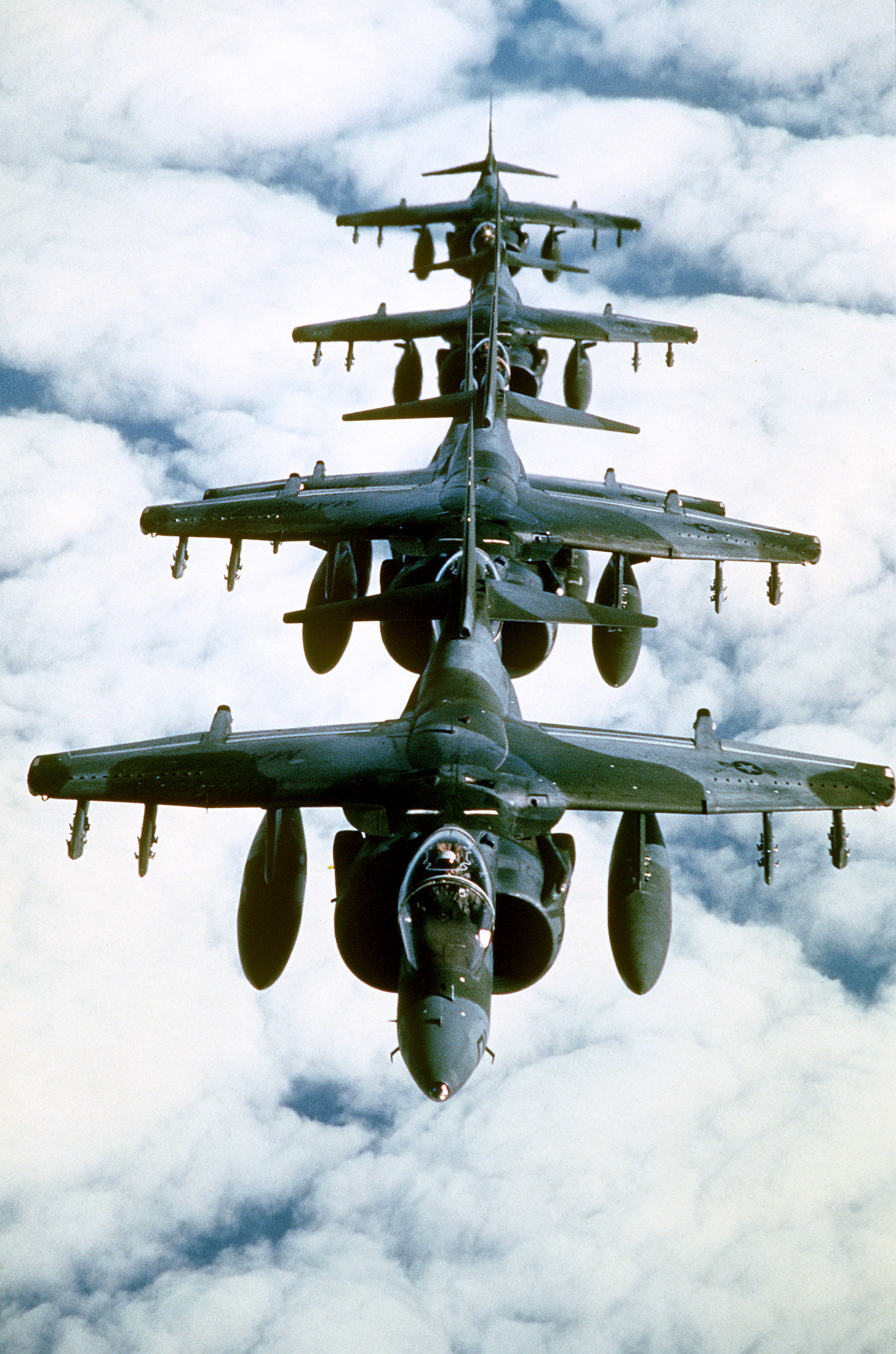
VMA-513 during the Gulf War

In February 1991, VMA-513 deployed for operations in Operation Desert Storm and Desert Shield, employing their new Harrier II's in support of the 15th Marine Expeditionary Unit; logging 103 combat sorties with no losses. At this time, VMA-513 effectively conducted combat operations from austere sites in Southwest Asia. The Nightmares returned home with all of their assets and no loss of life or major injury. Throughout the 1990s and early 21st century the squadron continued to support Marine Expeditionary Units aboard ship for normal six-month-long deployments to the Western Pacific and Persian Gulf.

=== Global War on Terror ===
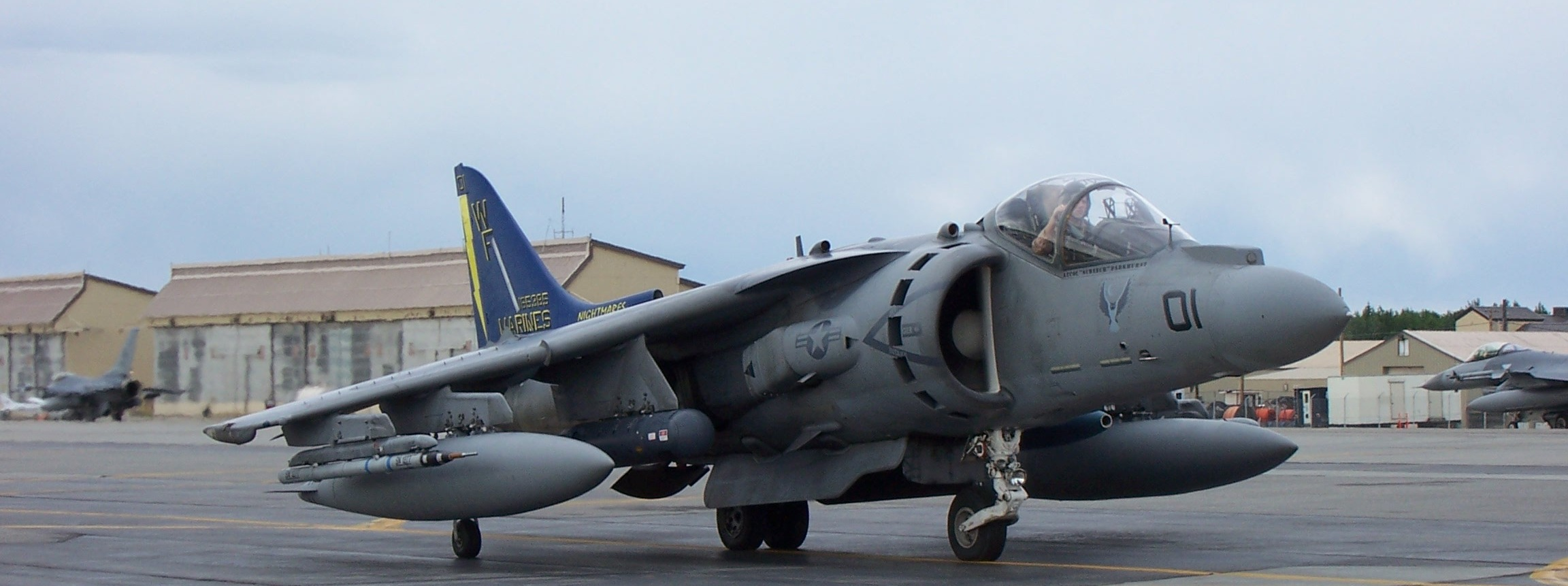
Squadron CO's AV-8B Harrier II in June 2007.

From October 2002 to September 2003, VMA-513 (-) (REIN) deployed to Bagram Air Base, Afghanistan for combat operations in support of Operation Enduring Freedom. Throughout their year in sustained combat, the Marines and Sailors of VMA-513 (-) (REIN) provided close air support, armed reconnaissance, and combat escort for the United States and over 20 Coalition countries of the Combined Joint Task Force 180. Throughout its time in combat in Afghanistan, the squadron amassed 1,250 combat sorties and 3,764 flight hours with only six aircraft while operating from a remote austere forward combat base. Additionally, VMA-513 (-) (REIN) flew 1,833.7 nighttime hours; thus, providing day and night precision strike capability for American and Coalition units with the newly introduced Litening II Targeting Pod. VMA-513 (-) (REIN) supported numerous US and Coalition operations that led to the capture or destruction of many Al Queda and Taliban enemy forces. While the squadron minus was deployed to Afghanistan, a six plane detachment was also deployed twice with Marine Expeditionary Units aboard ship and flew combat missions in support of Operation Iraqi Freedom (OIF) and operations on the Horn of Africa.

In February 2006, the Flying Nightmares were again deployed to Al Asad Airbase, Iraq, to provide close air ground support for ground units in the Iraq area. The squadron flew 4519 combat hours with a sortie completion rate of over 95%. On 11 May 2006, VMA-513 became the first Harrier unit to drop a JDAM (Joint Direct Attack Munition) in combat when it struck targets with a GBU-38 500 lb JDAM.

=== Decommissioning and Recommissioning ===
On 12 July 2013, VMA-513 was decommissioned after 69 years of service. The squadron's remaining aircraft were transferred to sister squadron, VMA-214.

The squadron was recommissioned on 26 June 2020 as Marine Fighter Attack Training Squadron 502, the Marine Corps' second F-35B Fleet Replacement Squadron (FRS).

== Other information ==
- In 2002 a VMF-513 Sergeant missing since 30 May 1953 {Korean War} was laid to rest at Arlington National Cemetery.
- An AV-8C Harrier with VMA-513 markings is on display at the Pima Air & Space Museum in Tucson, Arizona.
- LtCol. Michael Franzak (USMC, Ret.), the former Executive Officer of VMA-513, is the author of a book, A Nightmare's Prayer, detailing the squadron's exploits during its yearlong deployment to Afghanistan from 2002 to 2003
- An F-4B Phantom II from VMFA-513 appeared in an episode of The Man from U.N.C.L.E., "The Yellow Scarf Affair" on 25 January 1965.
- The squadron is featured in an episode of The Lieutenant, "To Take Up Serpents" on 19 October 1963.

== Gallery ==
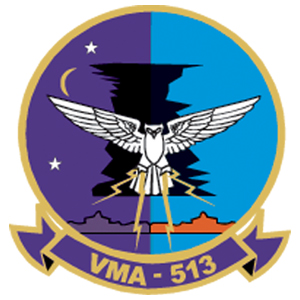

== See also ==
- United States Marine Corps Aviation
- Organization of the United States Marine Corps
- List of active United States Marine Corps aircraft squadrons
