= McDonnell Douglas F/A-18 Hornet in Australian service =

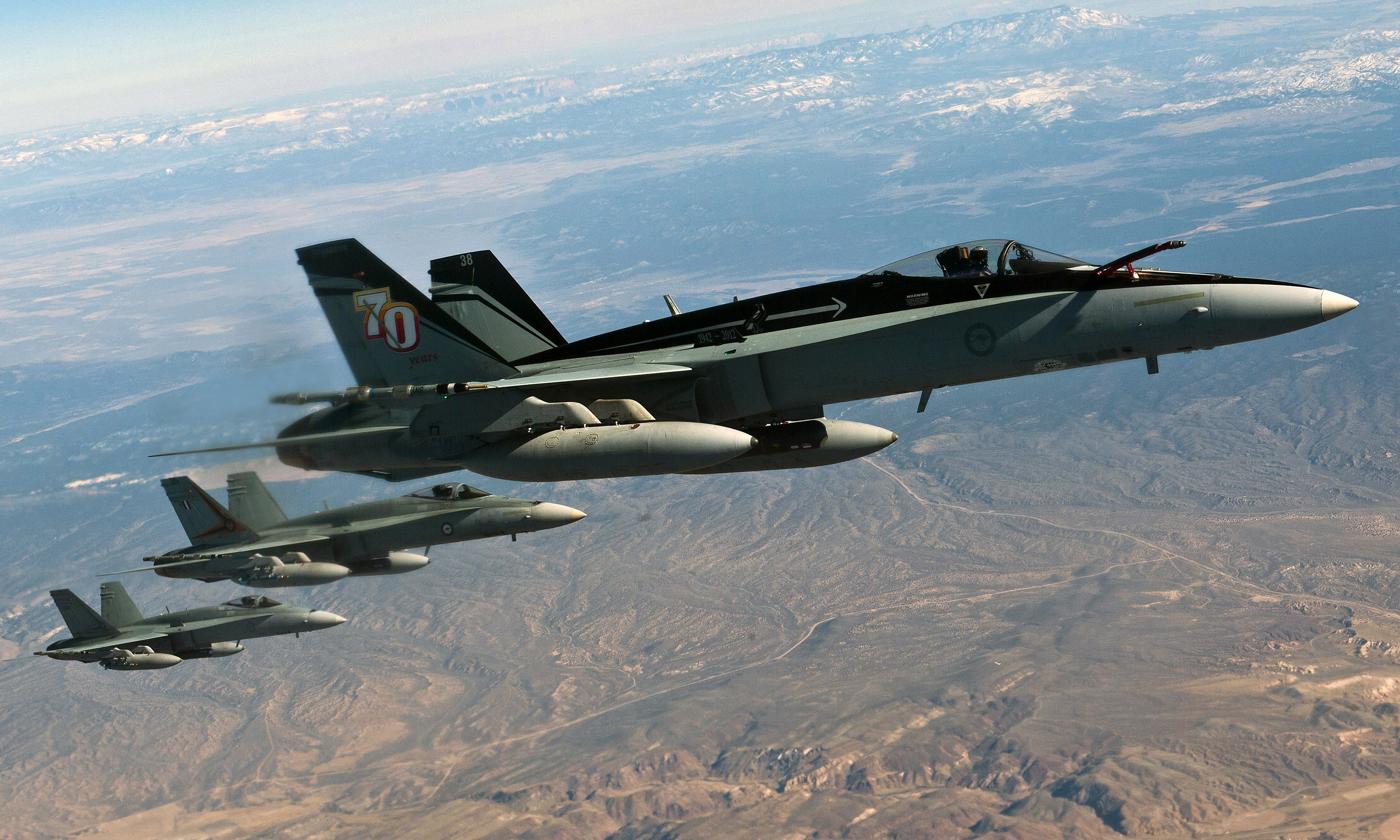
- Three RAAF F/A-18A Hornets in 2012

General information
- Type: Multirole fighter
- Manufacturer: McDonnell Douglas
- Built by: Most assembled by Government Aircraft Factories
- Status: Retired
- Primary user: Royal Australian Air Force
- Number built: 57 F/A-18A, 18 F/A-18B
- Serial: A21-1 to A21-57 (F/A-18A); A21-101 to A21-118 (F/A-18B)

History
- Manufactured: 1984–1990
- In service: 1984–2021

The Royal Australian Air Force (RAAF) operated McDonnell Douglas F/A-18 Hornet fighter aircraft between 1984 and 2021. The Australian Government purchased 75 A and B variants of the F/A-18 in 1981 to replace the RAAF's Dassault Mirage III fighters. The Hornets entered service with the RAAF between 1984 and 1990. Four Hornets were destroyed in flying accidents during the late 1980s and early 1990s.

RAAF Hornets were first sent on a combat deployment as part of the Australian contribution to the 2003 invasion of Iraq. During the invasion, 14 Hornets flew patrols over Iraq, as well as close air support sorties to assist coalition ground forces. RAAF F/A-18s also provided security for the American air base at Diego Garcia between late 2001 and early 2002, and have protected a number of high-profile events in Australia. Between 2015 and 2017 a detachment of Hornets was deployed to the Middle East and struck ISIL targets as part of Operation Okra.

Commencing in 1999, the RAAF put its Hornets through a series of upgrades to improve their effectiveness. However, the aircraft became increasingly difficult to operate and were at risk of being outclassed by the fighters and air-defence systems operated by other countries. The type was replaced by 72 Lockheed Martin F-35 Lightning II fighters. The Australian Government offered the Hornets for sale after they were retired and 25 were sold to Canada in early 2019. Eight F/A-18s were preserved for historical purposes in Australia. The remaining Hornets were scrapped after a deal to sell them to a private company failed in 2023.

== Selection ==
The RAAF began the initial stages of finding a replacement for its Dassault Mirage III fighters in 1968. The service issued an Air Staff Requirement for new fighter aircraft in December 1971, which received a larger than expected number of proposals from manufacturers. At that time the RAAF expected to start phasing out the Mirage IIIs in 1980. In 1973, a team of RAAF personnel inspected the McDonnell Douglas F-15 Eagle, Northrop YF-17, Saab 37 Viggen and Dassault Mirage F1 programs, but recommended that any decisions about a suitable replacement be delayed so that several new fighters that were expected to soon become available could also be considered. In August 1974 the Australian Government decided to defer the fighter replacement project and extend the Mirage IIIs' operational life into the 1980s. One of the four Mirage III-equipped squadrons was also disbanded at this time.

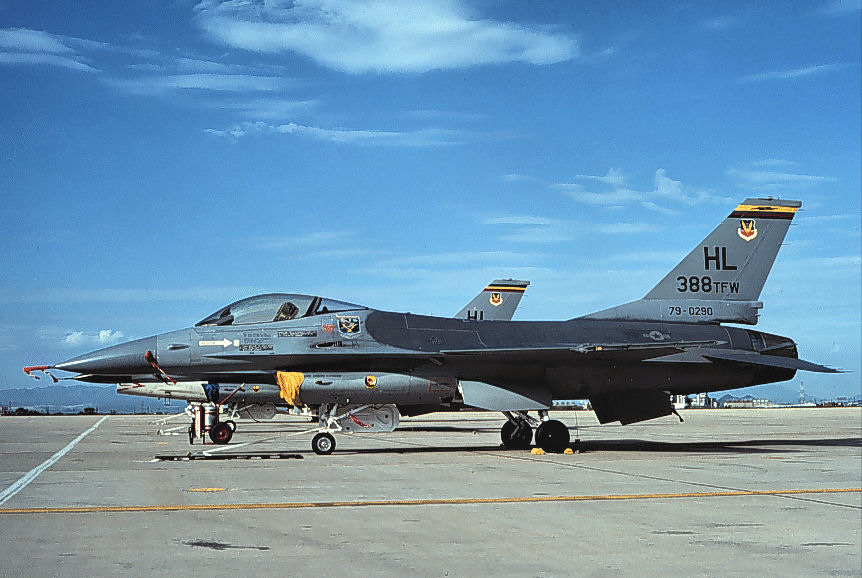
USAF F-16A in 1980

Work on the Mirage replacement program resumed in 1975, and the Tactical Fighter Project Office was established in 1976 to manage the process of selecting the RAAF's next fighter. A request for proposals was issued in November that year and attracted eleven responses. By March 1977 the office had chosen to focus on the F-15 Eagle, General Dynamics F-16 Fighting Falcon, Dassault Mirage 2000 and Panavia Tornado, as well as the McDonnell Douglas F-18A and F-18L; the F-18A was a carrier-based fighter developed from the YF-17 for the United States Navy, and the F-18L was a land-based variant of this design. The Grumman F-14 Tomcat was also considered by the project office, but was regarded as unsuitable and never placed on the official shortlist. In November 1978, the F-15 and Tornado were removed from the list of aircraft being considered. The Tornado was excluded as it was principally a strike aircraft and had limited air-to-air capability. While the F-15 was an impressive aircraft that met or exceeded almost all of the RAAF's requirements, it was believed that the air force did not need a fighter with such advanced capabilities and that introducing it into service could destabilise Australia's region.

Further evaluation of the remaining aircraft took place during 1979. Wing Commander (and later Air Vice-Marshal) Bob Richardson test-flew a Mirage 2000 in April 1979, and reported that while the aircraft had excellent aerodynamic characteristics, its avionics, radar, fuel system, cockpit and weapons capability were inferior to those of US designs. Richardson also test-flew a YF-17 that was being used as a demonstrator for the F-18L in mid-1979, and was impressed by its capabilities. No F-18Ls had been ordered at this time, and the RAAF did not want to take on the risk of being the lead customer for the design. At about the same time, the RAAF rejected an offer of F-14 Tomcats that had been originally ordered by the Iranian Government but not delivered as a result of the revolution in that country. While the Tomcats were made available at a greatly reduced price, the air force judged that these aircraft were too large and complex for its requirements.

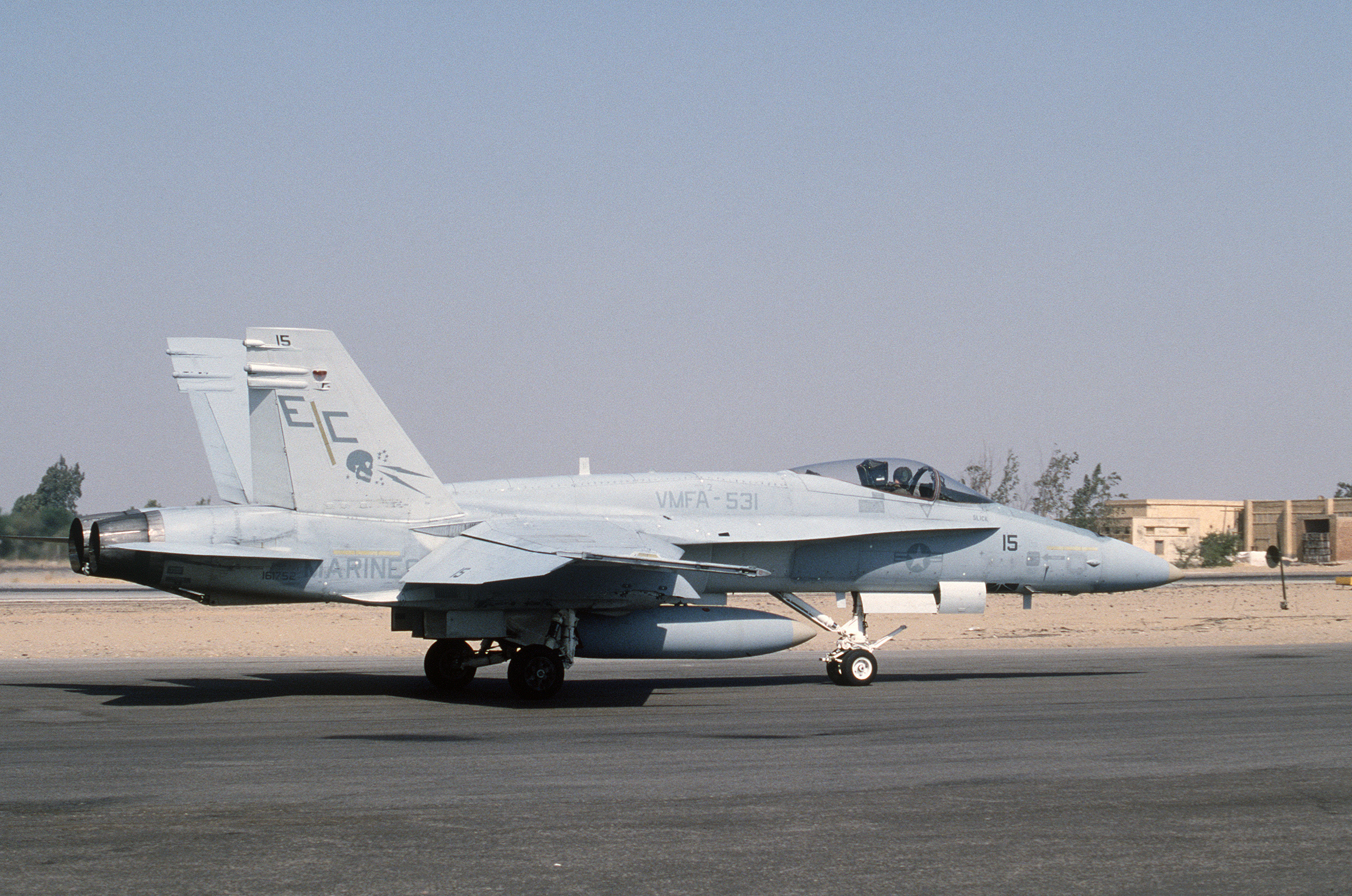
US Marine Corps F/A-18A in 1985

With the Mirage 2000 and F-18L rejected, the RAAF was faced with a choice between the F-16 and F-18A. Richardson and several other RAAF pilots tested United States Air Force (USAF) F-16Bs in 1979 and 1980, and reported that the aircraft had excellent performance but could be difficult to control at times. The evaluation team was also concerned about the reliability of the F-16's engine and regarded the aircraft as technologically immature. It was also noted that the aircraft's radar was inferior to that of the F-18A, and that F-16s could not fire the beyond-visual-range (BVR) air-to-air missiles and long-range anti-shipping missiles that the F-18A was capable of operating. In contrast, the evaluation team was impressed by the F-18A, and regarded it as being a more robust and survivable aircraft as it had been designed to operate from aircraft carriers; these features were important for operations from bare bases in northern Australia. Richardson and three other RAAF pilots test-flew F-18As, and reported that the aircraft handled well, but had some deficiencies with its flight control system and engines; these were not seen as major flaws by the evaluation team. The F-18A's twin engines were considered to be its main advantage over the single-engined F-16, as research conducted by the evaluation team found that the attrition rate for single-engined fighters was twice that for aircraft with two engines. Overall, the RAAF judged that both the F-16 and F-18A were too immature for a decision to be made in 1980 as had been originally planned, and recommended to the Government that this be deferred by a year.

The Government accepted the RAAF's recommendation, and delayed its decision on a Mirage III replacement until late 1981. This gave General Dynamics an opportunity to offer the improved F-16C to the RAAF. The capability of these aircraft was closer to that of the F-18 as they were equipped with BVR missiles. Richardson and another RAAF pilot test-flew F-16Cs in May 1981. The F-18 design was also improved during 1981, and was redesignated the F/A-18. When RAAF test pilots flew these aircraft during 1981, they found that the deficiencies they had detected in 1980 were now addressed. Overall, the RAAF concluded that while both aircraft met its requirements and the F-16 was less expensive, the F/A-18 was the superior design as it was more technologically mature, easier to maintain during operational deployments, and likely to have a much lower attrition rate. The Government accepted this advice, and announced on 20 October 1981 that 75 F/A-18s would be ordered. As part of this announcement, Minister for Defence Jim Killen acknowledged that the F-16 would have been seven percent cheaper to purchase, but stated that the F/A-18's lower running costs and expected attrition rate greatly reduced the difference between the lifetime cost of the two designs.

Instead of directly ordering the aircraft from McDonnell Douglas, the Australian Government purchased its F/A-18s through the US Government's Foreign Military Sales (FMS) program. Ordering the aircraft via the US Government allowed the RAAF to take advantage of the superior purchasing power of the US military, and reduced the service's project management requirements. This led to a complicated arrangement whereby the aircraft were ordered by the US Government, delivered to the US Navy, and then transferred to the RAAF once initial flight testing had taken place. The process functioned smoothly and was cost effective.

== Production ==
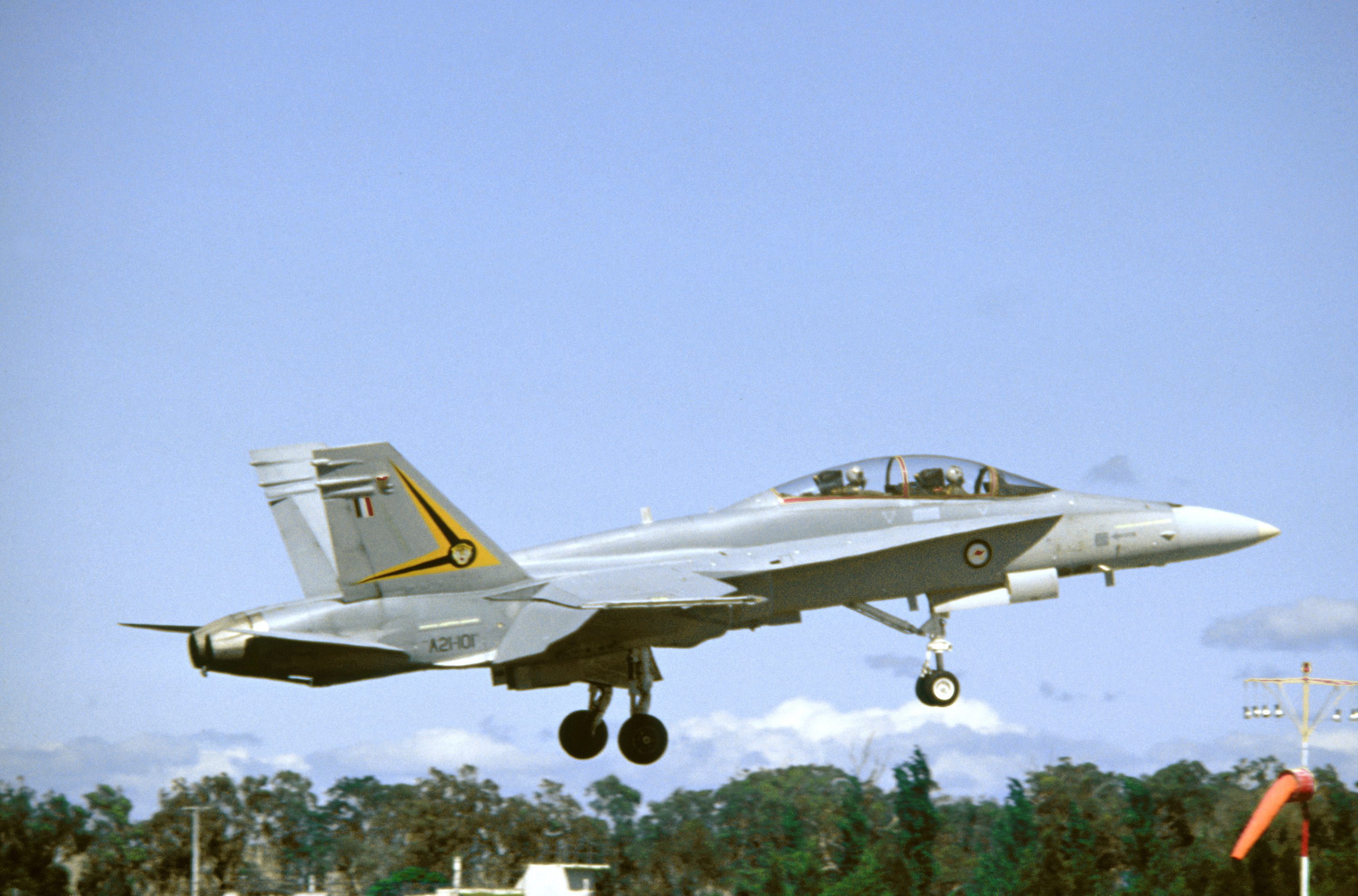
One of the RAAF's first F/A-18Bs in October 1985

The RAAF's order of 75 Hornets comprised 57 single-seat A variant fighters and 18 two-seat B variant operational training aircraft. It was planned that each of the three fighter squadrons and the single operational conversion unit that were to operate the F/A-18 would be allocated 16 aircraft, of which 12 were expected to be operational at any time while the other four were undergoing maintenance. The remaining eleven Hornets were labelled the "half-life attrition buy" and would replace the aircraft that were expected to have been lost by 2000; as it happened, this greatly exceeded the RAAF's actual losses. Deliveries were planned to start in late 1984 and be completed in 1990. The total cost of the F/A-18 program, including the aircraft, spare parts, other equipment and modifications to the RAAF's fighter bases, was calculated as A$2.427 billion in August 1981, but was rapidly revised upwards due to the depreciation of the Australian dollar at this time.

The Australian Hornets were very similar to the standard US Navy variants, but incorporated a number of minor modifications. These included the addition of an instrument landing system/VHF omnidirectional range (ILS/VOR) system, a high-frequency radio, a different ejection seat harness and the deletion of all equipment used only to launch the aircraft from catapults. In addition, two of the Australian aircraft were fitted with flight-test instrumentation so that they could be used as part of trials.

The Government sought to use the Mirage III replacement program as a means to increase the capabilities of Australia's manufacturing industry. Accordingly, it was decided to build the aircraft in Australia, though it was recognised that this would lead to higher costs than if the fighters were purchased directly from the United States. While the first four RAAF Hornets were built in the United States, the remainder were assembled at the Government Aircraft Factories (GAF) plant at Avalon Airport in Victoria, and their engines were produced by the Commonwealth Aircraft Corporation at Fishermans Bend in Melbourne. Another twelve Australian companies were involved in other stages of the project. These firms were sub-contracted to McDonnell Douglas and the other major US companies that produced components for the F/A-18, and had to comply with the requirements of the FMS program. The Australian Government hoped that Singapore and New Zealand would purchase Australian-built Hornets, but this did not eventuate. The Canadian Government expressed interest in purchasing 25 Australian-built F/A-18As in 1988 in order to increase its force of these aircraft after they had ceased to be manufactured in the United States, but this did not lead to any sales.

F/A-18A and B variant deliveries
| Year | F/A-18A | F/A-18B | Total |
|---|---|---|---|
| 1985 | 1 | 7 | 8 |
| 1986 | 12 | 0 | 12 |
| 1987 | 7 | 7 | 14 |
| 1988 | 21 | 4 | 25 |
| 1989 | 12 | 0 | 12 |
| 1990 | 4 | 0 | 4 |
| Total | 57 | 18 | 75 |

The Australian Hornets began to roll off the production lines in 1984. The first two aircraft (serial numbers A21-101 and A21-102) were entirely built at McDonnell Douglas's factory in St. Louis, and were handed over to the RAAF on 29 October 1984. These aircraft remained in the United States until May 1985 for training and trials purposes. The next two Australian Hornets (A21-103 and A21-104) were also built at St. Louis, but were then disassembled and flown to Avalon in June 1984 on board a USAF Lockheed C-5 Galaxy. The aircraft were then reassembled, and A21-103 was rolled out at a ceremony attended by Prime Minister Bob Hawke and the Chief of the Air Staff, Air Marshal David Evans, on 16 November. However, the aircraft's initial test flight was delayed until 26 February 1985 by a demarcation dispute over which category of pilot was permitted to fly the aircraft.

In order to meet production targets, GAF was required to complete 1.5 Hornets per month. Production fell behind schedule during the first half of 1987, however, as a result of inefficiencies at the company's factory and industrial relations problems. GAF was able to accelerate production later in the year, though some components that were planned to be manufactured in Australia were purchased from companies in the United States instead. The final cost of the Hornet project was A$4.668 billion; after adjusting for the depreciation of the Australian dollar this was $186 million less than the initial estimate.

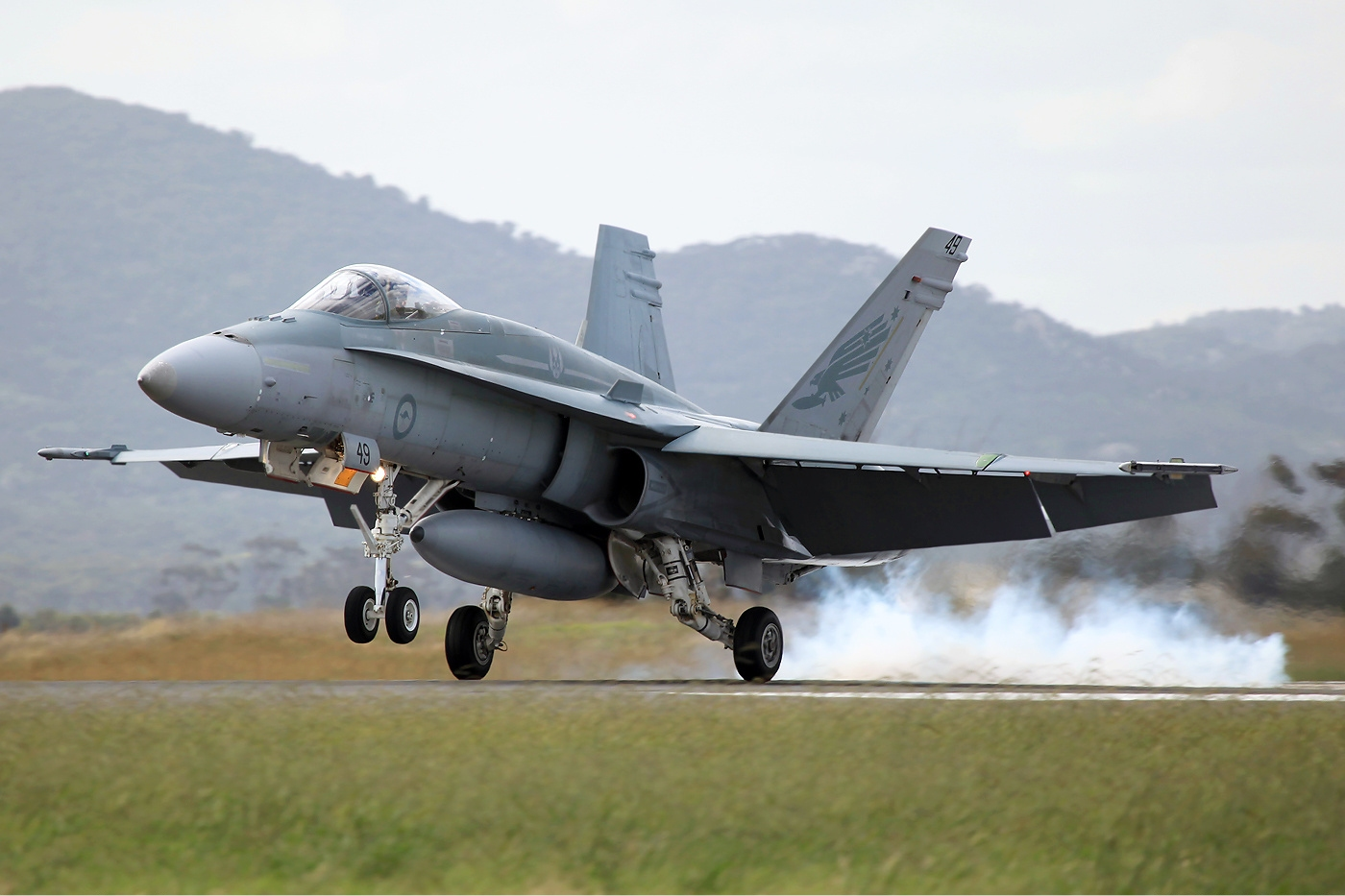
An F/A-18A (A21-49) landing in 2011

The RAAF began to accept Hornets into service in 1985. A21-103 was formally delivered on 4 May of that year. Two weeks later, A21-101 and 102 were flown from Naval Air Station Lemoore in California to RAAF Base Williamtown in New South Wales between 16 and 17 May 1985. This ferry flight was conducted as a non-stop journey, and USAF McDonnell Douglas KC-10 Extender tankers refuelled each of the Hornets 15 times as they crossed the Pacific. As of 2005 this remained the longest single flight to have been undertaken by F/A-18s. Despite the delays to production in 1987, the final Australian Hornet (A21-57) was delivered on schedule at a ceremony held in Canberra on 16 May 1990. The F/A-18As were allocated serial numbers A21-1 through to A21-57 and the F/A-18Bs were allocated A21-101 to A21-118.

A major capital works program was also undertaken to prepare RAAF bases for the Hornets. Over $150 million was spent upgrading the runways, hangars and maintenance facilities at RAAF Base Williamtown, which has been the main F/A-18 base throughout the aircraft's service. The pre-existing airfield at RAAF Base Tindal in the Northern Territory was also developed into a major air base between 1985 and 1988 at a cost of $215 million, so that it could accommodate No. 75 Squadron. Until this time the squadron had been stationed at RAAF Base Darwin which, due to its location on Australia's north coast, was vulnerable to damage from cyclones and difficult to defend during wartime.

Owing to concerns over the airworthiness of the RAAF's General Dynamics F-111 bombers and delays to the Lockheed Martin F-35 Lightning II program, the Australian Government ordered 24 F/A-18F Super Hornets in 2006. This design is significantly different from the original (or "classic") Hornet. The RAAF's first Super Hornets entered service in 2010 and deliveries were completed the next year. In 2013 the Australian Government ordered 12 Boeing EA-18G Growler electronic warfare variants of the Super Hornet, and all were delivered to the RAAF between 2015 and 2017.

== Maintenance and upgrades ==
Maintenance of the RAAF's Hornets is carried out by both air force personnel and civilian contractors. Until the early 1990s, all routine servicing and a significant proportion of intensive "deeper maintenance" was undertaken by the air force. However, the share of intensive maintenance tasks outsourced to the private sector was increased during the 1990s under the RAAF-wide Commercial Support Program. Under current arrangements, the four Hornet-equipped units undertake all routine servicing and some of the more complex deeper maintenance tasks. The remainder of the deeper maintenance work, as well as all major refurbishments and upgrade projects, are carried out by commercial firms. BAE Systems has been the lead contractor for Hornet deeper maintenance since 2003, and Boeing Australia has also provided maintenance services for the aircraft since it won a contract to do so in 2010. In August 2017, Boeing's contract was extended until the planned retirement of the Hornets in 2021, with the company also gaining responsibility for integrating weapons onto the type. This change was made to free up RAAF personnel for activities associated with introducing the F-35 into service.

The RAAF's Hornet fleet received few modifications until the late 1990s. During this period, the AN/AAS-38 "Nite Hawk" targeting pod was the only new system fitted to the aircraft. Australia also managed to break the codes which prevented modifications to the Hornet's radar software after the US Government refused to share them. This enabled the software to be adjusted so that all of the aircraft operated by Australia's neighbours could be designated as hostile. In his final address to Parliament, former Minister for Defence Kim Beazley stated that he had raised access to the radar system repeatedly with the US Government during the 1980s, and "in the end, we spied on them and we extracted the codes ourselves".

Several Asian countries introduced Mikoyan MiG-29 fighters into service during the 1990s, raising concerns that the RAAF's aircraft would be outclassed. The air force considered replacing the Hornet with the Eurofighter Typhoon or Boeing F/A-18E/F Super Hornet, but concluded that both aircraft were technologically immature. As a result, it was decided to upgrade the Hornets.

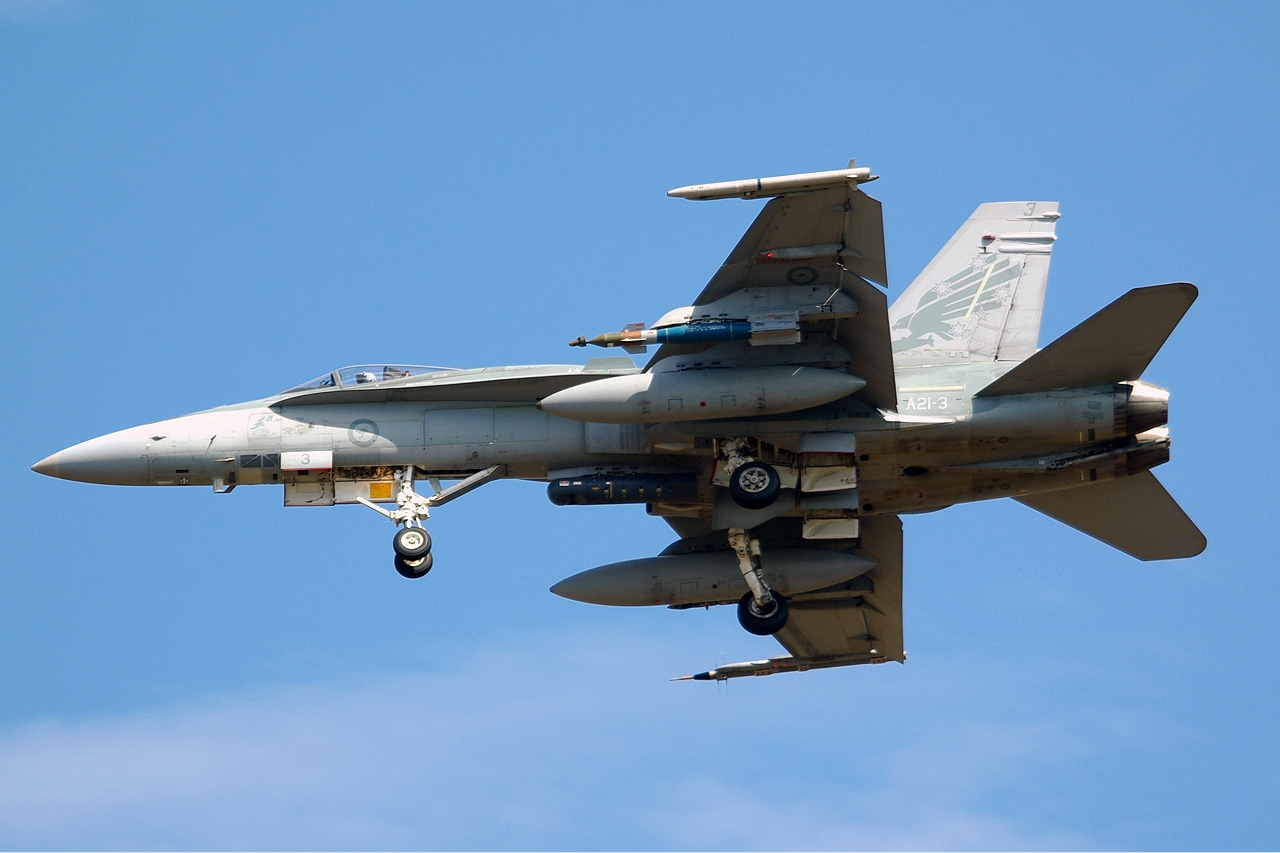
Hornet A21-3 in August 2010. The aircraft is carrying a LITENING targeting pod, ASRAAM missiles, training bombs and external fuel tanks.

The Hornet Upgrade Program (HUG) began in 1999, and had three main phases. In Phase 1, which ran from mid-2000 through 2002, the Hornets' computer systems, navigation system and radio were replaced. The aircraft were also fitted to operate the ASRAAM air-to-air missile; these weapons replaced the AIM-9 Sidewinder. HUG Phase 2 comprised four sub-elements and sought to improve the Hornets' combat performance. During Phase 2.1 the APG-65 radar was replaced with the improved AN/APG-73, and the aircraft were fitted with a secure voice encryption communications system and various updates to their computer systems. In HUG Phase 2.2, the most important element of the program, the Hornets were fitted with a Joint Helmet Mounted Cueing System, equipment needed to share data through the Link 16 network, a new countermeasures dispensing system and several upgrades to their cockpit displays. All of the Hornets were upgraded to this standard between January 2005 and December 2006. In Phase 2.3, an improved Electronic Counter Measures system was fitted to the Hornets; the AN/ALR-2002 was originally selected, but proved unsuccessful. It was replaced by the ALR-67 Radar Warning Receiver in late 2006. As of early 2012, 14 Hornets had been fitted with the system and the remainder were scheduled to receive it by the end of the year. During HUG Phase 2.4 the Hornets were modified to be able to use the AN/AAQ-28(v) "LITENING" targeting pod and 37 of these systems were purchased; this phase was completed in 2007.

The third stage of the Hornet Upgrade Program sought to rectify airframe damage. HUG Phase 3.1 involved minor structural work to all aircraft as they passed through other phases of the program. The centre fuselages of the ten Hornets assessed as suffering the greatest amount of structural damage were replaced in HUG Phase 3.2. It was originally intended that all the RAAF's Hornets would receive new centre fuselages, but the scope of this phase of the program was reduced after it was found that the number of man-hours needed to upgrade each aircraft was much greater than originally estimated. The ten aircraft were upgraded at an L-3 Communications facility in Canada, and all were returned to service by June 2010.

The long-running HUG process complicated the RAAF's management of its fleet of F/A-18s. At any one time, the capabilities of individual aircraft differed considerably depending on their upgrades. Accordingly, the long-standing arrangement where aircraft were almost permanently assigned to each squadron was replaced by a system where they were pooled. Attempts to allocate Hornets with similar levels of modifications from the common pool to each squadron were not successful.

== Armament ==
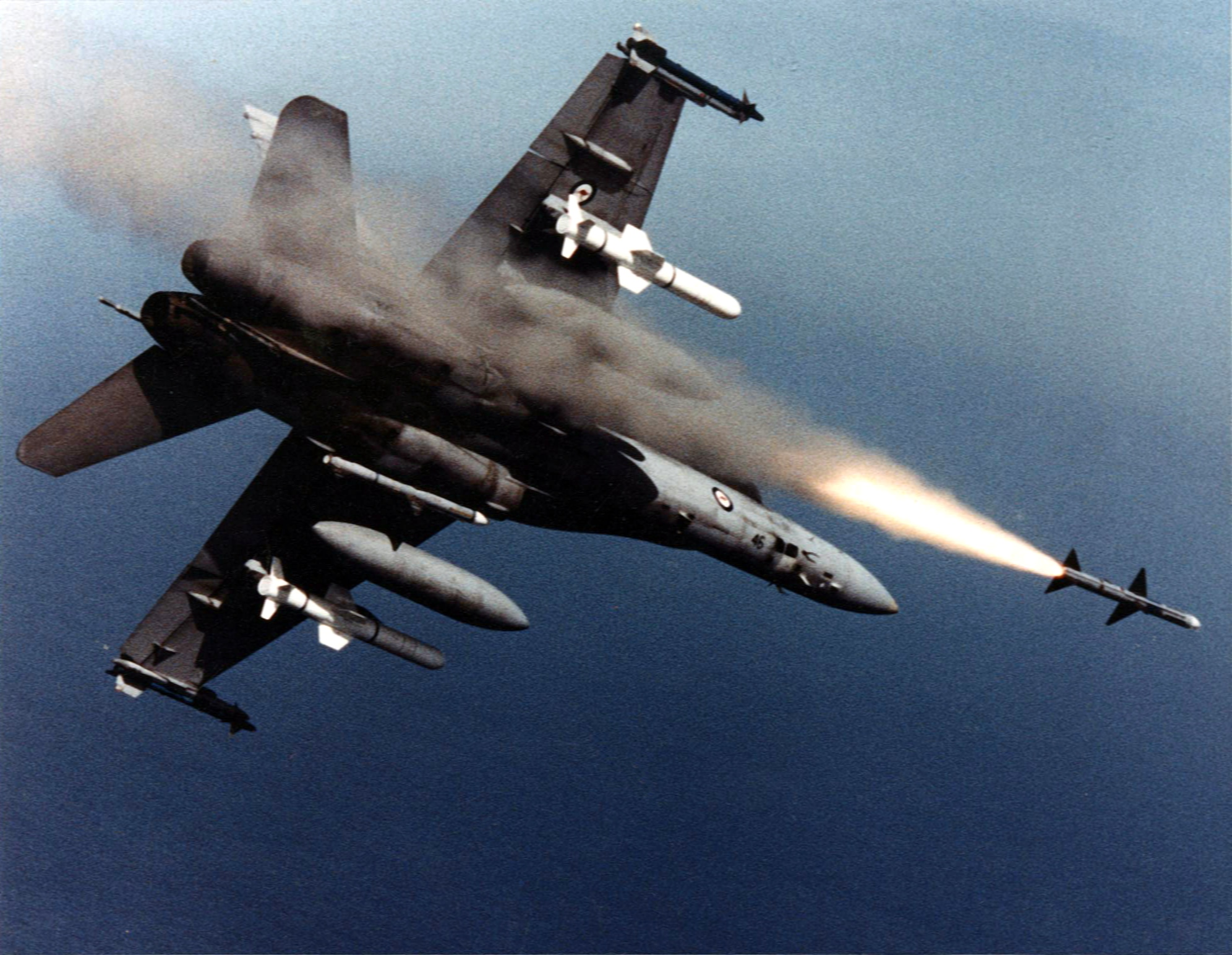
An RAAF F/A-18 Hornet firing an AIM-7M Sparrow missile in 1990. The aircraft is also carrying two Harpoon missiles, two Sidewinder missiles and another Sparrow.

The RAAF's Hornets have been fitted with several different types of air-to-air weapons. The aircraft are equipped with an internal M61A1 cannon for use against air and ground targets; 578 rounds can be carried for this weapon. During the initial years of the Hornets' service, the aircraft were equipped with AIM-9M Sidewinder short-range air-to-air missiles and AIM-7M Sparrow medium-range air-to-air missiles. The Sparrows were replaced by the AIM-120 AMRAAM in 2002, and in 2004 the Sidewinders were replaced by ASRAAMs. The older missiles are occasionally used in training exercises, however.

A variety of unguided and guided weapons can also be used against ground targets. The Hornets carry Mark 82, Mark 83 and Mark 84 bombs, as well as GBU-10, GBU-12 and GBU-16 Paveway II laser-guided bombs. In addition, the aircraft have operated bombs fitted with JDAM guidance kits since 2008. The long-ranged JDAM-ER variant of these bombs were ordered in 2011 and entered service in 2015. During exercises the Hornets carry BDU-33 and BDU-57 LGTR training bombs. Since November 2011, the RAAF's Hornets have also been equipped with AGM-158 JASSM cruise missiles. The F/A-18s' main weapon in the maritime strike role is the Harpoon anti-ship missile; the RAAF initially operated the Block IC variant of this missile, but purchased Block II variants in 2003. In addition to these weapons, the Hornets can also be fitted with 330-US-gallon (1,200 L) drop tanks to extend their range.

== Operational history ==
=== Introduction into service ===
Four RAAF units converted to the Hornet between 1985 and 1988. The first 14 Hornets were allocated to No. 2 Operational Conversion Unit (2OCU) at RAAF Base Williamtown, and were used to train the pilots and instructors needed to convert the RAAF's three fighter squadrons to the aircraft. 2OCU's first Hornet operational conversion course began on 19 August 1985. In addition to the unit's training activities, 2OCU aircraft travelled widely around Australia and South East Asia during 1985 and 1986 to showcase the new aircraft. No. 3 Squadron was the first fighter unit to convert from the Mirage III, and became operational with the Hornet in August 1986. It was followed by No. 77 Squadron in June 1987 and No. 75 Squadron in May 1988. No. 81 Wing, whose headquarters is located at Williamtown, has commanded these four units since they converted to the F/A-18. As of 2012, 2OCU, No. 3 and No. 77 Squadrons are stationed at Williamtown and No. 75 Squadron is located at Tindal. In addition, two Hornets are allocated to the Aircraft Research and Development Unit at RAAF Base Edinburgh in South Australia.

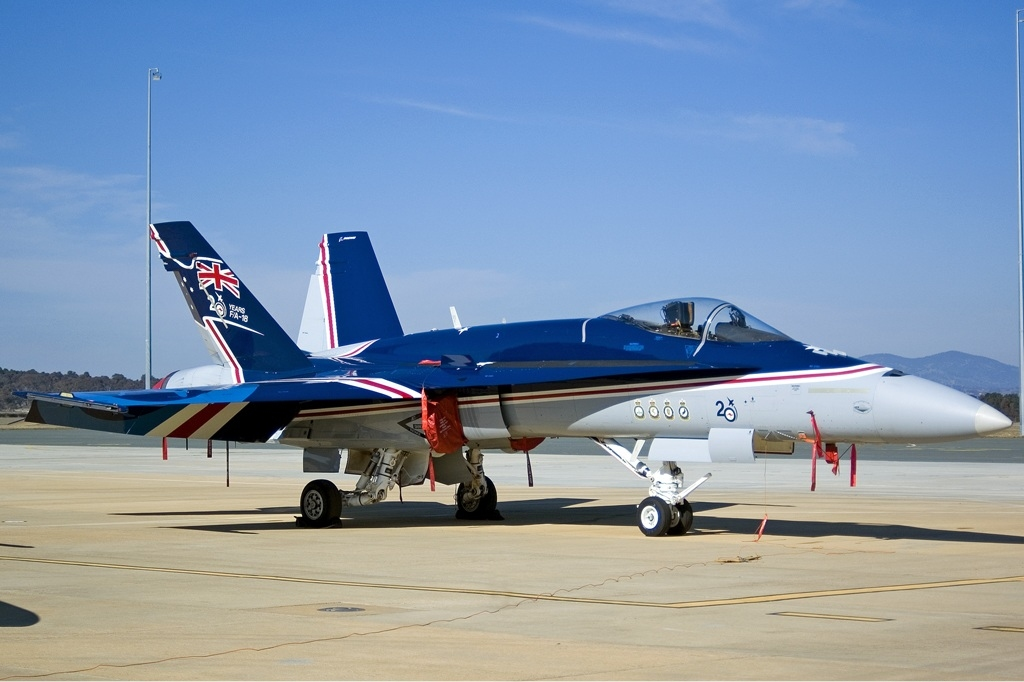
An F/A-18A in special colours to mark the 20th anniversary of the type's introduction into RAAF service

The RAAF's Mirage III pilots generally found the process of converting to the Hornet to be straightforward. While the F/A-18 was considered to be easier to fly, its more sophisticated avionics and weapons systems required improved cockpit workload management skills. The Hornets have also proven to be mechanically reliable and easy to maintain, though shortages of spare parts reduced availability rates during the early years of their service with the RAAF. The updates installed as part of the HUG process have further simplified maintenance procedures. In recent years, however, the aging aircraft have required much more servicing than was the case in the past.

To extend the Hornets' range, four of the RAAF's six Boeing 707 transport aircraft were converted to tankers in the early 1990s; the first Boeing 707 tanker entered service in 1990. The tankers were operated by No. 33 Squadron and supported the Hornet units until the 707s were retired in 2008. These aircraft were replaced with KC-30A tanker-transports in 2011.

The RAAF has at times suffered from shortfalls of Hornet-qualified pilots. The service began to experience shortages of F/A-18 and F-111 fast-jet pilots in the mid-1980s due to competition from commercial airlines and relatively low recruitment rates. By June 1999 the three operational Hornet-equipped squadrons had only 40 pilots, which was fewer than the number of aircraft allocated to these units. The RAAF claimed that the squadrons were able to meet their readiness targets, however. To overcome this shortfall, the RAAF gave its fast-jet units a higher priority for aircrew, implemented measures to reduce separation rates, and recruited pilots from other countries. These reforms coincided with reduced demand for civil pilots following the 11 September attacks, and by late 2003 the RAAF's fast-jet units were at near full strength. A 2010 article in the magazine Australian Aviation stated that No. 3 Squadron typically had "about 18 pilots on strength" at any point in time. At this time the total strength of the squadron, including air and ground crew, was around 300 personnel.

=== Training ===
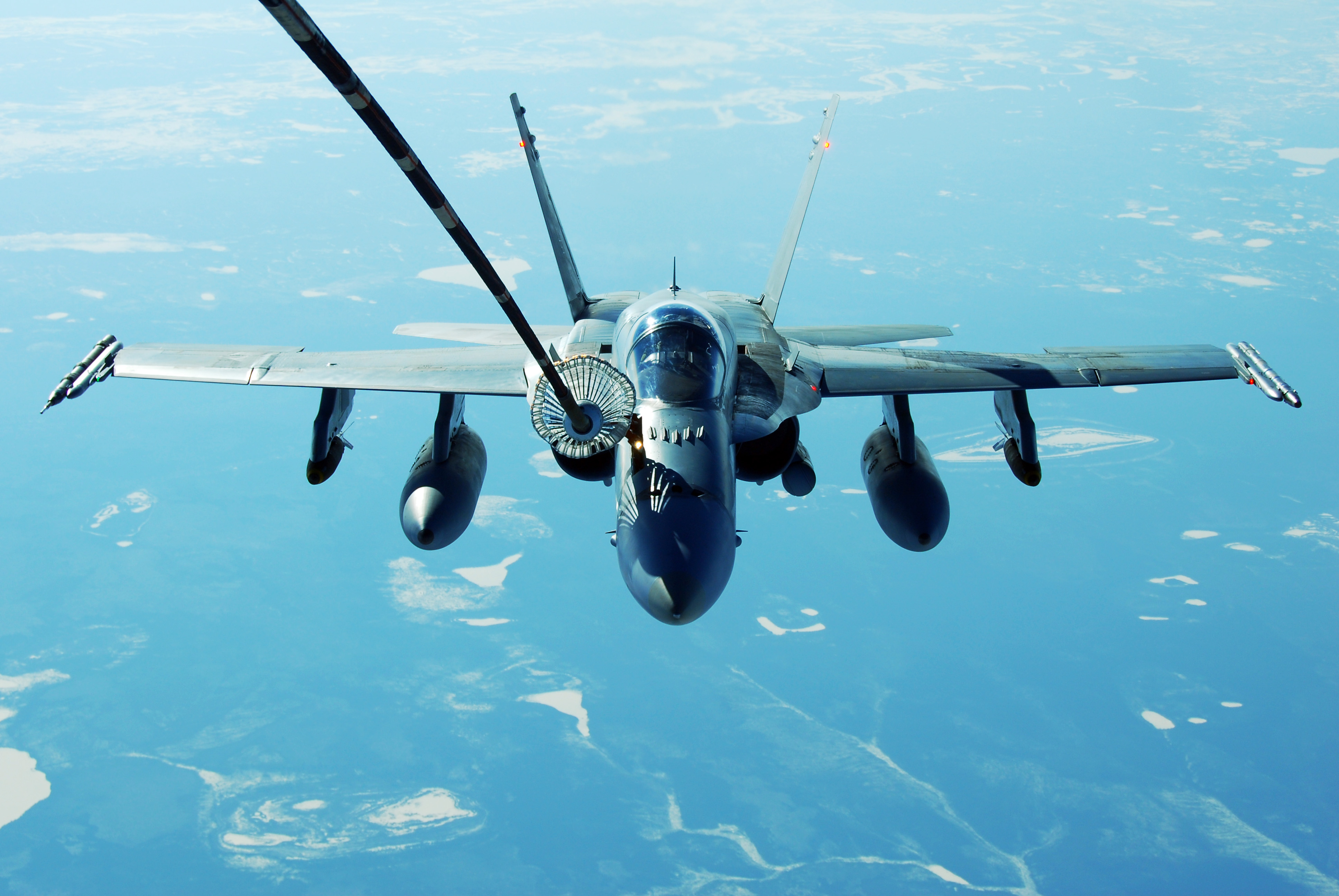
A RAAF Hornet refuelling over Alaska in 2008

As the Hornets are multi-role fighters, their pilots practise a wide range of tasks during peacetime training. Each year the three Hornet squadrons rotate between four-month training blocks focused on air-to-air combat, air-to-ground tactics and Australian Defence Force support tasks. The units undertake the air-to-air and air-to-ground blocks before assuming responsibility for Australian Defence Force support (which involves operating with the Australian Army and Royal Australian Navy). No. 81 Wing's headquarters oversees this training program and monitors adherence to common standards and procedures. Training sorties may include such tasks as defending air bases, infrastructure and shipping from enemy aircraft, attacking naval and ground targets, and practising in-flight refuelling. More unusual tasks such as dropping naval mines have also been practised at times. Major exercises often involve other RAAF units and aircraft, as well as units from the Army and Navy and contingents from other countries.

As part of their regular training activities, F/A-18 Hornets operate in different parts of Australia and the Asia-Pacific region. Regular deployments are made to Singapore and RMAF Butterworth in Malaysia as part of Integrated Air Defence System exercises. In addition, RAAF F/A-18s have participated in exercises in the Philippines, Thailand and the United States. These deployments have seen Australian fighter squadrons range as far afield as Eielson Air Force Base in Alaska, where they took part in Red Flag – Alaska exercises in 2008 and 2011.

Four of the RAAF's Hornets were destroyed in flying accidents during the late 1980s and early 1990s. A21-104 was the first aircraft to be lost when it crashed at Great Palm Island in Queensland on 18 November 1987; its pilot was killed. The next loss occurred on 2 August 1990 when two No. 75 Squadron Hornets (A21-29 and A21-42) collided. A21-42 crashed, killing the unit's commanding officer; the other aircraft was damaged but managed to return to base. On 5 June 1991 A21-41 crashed 100 kilometres (62 mi) north-east of Weipa, Queensland, killing its pilot. A21-106 was the fourth aircraft to be lost when it crashed inland from Shoalwater Bay in Queensland on 19 May 1992 – its pilot and a passenger from the Defence Science and Technology Organisation died. As of September 2017, all of the remaining 71 F/A-18s were still in service. Aviation writer Nigel Pittaway has noted that the type has "enjoyed an exemplary safety record during its RAAF service", especially when compared to the loss of 41 of the RAAF's 116 Mirages due to accidents. Similarly, Andrew McLaughlin noted in 2019 that the loss of four Hornets to this time was "a remarkable endorsement of the aircraft's rugged design and systems redundancy" given that the RAAF had projected that eleven would have been destroyed by 2004 when the aircraft were first acquired.

=== Deployments ===
In late 1990, consideration was given to deploying a squadron of F/A-18s to the Middle East as part of an expanded Australian contribution to the Gulf War. The Department of Defence opposed dispatching the aircraft on the grounds that doing so would greatly strain the fighter force in Australia, and this option was not adopted by the government. As a result, the Hornets' only role in the war was to support the training of the Royal Australian Navy warships which were sent to the Gulf by conducting mock attacks on the vessels as they sailed from Sydney to Perth.

During late 1999, No. 75 Squadron was placed on alert to provide close air support and air defence for the international forces deployed to East Timor as part of INTERFET. While Indonesian forces posed a potential threat to this force, no fighting eventuated and the Hornets were not required.

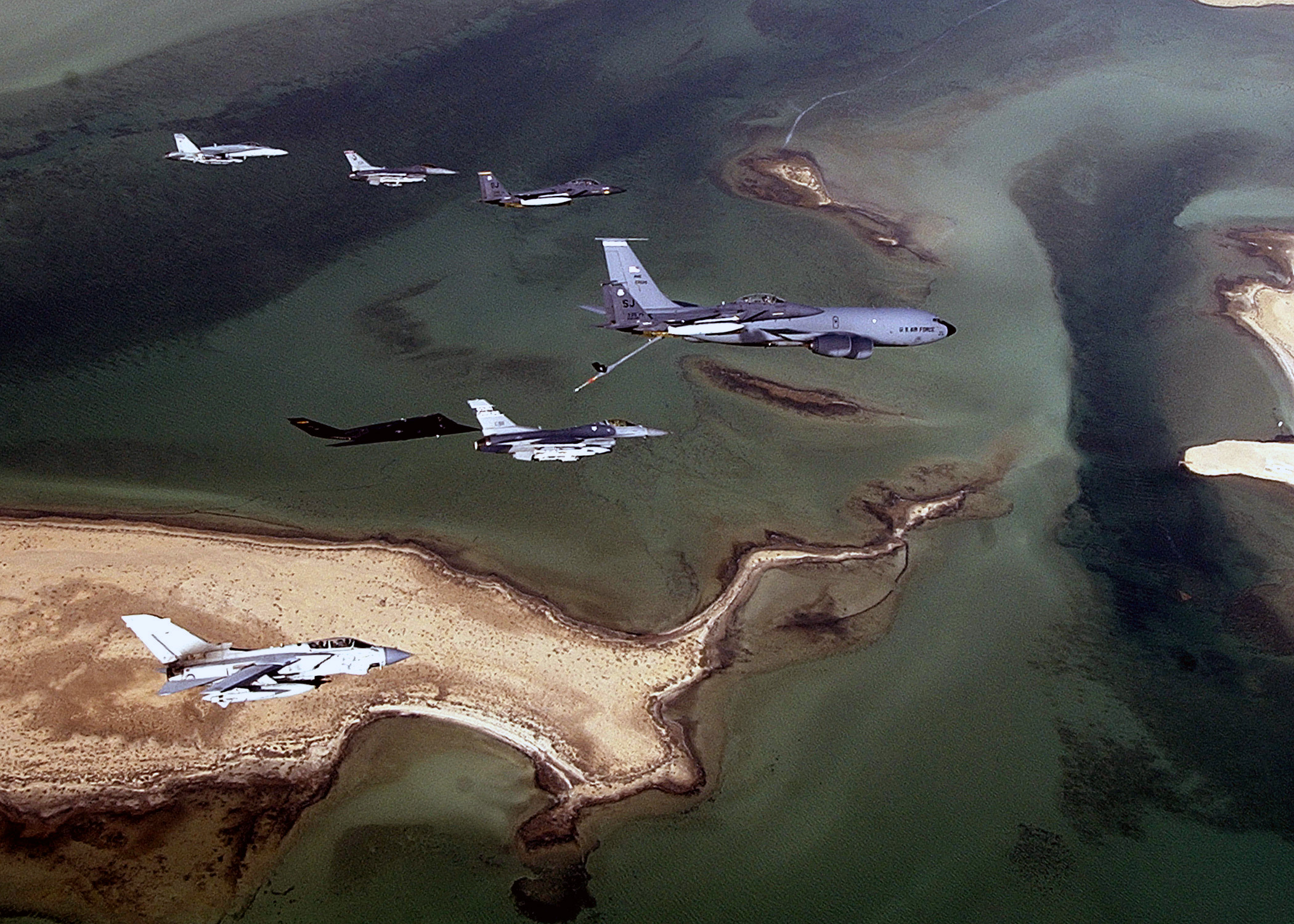
An Australian Hornet (at top) flying in formation with US and British aircraft on 14 April 2003 following the invasion of Iraq

The first operational deployment of RAAF Hornets took place in 2001. Following the 11 September terrorist attacks, the Australian Government agreed to deploy F/A-18s to protect the major USAF air base on the Indian Ocean island of Diego Garcia, which was being used to mount operations in Afghanistan. Four No. 77 Squadron Hornets and 70 personnel departed for the island on 9 November. No. 3 Squadron pilots and ground crew relieved the No. 77 Squadron personnel in early February 2002. RAAF Hornets were not assigned to the War in Afghanistan as at the time they were less capable than other available coalition aircraft. While the F/A-18s were occasionally scrambled in response to reports of aircraft near the base, no threat developed. The detachment returned to Australia on 21 May 2002.

No. 75 Squadron formed part of the Australian contribution to the 2003 invasion of Iraq. The squadron began initial planning for this deployment in December 2002, and intensive training was undertaken from January 2003. To improve the unit's readiness, air and ground crew as well as aircraft were also posted to No. 75 Squadron from other units. The Australian Government announced on 1 February that it would begin deploying RAAF aircraft, including a squadron of F/A-18s, to the Middle East. No. 75 Squadron departed from Tindal on 13 February, and arrived at Al Udeid Air Base in Qatar on the 16th of the month. The 14 F/A-18A Hornets selected for this deployment had received the HUG 2.1 package of upgrades and recently completed major servicing. These upgrades allowed the F/A-18s to operate alongside other coalition aircraft. In addition to No. 75 Squadron, several experienced Hornet pilots were also posted to the USAF Combined Air and Space Operations Center in the Middle East to provide advice on how to make the best use of the squadron.

The Australian Hornets saw combat in several roles during the Iraq War. Following the outbreak of war on 20 March, No. 75 Squadron was initially used to escort high-value Coalition aircraft, such as tankers and airborne early warning and control aircraft. As it rapidly became clear that the Iraqi Air Force posed no threat, from 21 March No. 75 Squadron also began to conduct air interdiction sorties against Iraqi forces. These sorties were initially flown in support of the United States Army's V Corps, but the squadron was rarely assigned any targets to attack. As a result, the Australian commanders in the Middle East had No. 75 Squadron reassigned to support the United States Marine Corps' I Marine Expeditionary Force. At this time the squadron also began flying close air support sorties. During the first two weeks of the war the squadron typically flew twelve sorties per day. To avoid pilot fatigue, additional aircrew were posted to the Middle East from Australia. The number of sorties dropped to between six and ten per day from 5 April onwards as the American forces closed on Baghdad and few targets remained in southern Iraq. On 12 April, No. 75 Squadron supported elements of the Special Air Service Regiment and 4th Battalion, Royal Australian Regiment, which occupied Al Asad Airbase. During the last weeks of the war the squadron continued to fly sorties across western, central and southern Iraq to support British and American forces. In several of the squadron's operations in the final week of the war, the Hornets made low altitude and high speed passes over Iraqi positions to encourage their defenders to surrender. No. 75 Squadron conducted its final combat sorties on 27 April. During the war the squadron flew 350 combat missions (including 670 individual sorties) and dropped 122 laser-guided bombs. No. 75 Squadron did not suffer any casualties, and all 14 Hornets returned to Tindal on 14 May 2003.

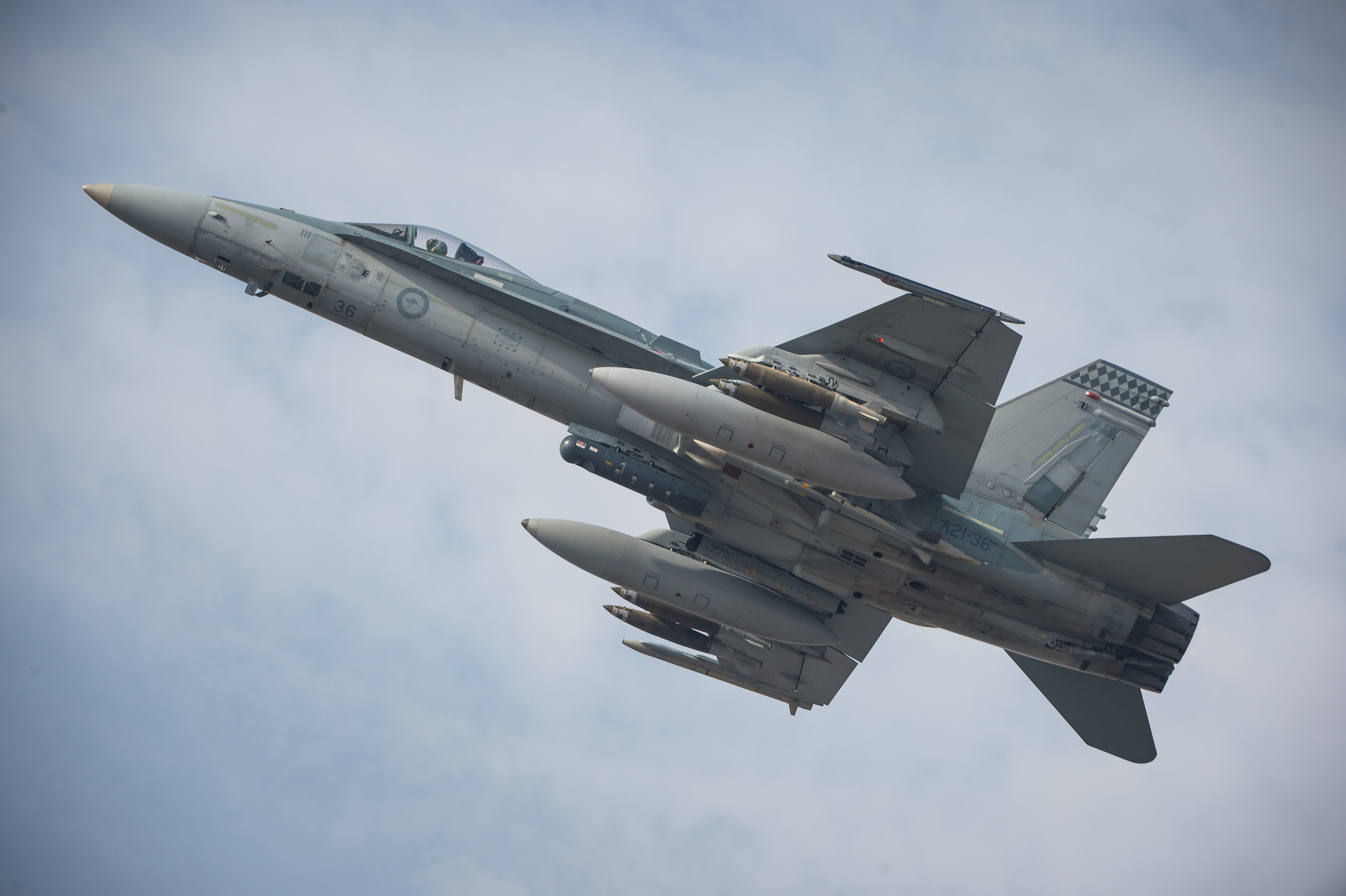
An Australian F/A-18 Hornet taking off for a mission over Iraq in March 2017

RAAF Hornets have also provided air defence for several high-profile events in Australia since the 11 September attacks. In 2002, Hornets patrolled over the Commonwealth Heads of Government Meeting (CHOGM) at Coolum Beach, Queensland; this was the first time RAAF aircraft had flown air defence sorties over Australia since World War II. On 22 and 23 October that year a detachment of Hornets patrolled over Canberra during US President George W. Bush's visit to the city. A detachment of aircraft from No. 77 Squadron was deployed to RAAF Base East Sale in March 2006 to protect the Commonwealth Games, which were being held in Melbourne. In September 2007, Hornets patrolled over Sydney during the APEC leaders meeting there. Eight Hornets were also deployed from Williamtown to RAAF Base Pearce in October 2011 to protect the CHOGM meeting in nearby Perth. On 16 and 17 November that year, Hornets operated over Canberra and Darwin while President Barack Obama was present.

In March 2015, six F/A-18As from No. 75 Squadron were deployed to the Middle East as part of Operation Okra, replacing a detachment of Super Hornets. No. 81 Wing's involvement in Operation Okra concluded in May 2017, with No. 1 Squadron resuming responsibility for this task. By this time all of the wing's three squadrons had completed at least one rotation to the Middle East: No. 3 Squadron was deployed once, and the other two squadrons conducted two deployments. The squadrons used a common 'pool' of aircraft during these deployments, with either six or seven Hornets being stationed in the Middle East at any time. The aircraft were typically deployed for eight months before rotating back to Australia when becoming due for major servicing. Members of the three Hornet-equipped squadrons served five or six-month rotations, and ground crew from 2OCU and No. 81 Wing's workshops were also deployed to fill specialist roles. The Hornets attacked ISIL personnel and facilities in both Iraq and Syria, including in support of Iraqi forces engaged in the Battle of Mosul. Overall, No. 81 Wing conducted 1,973 sorties over Iraq and Syria during which 1,961 munitions were released. Despite the age of the aircraft and the harsh environmental conditions in the Middle East, the detachment sustained a very high serviceability rate.

=== Retirement ===
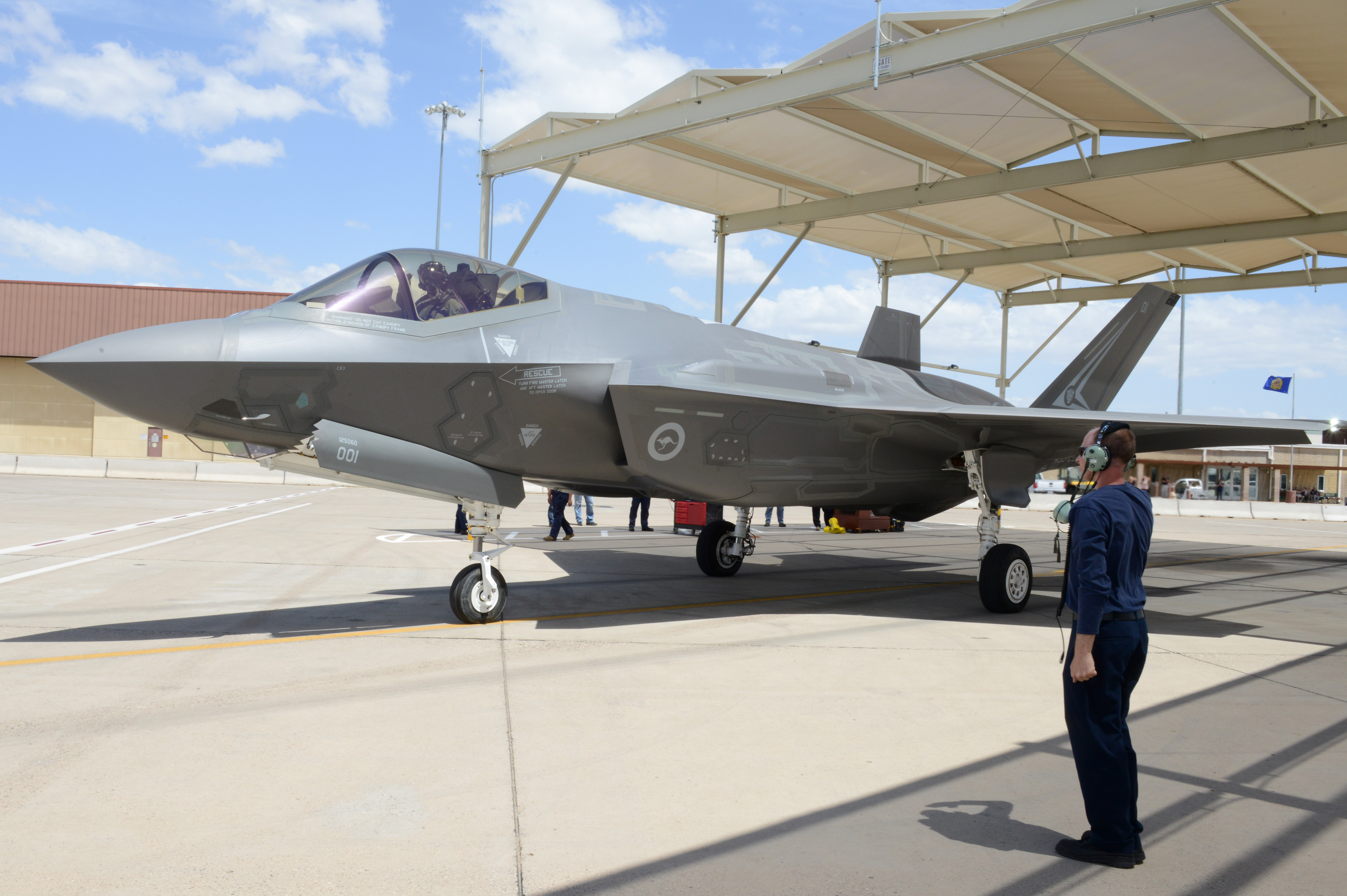
One of the RAAF's first Lockheed Martin F-35A Lightning IIs in 2015

While the Hornet Upgrade Program was successful, it was expected that the aircraft would become increasingly expensive to operate as they aged, and improvements to the fighter aircraft and air defences operated by other countries would reduce their combat effectiveness. The Australian Government decided to replace the RAAF's F/A-18 Hornets with Lockheed Martin F-35A Lightning II fighters, with this process commencing in 2018. The acquisition process is designated Project AIR 6000 Phase 2A/B, and will involve the purchase of 72 F-35A fighters to equip three squadrons and an operational training unit. All of the F/A-18A and Bs were scheduled to be retired by 2022. The RAAF's Hornet sustainability planning was designed to allow the type to be retained in service for longer if the F-35 program experienced further delays.

No. 3 Squadron was the first Hornet unit to be reequipped, and ceased operating the type in December 2017. It began to transition to the F-35 in early 2018. The squadron's Hornets and most of its personnel were transferred to No. 77 Squadron, which was expanded from two to three flights as part of this change. 2OCU completed its final Hornet conversion training course in 2019, and ceased flying the type in December that year. No. 77 Squadron ceased Hornet operations in December 2020. As of May 2020, No. 75 Squadron was to begin converting to the F-35 in January 2022.

The RAAF implemented several measures to keep the Hornets in service until the F-35As were ready. These included a structural refurbishment program, increased monitoring of fatigue-related issues as well as repainting the aircraft and frequently washing them to reduce the risks posed by corrosion. In 2015 the Defence Science and Technology Group revised the fatigue damage algorithm used for determining the Hornets' structural condition which found that the airframes were less fatigued than previously believed, and so able to remain in service for a longer period than planned if necessary. This finding was accepted by the Directorate General Technical Airworthiness – Australian Defence Force. As of September 2017, none of the RAAF Hornets were subject to flying restrictions due to airframe fatigue. However, the cost of maintaining the aging aircraft in service was increasing. A 2017 article by Canadian defence analyst Christopher Cowan and Australian Strategic Policy Institute analyst Dr. Andrew Davies stated that the RAAF "has done an excellent job managing its Hornet fleet", with each aircraft having a unique plan to minimise airframe fatigue. At this time each of the Hornets had, on average, been flown for 4,200 hours, as compared to the nominal fatigue life of 6,000 hours for the type. In August 2019, the Hornet fleet passed the milestone of having flown 400,000 hours. At this time, several Hornets had been retired from service after becoming due for major servicing periods.

The Hornet was officially retired from RAAF service on 29 November 2021. A ceremony to mark the occasion took place that day at RAAF Base Williamtown. The fleet had been flown for almost 408,000 hours.

== Disposal ==
=== Royal Canadian Air Force ===
A21-53 in 2010; this was one of the first Australian Hornets to be transferred to Canada in 2019

The Australian Government is planning to sell the Hornets and associated spare parts after the type is retired from RAAF service. In August 2017, the Canadian Government initiated discussions to purchase a number of Australian F/A-18s to augment the Royal Canadian Air Force's fleet of similar McDonnell Douglas CF-18 Hornets in the event that a planned purchase of Super Hornets was cancelled as the result of a trade dispute. A Canadian delegation also visited Australia that month to inspect RAAF Hornets. The Canadian Government lodged a formal expression of interest to purchase Australian F/A-18s on 29 September 2017.

On 13 December 2017, Australian Minister for Defence Marise Payne confirmed the sale of 18 F/A-18 Hornets and associated spare parts to Canada. The Canadian Government announced at the same time that it had cancelled its plans to acquire Super Hornets. The Australian aircraft are being acquired to enable the RCAF to continue to meet its international commitments until a new fighter type is ordered and enters service. In June 2018, the Canadian Government requested a further seven Australian Hornets. These additional aircraft will be used as a source of spare parts. The sale of the 25 Hornets was finalised in early 2019, with the purchase price being CA$90 million. Of these aircraft, 18 will be issued to operational units and the remainder used for trials purposes and as a source of spare parts. After they arrive in Canada, the aircraft will be fitted with different ejection seats and software so that they are identical to CF-18s.

Deliveries of ex-RAAF Hornets to Canada began in February 2019. Two of the aircraft were flown to CFB Cold Lake in mid-February and handed over after they had formed part of the RAAF contingent at a Red Flag exercise in the United States. At this time, deliveries of the other 23 Hornets were scheduled to be completed in 2021. This schedule was dependent on progress with introducing the F-35 into Australian service. At least one other Hornet was handed over to Canada during 2019. In August 2020 it was reported that 18 ex-Australian aircraft would be among 36 RCAF Hornets to be placed through a modernisation program. The upgrades will include the installation of a AN/APG-79 active electronically scanned array radar and equipping the aircraft with AIM-9X Sidewinder air-to-air missiles and AGM-154 Joint Standoff Weapons.

Canada received the last of the former Australian Hornets it had purchased on 21 May 2021. By March 2022 eight of the aircraft were assigned to operational RCAF units.

=== Remaining aircraft ===
In March 2020 the Minister for Defence Industry Melissa Price announced that up to 46 ex-RAAF Hornets, as well as the entire associated spare parts and test equipment inventory, would be sold to the American company Air USA. This company provides air combat training to the US Government. Journalist Nigel Pittaway noted that if all of these aircraft are sold it would mean that none of the Hornets are preserved in Australian museums after the type leaves RAAF service. In May, the Department of Defence stated that the numbers which would be sold to Canada and Air USA had not yet been finalised. As of November 2021 it was not clear if the deal to sell Hornets to Air USA would proceed. The aircraft had still not been transferred in February 2023, but it was reported that the contract remained in place and Department of Defence still intended to deliver them. By this time Air USA had been rebranded as RAVN Aerospace.

In March 2023 Australian Financial Review correspondent Aaron Patrick wrote that the sale "appears to have fallen through" and called for the Hornets to be transferred to Ukraine as part of Australia's assistance to the country following the Russian invasion during 2022. It was reported in April 2023 that the Department of Defence had repeatedly refused to comment on the status of the sale to RAVN Aerospace. In May 2023 Australian Strategic Policy Institute analyst Malcom Davis stated that the Australian Hornets were stored at Andersen Air Force Base on the American island of Guam, and appeared to be in poor condition. Davis considers the aircraft to be too outdated to be suitable for Ukraine, and noted that the country has not requested them from Australia. In June the Australian Financial Review reported that the Australian Government was discussing donating the Hornets to Ukraine with the Ukrainian and United States governments. The US Government was reported to be supportive of this transfer. The story also stated that multiple experts considered the aircraft to be suitable for Ukraine and that they were being stored at RAAF Base Williamtown. ABC News reported also in June that the arrangement would require RAVN Aerospace to on-sell the aircraft to Ukraine, with the company being willing to do so. If the Hornets were provided to Ukraine it would have been the largest-ever transfer of Australian military equipment to another country.

The contract to sell former RAAF Hornets to RAVN Aerospace lapsed in December 2023 with none having been transferred. The Australian Financial Review reported that month that the Ukrainian Government intended to formally request the Australian Hornet fleet during negotiations with the US Government. In January 2024 the same newspaper reported that the Ukrainian Air Force was not interested in the aircraft, as it did not want to maintain donated fleets of both F-16s and F/A-18s. As a result, Ukraine did not request the Hornets in 2023 despite being encouraged by other countries to do so. The Ukrainian Ambassador to Australia noted in June 2024 that while some initial discussions regarding the Australian Hornets had taken place the aircraft were never explicitly requested as the Ukrainian Air Force wanted to focus its efforts on introducing F-16s into service.

Following the failure of the deal to sell the Hornets to RAVN Aerospace they were broken up and disposed of.

== Preservation ==
A21-22 on display in the Australian War Memorial

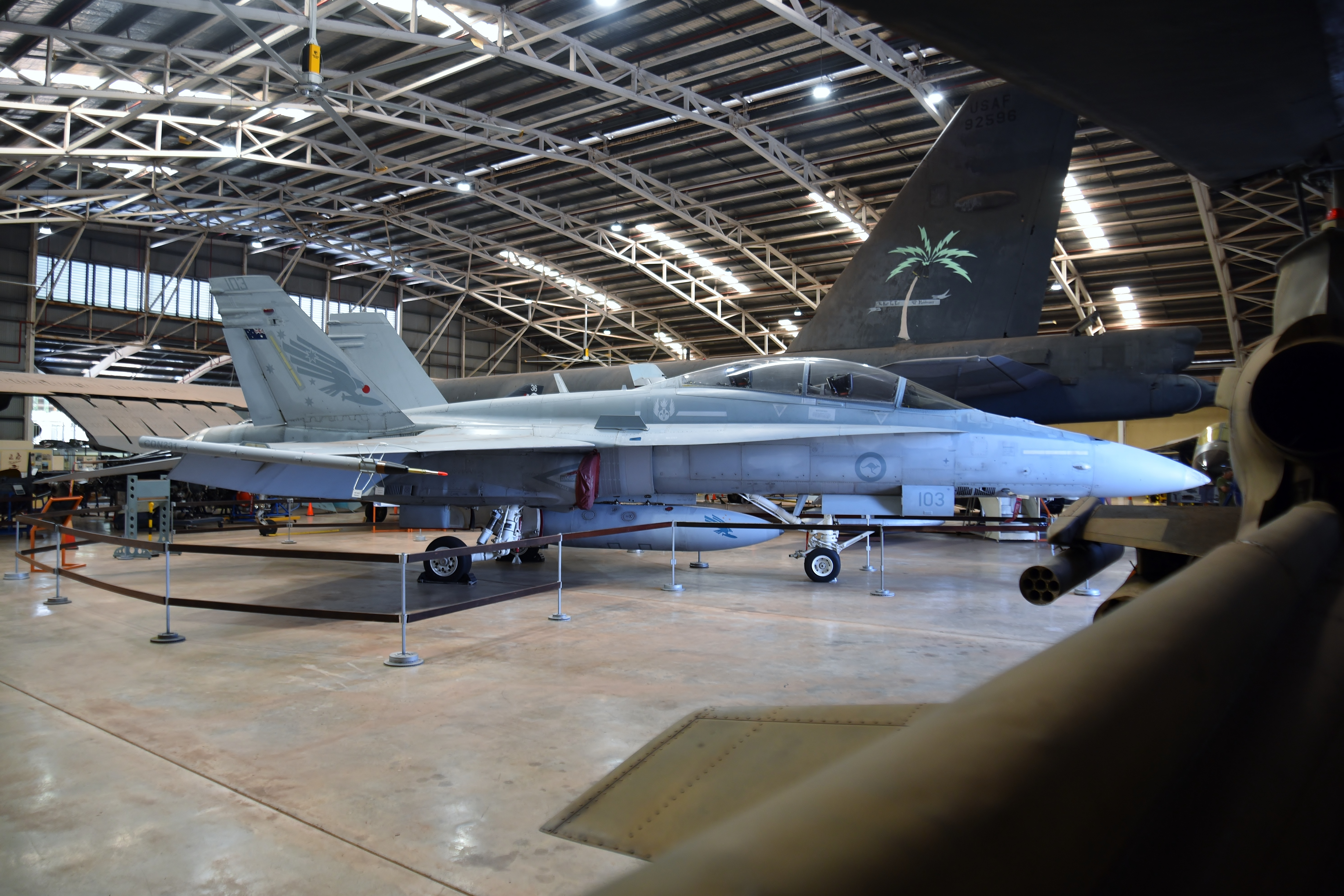
A21-103 on display at the Darwin Aviation Museum in 2023

In May 2020, the Department of Defence announced that six F/A-18As (A21-22, -23, -29, -32, -40 and -43) and two F/A-18Bs (A21-101 and -103) would be preserved in Australia. Two of these aircraft were earmarked for static preservation at the Australian War Memorial. All eight Hornets were prepared for museum display by Boeing Defence Australia over a two-year period ending in May 2023.
