= Dassault Mirage III Australian procurement =

Purchase of Mirages by the RAAF from France

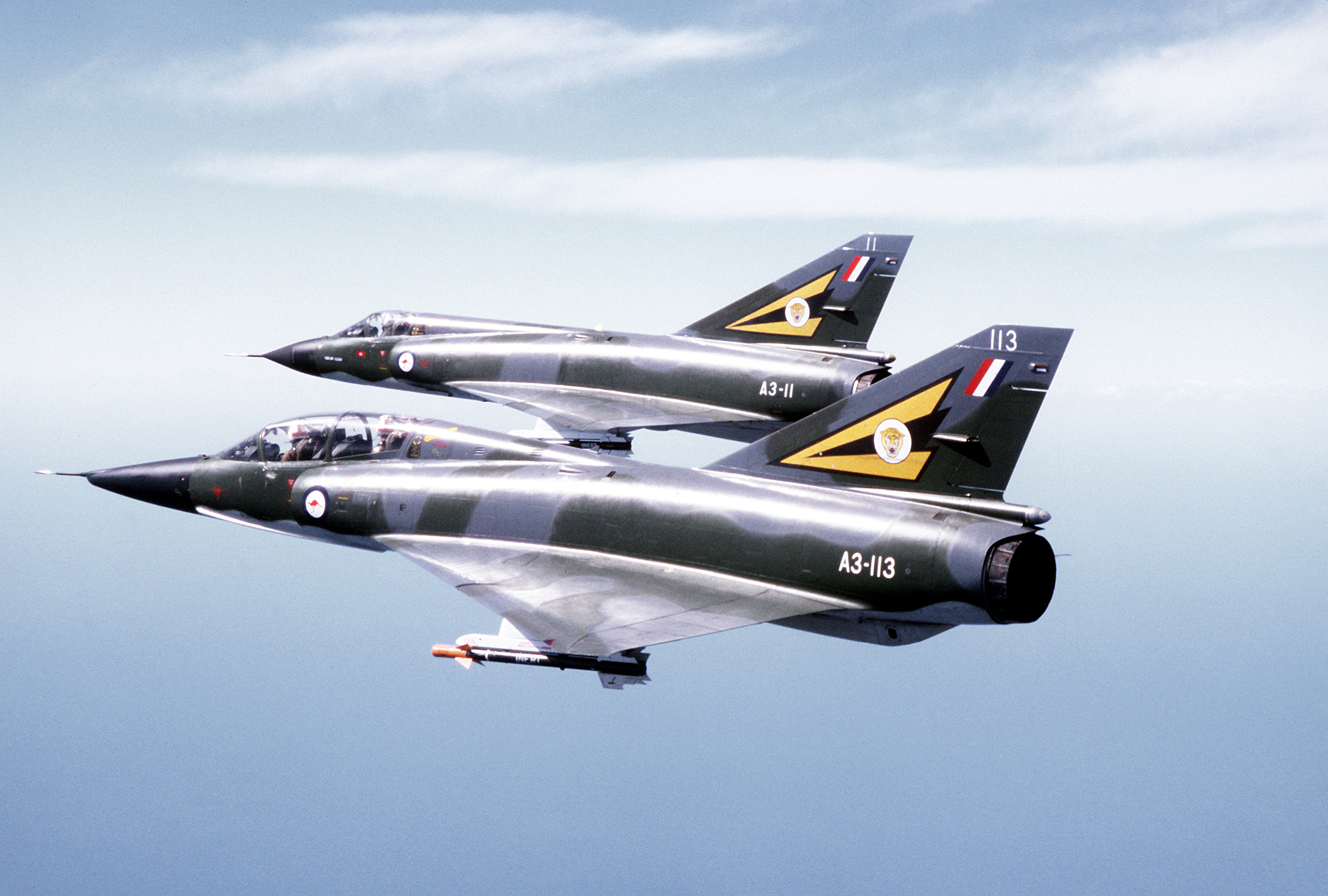
A Mirage IIID (foreground) and Mirage IIIO aircraft of No. 2 Operational Conversion Unit RAAF in flight during a combined US-Australian Air Force exercise, Pacific Consort 1980.

Dassault Mirage III Australian procurement was a transaction between the French and Australian governments which led to the procurement of the French designed delta wing jet aircraft, the Mirage III, for the Royal Australian Air Force (RAAF). In the late 1950s the Australian government announced its intention to modernize its air force with state of the art technology. The French manufacturing company Dassault won the bid over the American Lockheed when the Australian government agreed to buy over 100 Mirages at an estimated cost of AUS$193.7 million in the early 1960s.

The deal made Australia the second export customer for the Mirage III after Israel.

== History ==
The first Mirage III flew in 1956 after a period of development by Générale Aéronautique Marcel Dassault (GAMD) leading to a significant rise in French defence exports in the next two decades, placing France as the world’s third largest defence supplier by 1971. As one of the largest deals contributing to France’s export success, the deal with Australia had a significant impact on French foreign policy, increasing the country’s influence as it succeeded to compete with the two global powers of the Cold War. The deal was equally significant for Australia which, during the 1950s, had not yet decided on an aircraft to replace the outdated CAC-27 Avon Sabre.

On 4 April 1957 the Australian Prime Minister Robert Menzies said in his defence statement:

"Our present planning and preparations are proceeding on the basis of an operational contribution to allied strategy of highly trained men armed with the most modern conventional weapons and equipment."

On 15 December 1960, the Australian Minister of Defence announced the first order for 30 Mirage III "Os", at a cost of 18 million Australian pounds, soon followed by additional orders for 30, then 40 single-seaters and 10 two-seaters (Mirage IIID). The signed agreements also included the manufacture of the aircraft in Australia, with Dassault supplying the components for the airframe and SNECMA the engines. The latter, as well as the canopy and rudder were to be assembled by the Commonwealth Aircraft Corporation, while the Government Aircraft Factories in Melbourne were to take care of the fuselage and final assembly. It was agreed that the first two aeroplanes would be built in France, that six others would be sent dismantled (fuselage, wings, engine) and that two others, finally, would arrive in Australia as unassembled parts.

On 9 April 1963, Group Captain Susans took delivery of the first aircraft at Melun Villaroche Aerodrome. This aircraft was then dismantled and transported aboard a Lockheed C-130 Hercules cargo plane on 1 November 1963. On arrival it was reassembled and flown on 11 January 1964. It was taken on strength by the RAAF on 19 January 1964. On 10 November 1966, the first of ten two-seater versions was accepted.

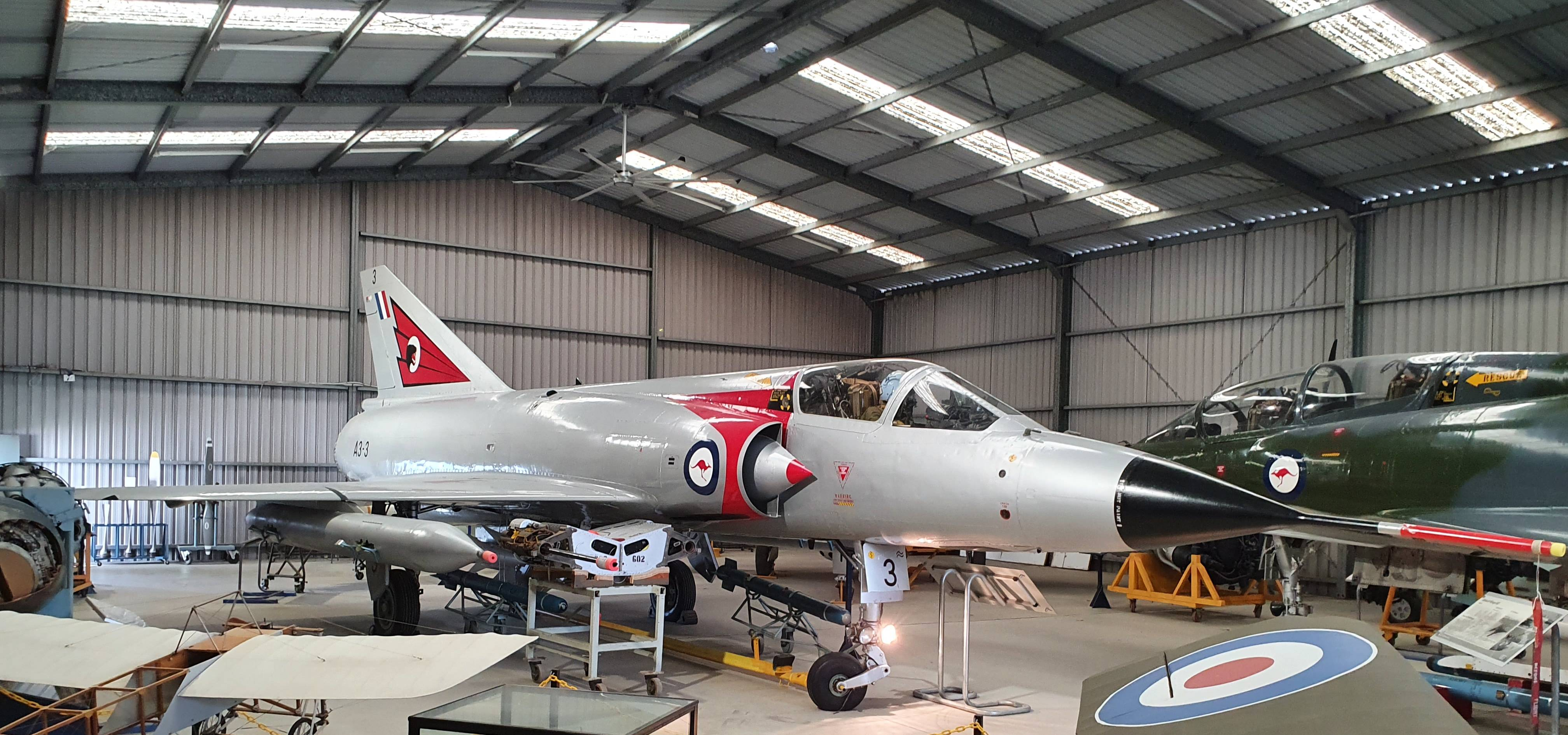
RAAF Mirage A3-3 was the first Mirage built under licence in Australia.

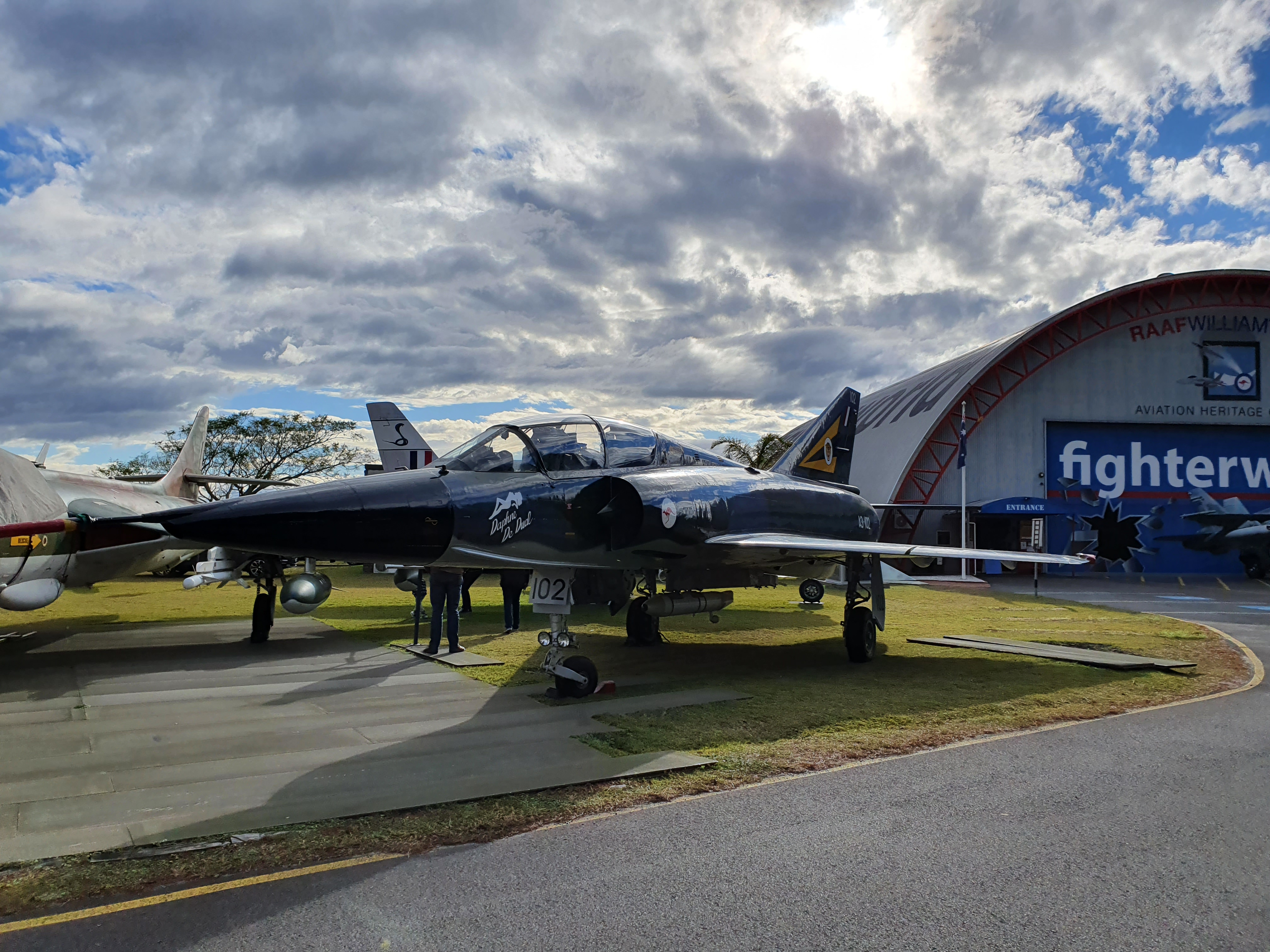
RAAF Mirage IIID A3-102, affectionately known as "Daphne De Dual" is now retired and shown parked at the entrance to Fighter World aviation heritage centre in June 2021.

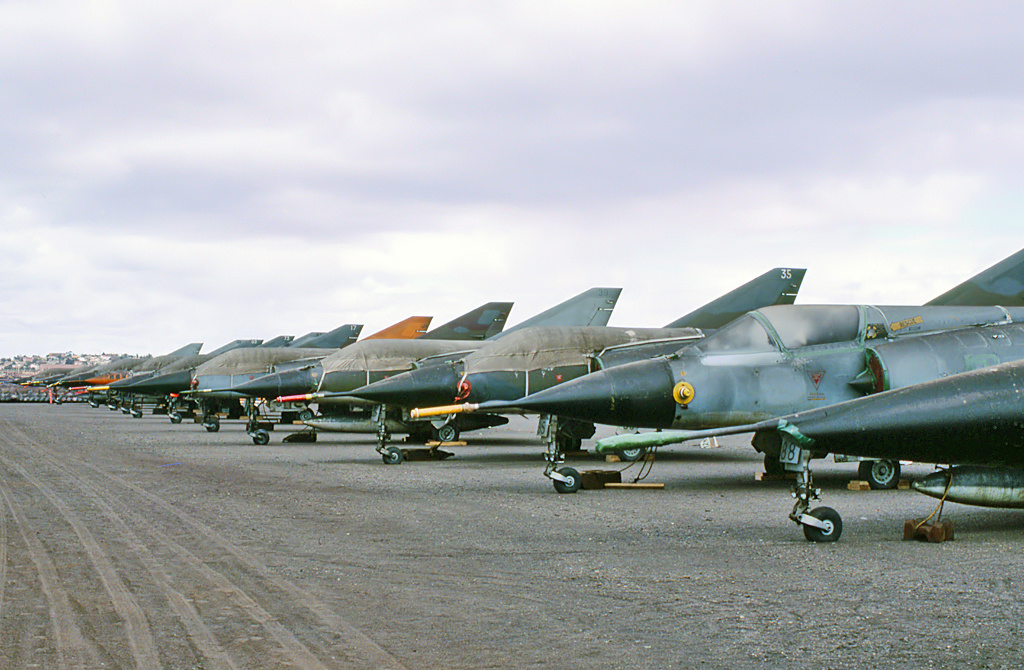
RAAF Dassault Mirage III awaiting delivery to Pakistan at the Whyalla Docks, 21 October 1990

Their American allies in the Vietnam War lent on the Australians heavily to choose the Lockheed F-104G Starfighter making the choice of the French aircraft highly unexpected, especially since the French government was opposed to the war. Mirages entered service in the RAAF in 1965 and were used in a front-line role by seven RAAF units. The first 50 were built under the classification of Mirage IIIO(F) to serve in the interceptor role. The rest were designated IIIO(A) and equipped to serve in the ground attack role. The main additions of this modification were a coat of camouflage paint and the installation of the Cyrano IIB Doppler radar and altimeters. When the last 6 were ordered in 1971 the Australian Government asked for two seated versions for training purposes built between 1973 and 1974. The specification was enabled by the removal of the Cyrano radar to make room for a second cockpit behind the original and the transfer of the avionics system to the nose. This purchase cost A$11 million and allowed the final decommission of the old Sabre trainers.

By June 1969 all of the original Mirage IIIO(F) aircraft were modified to ground attack specifications.

A total of 116 Mirage IIIs were built for Australia. From the mid-1980s, they were used for the advanced training of future 77 Squadron pilots before their conversion to F/A-18 Hornet.

For armament French Matra R.530 missiles were initially purchased and in the 1980s, the R.550 Magic was added.

The Mirage III's RAAF service ended on 30 September 1988. This long service record was in part due to the fact that it exceeded its nominal lifespan estimated at 1,500 flight hours. Several Australian Mirages flew well over 4,000 flight hours. The RAAF was in fact planning the withdrawal of the Mirage III fleet in 1979, especially after having been used more than expected. However, the aeronautical research laboratories of Fisherman's Bend extended the fleet's life cycle by designing fibre repair patches, which prevented wing cracks from spreading. In the event, the Mirage III served the RAAF almost a decade longer than expected.

The aircraft were stored in 1990 and 50 (43 single-seaters and 7 two-seaters) were sold that same year to Pakistan.

Mirage A3-3 was the first Mirage aircraft built under licence in Australia and was delivered to the RAAF on 20 December 1963. Initially serving with ARDU, it subsequently served with 2OCU, 76 SQN and 77 SQN at RAAF Base Williamtown. After it was retired on 31 March 1987, the aircraft was moved to the Fighter World aviation heritage centre where it is on permanent display with dual-seat Mirage III/D A3-102, also known as "Daphne De Dual".

== Preliminary dealings ==
=== Australian team ===
The RAAF sent Wing Commander L.S. Compton and Flying Officer G.W. Talbot to Europe and the United States in 1959 before the official agreement to the deal to make an assessment of 5 aircraft, the Republic F-105, English Electric Lightning, Northrop N-156, Lockheed F-104G and the Dassault Mirage III. The American Lockheed and the French Mirage were picked out as potential replacements for the Avon Sabre and the RAAF personnel recommended the Mirage as the Lockheed did not meet their requirements.

While the two were in France to work with Dassault and the French Air Force on the potential logistics of transferring the Mirage to the RAAF should the deal take place, Talbot flew the Mirage IIIA-01 four times testing Mach 2 at 35,000 feet, weight and range performance, and low speed handling. A team of technicians was sent after them in 1963 to work on further details. The team spent a 6 month intensive course to learn French and were instructed on the aircraft and its capabilities by the French Air force and Dassault, in order to become experts on the designs so that the RAAF could tailor the model’s specifications even further.

=== Translation of the plans ===
Problems arose in the translation of technical jargon, particularly in regards to the new electronics that were built into the Mirage such as three dimensional trigonometry based resolvers, transistors and printed circuit boards. This made it difficult for the technical team to construct accurate English blueprints. Differences in French technical drawings and the use of the metric system, which had not yet been adopted in Australia, also increased the time and cost of the production of designs that were usable by Australian tradesmen.

== Embargo controversy ==
In 1967 a policy shift in the French Government concerning the Middle East led to fifty Mirages, paid for by the Israeli government, being retained and a period of tension occurred between Australia and France. As a result Israel looked to Australia for Mirage aircraft and parts manufacturing. In response, the French government put caveats on the further sale of Mirage parts and ammunition to Australia, leading to a misunderstanding that the French were placing a military related embargo on Australia because of the disagreement the two countries had about the Vietnam War.

This was not unfounded, as Sweden and Switzerland had already restricted the Australian use of their technology in the war, so when a rumour spread that France had instructions that no RAAF Mirages be sent to Vietnam, threatening a cessation of ammunition provision, the idea of an embargo was made more believable by the circumstances.

In 1979, several years after the cessation of Australian involvement in Vietnam (and after the end of the war itself), plans to modify the Mirages to use spare British Aden cannon ammunition started a dispute concerning royalty payments for Australian production under licence of French Direction des Études et Fabrications d'Armement (DEFA) ammunition and parts, and served to revive rumours of a broader rift between the Australian and French governments. However, the Australian government denied such rumours – citing the fact that a RAAF team was working with Dassault to assess the possibility of cooperation on development of the Mirage 2000.

== Modifications and Australian involvement ==
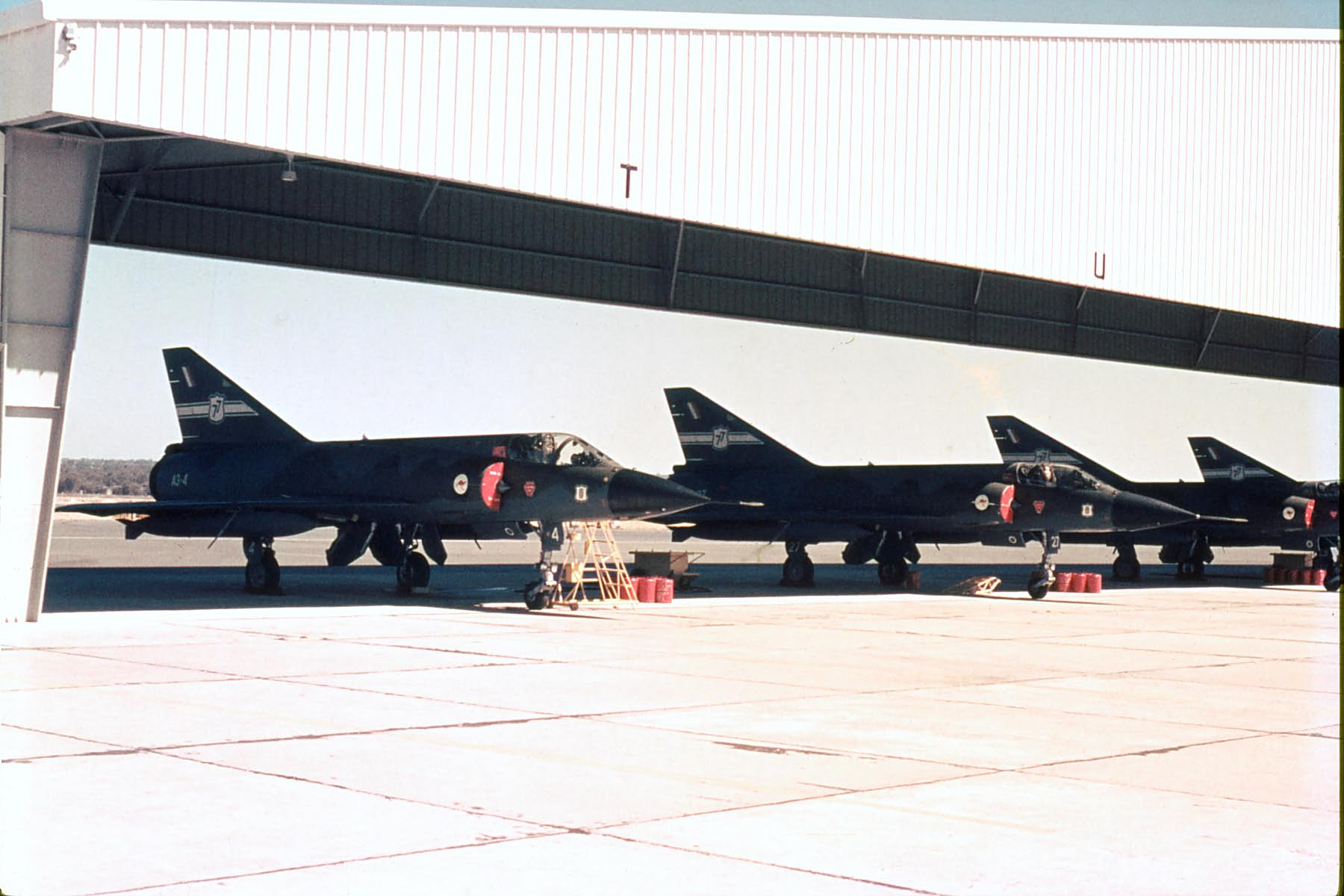
Mirage IIIO, No. 77 Squadron RAAF, RAAF Base Pearce, 1972.

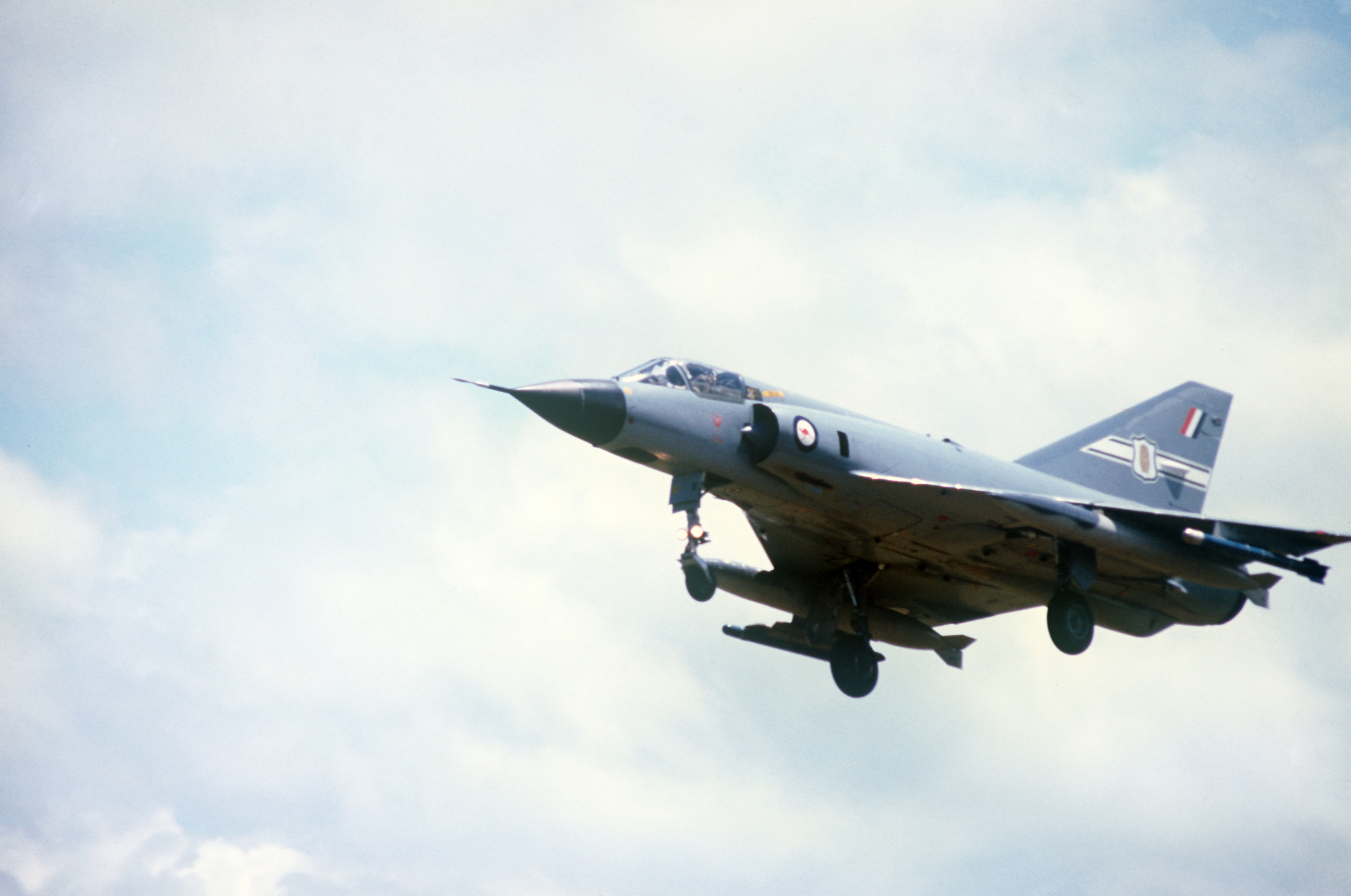
A Mirage IIIO in 1985

The Mirage III was chosen over the Lockheed F-104G primarily for reasons of the American fighters being unsuitable for RAAF purposes in areas of aircraft handling, engine reliability, ferry range as well as being too expensive, too few and requiring higher quality airfields not yet constructed by Australia. The Mirage, whilst not perfectly fitting for RAAF requirements itself, could be customized and was already ready to serve as a multi purpose aircraft. It was arranged that Dassault would work with the Australian air force to modify the Mirage in various ways based on the initial report from the Australian team upon assessing costs, engineering, maintenance, licence production and delivery schedule.

The Commonwealth Aircraft Corporation (CAC) in Australia was still running its production facilities from when it was tasked with the creation of the previous Sabre aircraft and was brought into the project along with the Melbourne based Government Aircraft Factories (GAF) which had served as the Department of Aircraft Production for the Australian Government during World War II. These companies would help with the manufacturing side of the customisation process of the Mirage III as an Australian contribution and were tasked with cooperating with Dassault, receiving production drawings, technical data, aircraft parts, materials and equipment from GAMID. The CAC was prepared for this manner of interaction due to its history of participating with joint aircraft projects with US and UK designs. According to the two senior Australian engineers on the project Ted Bennet and Pierce Talbot, "the opportunity to become involved in the production of a supersonic fighter was received with great enthusiasm."

Specific parts were carefully chosen to be entirely manufactured in Australia in a strategic manner to save on costs judging by the competitive market at the time. Many of these were selected with a long term vision in mind, being the more disposable and consumable materials that would otherwise need to be purchased continually throughout the service lifetime of the aircraft. This decision was made because a trend was identified in the earlier use of aircraft by the RAAF, in which most were kept in service by spending on maintenance as long as possible rather than investing in new aircraft. This would allow Australia to manufacture replacements of those necessary parts which would wear out the fastest even after no more Mirages were produced by Dassault. The most important customization choices made by the RAAF were the powerplant, avionics and weapons. The British Rolls-Royce Avon engine, having been proved effective serving in both the Sabre and Canberra, was preferred and a Mirage IIIA with a RB146 Avon 67 turbojet engine was created and tested in February 1961. However, due to issues of expense the French Safran Aircraft Engines (SNECMA) ATAR 9C advertised in the original designs was used thereafter. The first RAAF model created, the A3-1, was handed over to Australia in 1963 and the second, the A3-2, was kept in France. These served as experimental prototypes, testing the modifications as they were implemented. Two completed aircraft packages were sent to GAF for assembly and saw the first Australian flight test in November 1963 in the A3-3 by Squadron leader Bill Collings at Avalon. The A3-16 was the first to include the chosen parts provided by the Australian manufacturers as they took over from Dassault. 60 of these aircraft were ordered by the RAAF not including 10 double seated aircraft for pilot training.
