= Dassault Mirage F1 =

French attack aircraft

Mirage F1
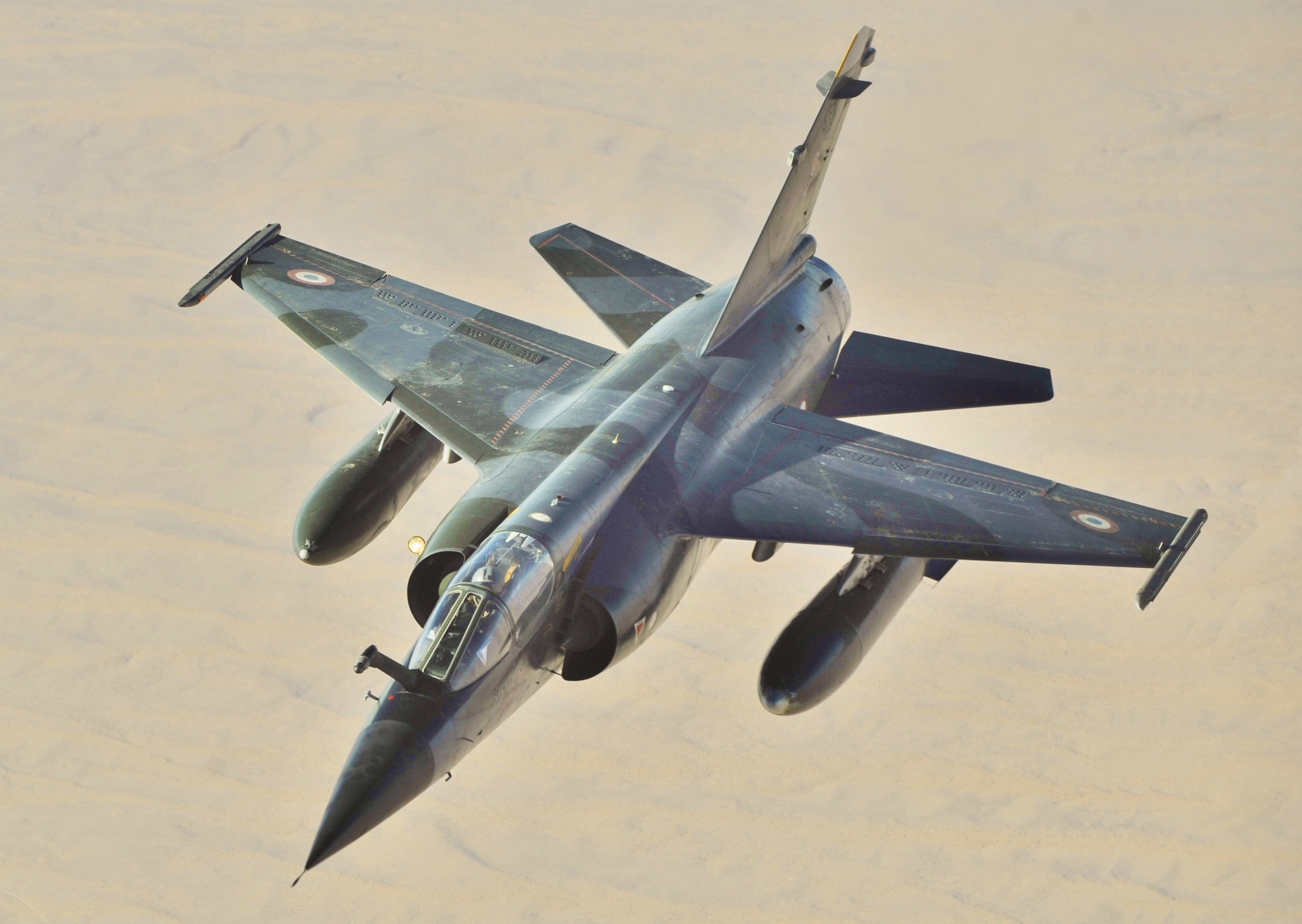
- A French Air Force Mirage F1.

General information
- Type: Fighter aircraft
- National origin: France
- Manufacturer: Dassault Aviation
- Status: In limited service
- Primary users: French Air Force (historical) Iraqi Air Force (historical); Hellenic Air Force (historical); Spanish Air Force (historical)
- Number built: 726

History
- Manufactured: 1966–1992
- Introduction date: 1973; 53 years ago
- First flight: 23 December 1966; 59 years ago
- Developed from: Dassault Mirage III

The Dassault Mirage F1 is a French fighter and attack aircraft designed and manufactured by Dassault Aviation. It was developed as a successor to the Mirage III family.

During the 1960s, Dassault commenced development of what would become the Mirage F1 as a private venture, alongside the larger Mirage F2. Work on the F1 eventually took precedence over the costlier F2, which was cancelled during the late 1960s. The French Air Force (Armée de l'Air) took interest in the fledgling fighter to meet its requirement for an all-weather interceptor aircraft. Accordingly, initial production units were equipped with the Thomson-CSF Cyrano IV monopulse radar. During the latter half of 1974, the Mirage F1 entered service in the French Air Force. Shortly thereafter, the type was deployed as the main interceptor of the French Air Force, a capacity which it continued to serve in until the arrival of the Mirage 2000. It later transitioned to an aerial reconnaissance role. In July 2014, the last French Mirage F1s were retired from service.

Powered by a single SNECMA Atar 9K-50 turbojet engine, which provided about 7 tonnes-force (69 kN; 15,000 lbf) of thrust, and armed with an array of French and American-sourced armaments, the Mirage F1 has been operated as a light multipurpose fighter and has been exported to around a dozen nations. The type has seen action in a large number of armed conflicts involving several of its operators, including the Western Sahara War, the Paquisha War, the Cenepa War, the Iran–Iraq War, the Gulf War, the South African Border War, the War in Afghanistan, the Chadian–Libyan conflict, the 2011 military intervention in Libya, and the Northern Mali conflict. Although sources differ, and no official record exists, somewhere in the region of 726 Mirage F1s of all variants and trainers were manufactured during its run between 1966 and 1992. It was succeeded in production by the Dassault Mirage 2000.

== Development ==
The Mirage F1 emerged from a series of design studies performed by French aircraft manufacturer Dassault Aviation. Having originally sought to develop a larger swept wing derivative of the Mirage III, which became the Mirage F2, to serve as a vertical take-off and landing (VTOL) propulsion testbed akin to the Dassault Mirage IIIV, however, it was soon recognized that the emerging design could function as the basis for a competent fighter as well. Both the Mirage F2 and a smaller derivative, referred to the Mirage F3, received substantial attention from both Dassault and the French Air Force, the latter being interested in its adoption as a long-range fighter bomber as a stopgap measure prior to the adoption of the envisioned Anglo-French Variable Geometry (AFVG) strike aircraft.

Parallel with the Mirage F3 study, which was intended to serve as an interceptor aircraft, Dassault decided to study a single-seat derivative which featured the all-French SNECMA Atar 9K-50 turbojet engine. As a result of the cancellation of two major projects, the company's design team found themselves with a decreased workload. Accordingly, in mid-1964, Dassault decided to commence design work on the smaller aircraft, subsequently designated as the Mirage F1, with the intention of producing a successor to its Mirage III and Mirage 5 fighters; This work was performed under a government contract in anticipation of a potential French Air Force specification for an all-weather interceptor to succeed its fleet of Mirage IIIC aircraft.

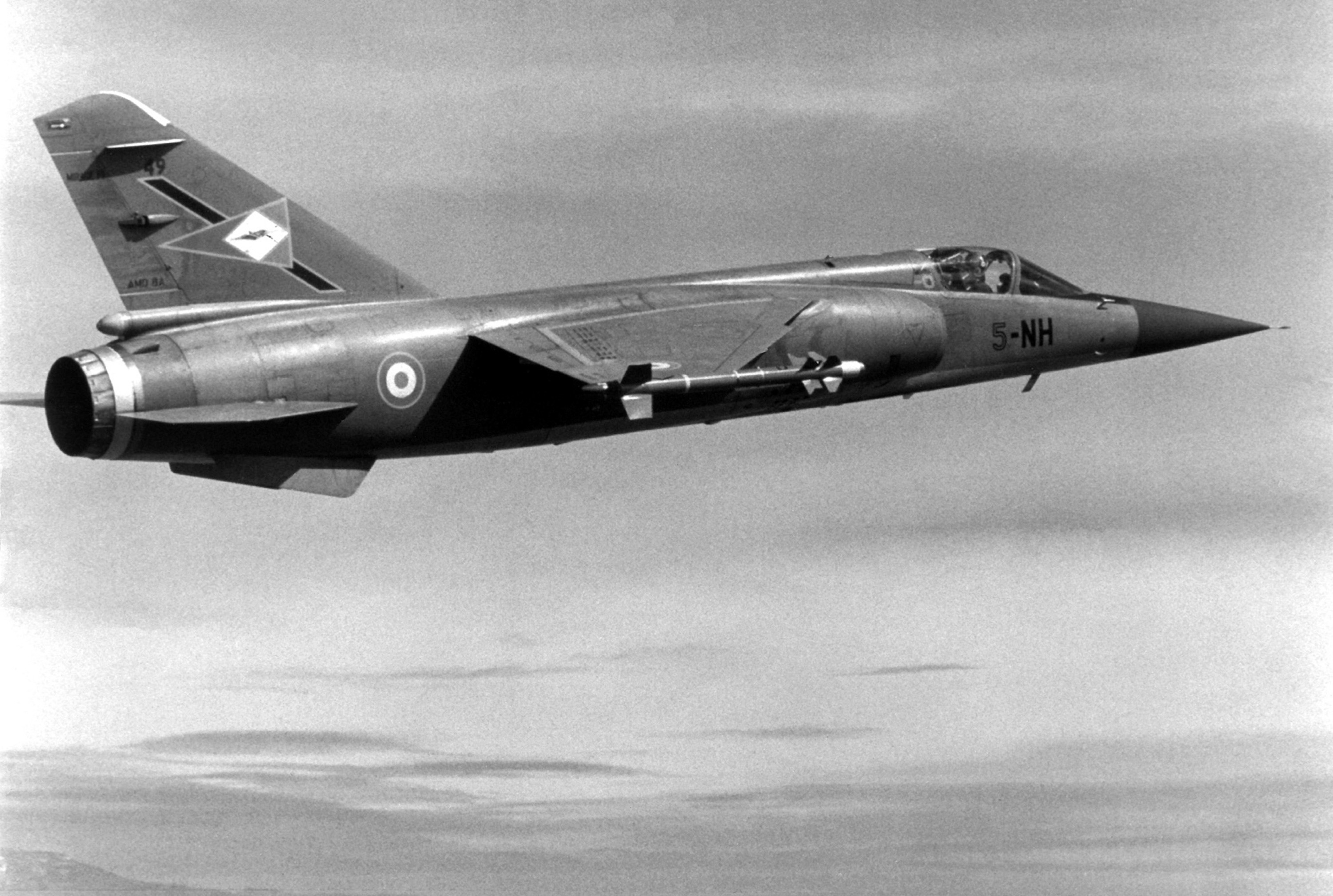
Mirage F1 Escadron de chasse 1/5 Vendée.

The Mirage F1 was of similar size to the delta-winged Mirage III and Mirage 5, and was powered by the same SNECMA Atar engine as had been used on the larger Dassault Mirage IV; however, unlike its predecessors, it shared the layout of a swept wing mounted high on the fuselage and a conventional tail surface as used by the F2. Although it has a smaller wingspan than the Mirage III, the Mirage F1 nevertheless proved to be superior to its predecessor, carrying more fuel while possessing a shorter take-off run and superior maneuverability.

On 23 December 1966, the first prototype conducted its maiden flight. The first flight had been delayed due to a funding shortage affecting the overall program. During its fourth flight, the prototype was recorded as having attained a top speed in excess of Mach 2. On 18 May 1967, the first prototype was lost in an accident at DGA Essais en vol, Istres; the crash had resulted from a loss of control after encountering flutter, killing its pilot. Despite this misfortune, during late 1966, the Mirage F1 programme was officially adopted by the French Air Force. Following a redesign period, on 20 March 1967, the second prototype performed its first flight.

On 26 May 1967, an order for three Mirage F1 prototypes was placed, while the larger and more expensive Mirage F2 was formally abandoned. These three pre-service aircraft, along with a static structural test airframe, soon joined the test programme. By late 1971, the construction of an initial batch of 85 production standard Mirage F1 had been authorised.

In order to comply with the French Air Force's requirement for an all-weather interceptor, the first production Mirage F1C was equipped with a Thomson-CSF Cyrano IV radar system. The later Cyrano IV-1 version added a limited look-down capability. However, Mirage F1 pilots reported that the radar was prone to overheating, which reduced its efficiency. During May 1973, the first deliveries to the French Air Force took place; the type entered squadron service with EC 2/30 Normandie-Niemen in December of that year.

By October 1971, the Mirage F1 was under production at both Dassault's Bordeaux facility and at SABCA's own plant in Belgium, work at the latter having been performed under an industrial arrangement associated to Belgium's order for 106 Mirage 5 aircraft. The 79 aircraft of the next production run were delivered during the period March 1977 to December 1983. These were of the Mirage F1C-200 version, which featured a fixed refuelling probe, which required an extension of the fuselage by 7 cm (2.75 in).

== Design ==
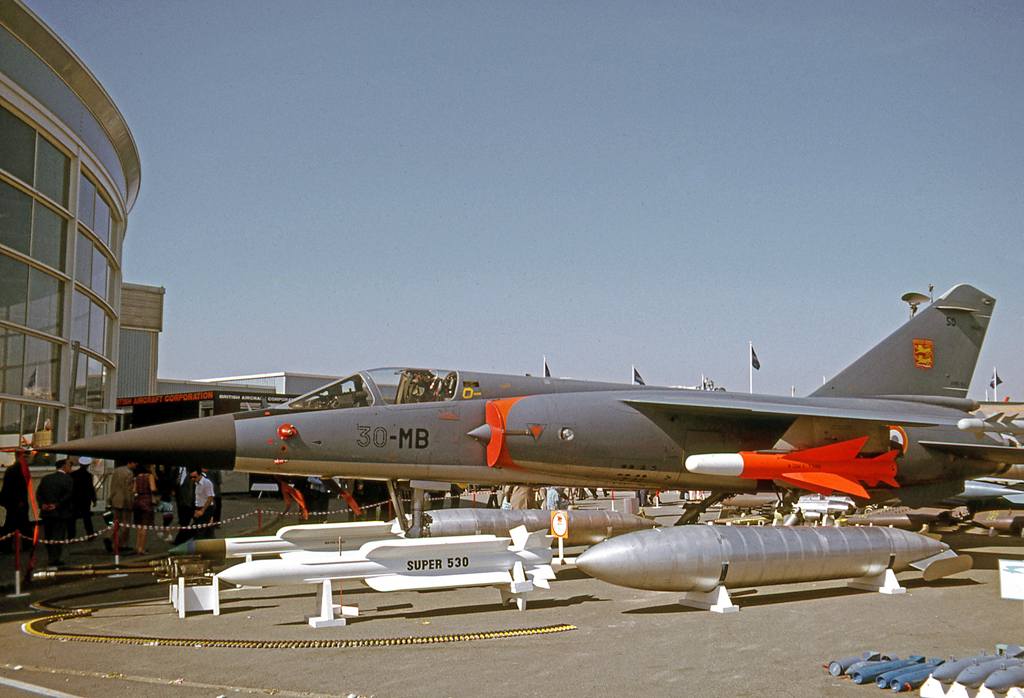
Mirage F1C of EC 2/30 Normandie-Niemen at the 1975 Paris Air Show.

The Dassault Mirage F1 was a single-engine fighter aircraft, designed to function as both an interceptor aircraft and a ground attack platform. While officially developed for the French Air Force as an air defense aircraft, Dassault had placed considerable emphasis on developing the Mirage F1 for ground attack duties as a secondary role during its early design. Developed by the company to function as a successor to the successful Mirage III and Mirage 5 families, it drew heavily upon its predecessors as well, sharing the same fuselage as the Mirage III, while adopting a considerably different wing configuration.

The Mirage F1 used a shoulder-mounted swept wing, instead of the Delta wing of the Mirage III, which resulted in a more than 50% reduction in required runway lengths and increased internal fuel tankage for 40% greater combat range. The approach speed prior to landing is 25% less than the preceding Mirage IIIE. According to Dassault, the negative performance impact associated with the increased thickness of the Mirage F1's wing over the Mirage III's counterpart had been offset by improvements made to the propulsion system. The wing is fitted with both double-slotted trailing edge flaps and full-span leading edge slats, the latter being automatically operated to reduce the aircraft's turn radius during combat.

A key area of advancement on the Mirage F1 over its predecessors was in its onboard avionics. The Thomson-CSF Cyrano IV monopulse radar system, developed from the Cyrano II unit installed on the Mirage IIIE, serves as the main sensor; it operates in three different modes: air-target acquisition and tracking, ground mapping, and terrain avoidance. The later Cyrano IV-1 model also provided for a limited look-down capability. According to aerospace publication Flight International, the Cyrano IV radar was capable of detecting aerial targets at double the range of earlier models. The standard production Mirage F1 was furnished with an Instrument Landing System (ILS), radar altimeter, UHF/VHF radio sets, Tactical Air Navigation system (TACAN) and a ground data link. Other avionics include an autopilot and yaw damper.

The Mirage F1 was powered by a single SNECMA Atar 9K-50 turbojet engine, which was capable of providing roughly 7 tonnes-force (69 kN; 15,000 lbf) of thrust, giving the aircraft a maximum speed of 1,453 MPH and an altitude ceiling of 65,615 feet. Flight International described the Atar engine as being "unexpectedly simple", despite the adoption of an afterburner. An improved engine, initially known as the Super Atar and later as the Snecma M53, was intended to be eventually adopted on production Mirage F1 aircraft, as well as for successor aircraft.

The initial armament of the Mirage F1 was a pair of internal 30 mm cannons, and a single Matra R530 medium-range air-to-air missile, which was carried under the fuselage. It could carry a total combined payload of 6300 kg of bombs and missiles, all of which would be carried externally. After 1979, the medium-range R530 was replaced by the improved Matra Super 530 F missile as the latter came into service in quantity with the French Air Force. In 1977, the R550 Magic was released, which the Mirage F1 mounted on wingtip rails. Around the same time, the American AIM-9 Sidewinder was also introduced to the Mirage F1's armament; both the Spanish and Hellenic Air Forces had requested the integration of the Sidewinder upon their own Mirage F1CE and Mirage F1CG fighters.

== Operational history ==
=== France ===
During 1984, the first operational deployment to be performed by French Air Force Mirage F1s was conducted during Operation Manta, the French intervention in Chad to counteract the growing Libyan encroachment in the region. A force of four Mirage F1C-200s provided air cover for a further group of four Jaguar strike aircraft; they also participated in a number of skirmishes against pro-Libyan Transitional Government of National Unity (GUNT) rebels.

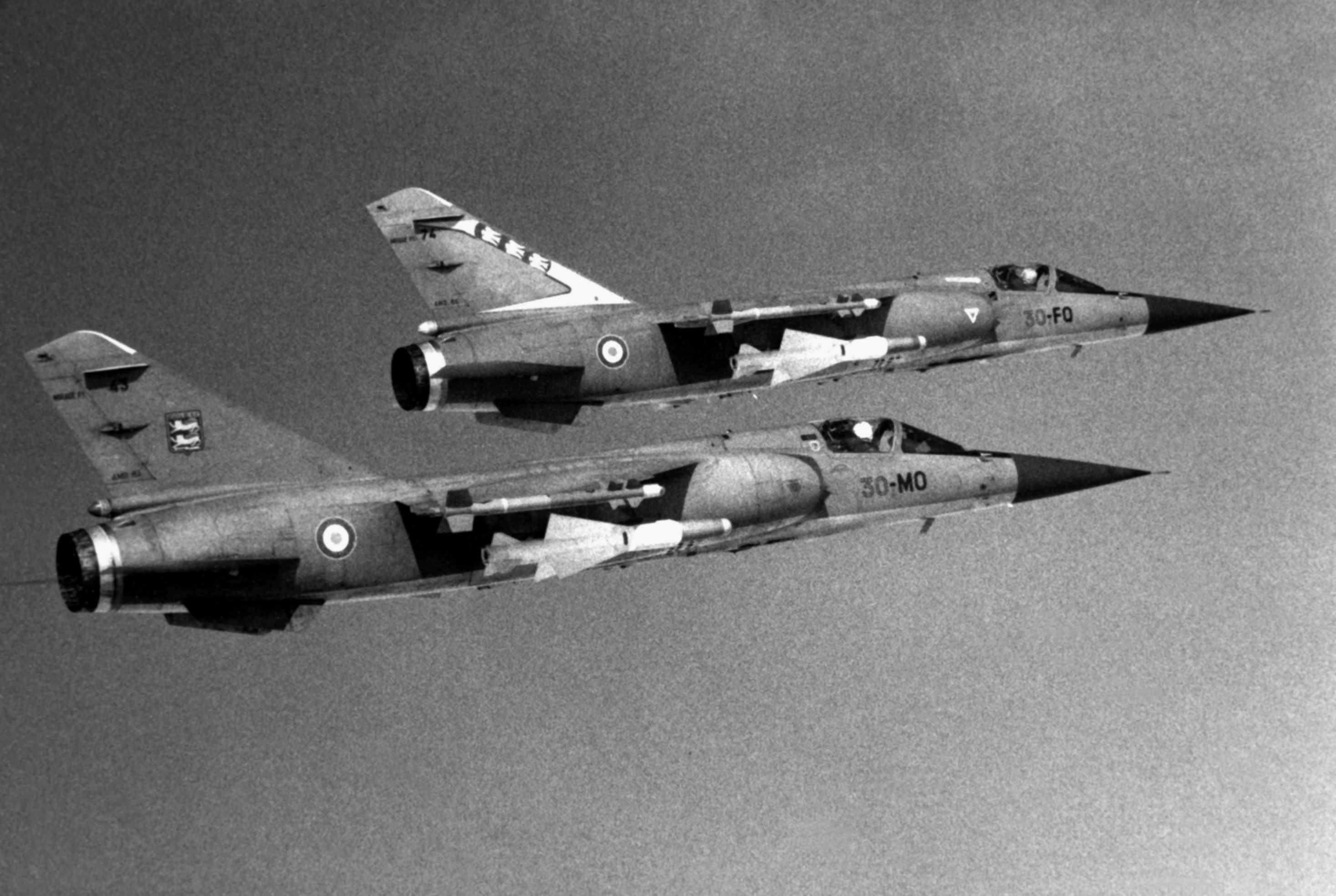
A pair of French Air Force Mirage F1Cs from the EC 2/30 and EC 3/30 in flight, 31 May 1986.

In 1986, French Mirage F1s were redeployed to Chad as part of Operation Epervier. A flight of four F1C-200s provided fighter cover for a strike package of eight Jaguars during the air raid against the Libyan airbase at Ouadi Doum, on 16 February. A pair of F1CRs also conducted pre and post-strike reconnaissance missions.

In response to the Iraqi invasion of Kuwait, France performed two deployments of Mirage F1s to the Persian Gulf. In October 1990, 12 Mirage F1Cs were dispatched to Doha, Qatar in order to boost air defences, while a further four Mirage F1CRs of ER 33 were deployed to Saudi Arabia as part of Operation Daguet in September 1990. To avoid the risk of being mistaken for hostile Iraqi Mirage F1s, all of the French F1CRs were grounded during the first few days of the Allied air attacks, flying their first combat mission on 26 January 1991; an additional reason for their initial grounding was the lack of compatible night vision equipment. They were used in the fighter bomber role, using their more capable navigation systems to lead formations of French Jaguar fighter bombers, as well as to fly reconnaissance missions; in this capacity, 114 sorties had been flown by the end of hostilities. Following the end of the Gulf War, France deployed a number of Mirage F1CRs to bases in neighbouring Turkey as part of Operation Provide Comfort to protect Kurds from Iraqi aggression.

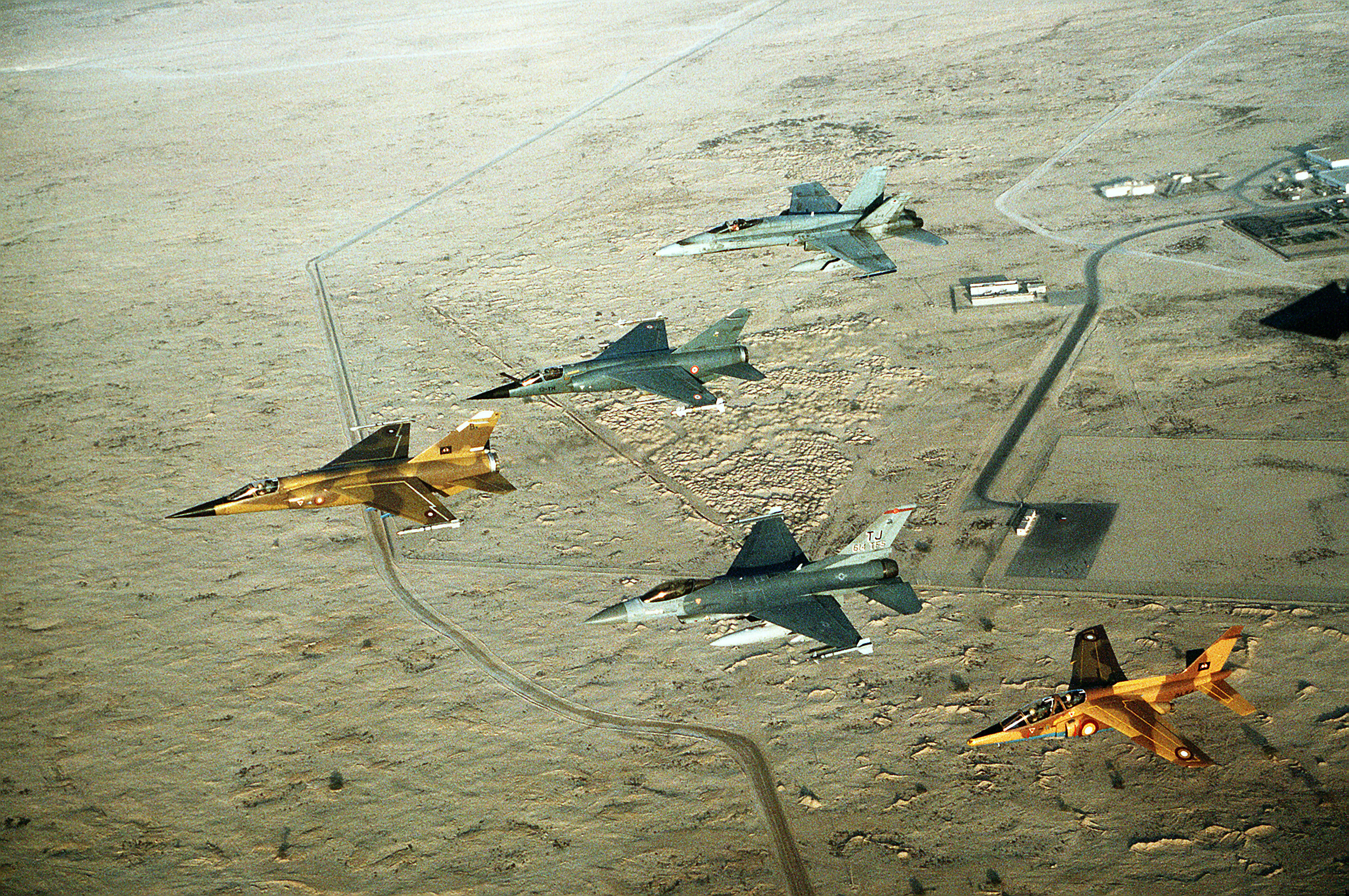
A multinational fighter formation, including, left to right, a Qatari F-1 Mirage, a French F-1C Mirage, a U.S. Air Force F-16C Fighting Falcon, a Canadian CF-18A Hornet and a Qatari Alpha Jet, during Operation Desert Shield.

In October 2007, three Mirage 2000s and three Mirage F1s were deployed at Kandahar Air Force Base, where they flew close air support and tactical reconnaissance missions in support of international forces in Southern Afghanistan.

The last French unit to be equipped with the Mirage F1 was the Escadron de Reconnaissance 2/33 Savoie, home-based at Mont-de-Marsan, which flew the latest version of the F1CR. The unit's primary mission was tactical reconnaissance, with a secondary mission of ground-attack; because of the unique missions of the 2/33, their unofficial motto among the pilots had become, "Find; Identify; and Photograph or Destroy." In accordance with a bilateral defense agreement between France and Chad, a pair of 2/33 F1CRs, along with 3 pilots, a photo interpreter, an intelligence officer and ground crews were always deployed to N'Djamena, Chad. The two 2/33 F1CRs operated with three Mirage 2000Ds, also based on rotation from France to Chad.

During March 2011, 2/33 Mirage F1CRs were deployed to Solenzara Air Base, Corsica and conducted reconnaissance missions over Libya (also a Mirage F1 operator) as part of Opération Harmattan. In 2013 2/33 F1CRs also participated in Operation Serval in Mali. On 10 January, launching from their base in N'Djamena in Chad, the first French air intervention mission against Islamist rebels in Mali, was undertaken by F1CRs and Mirage 2000Ds, supported by a French Air Force C-135 tanker. The 2/33 F1CRs provided valuable photo information for strike aircraft flying the next day from France. Later on 16 January, two 2/33 F1CRs, were deployed from Chad to Bamako, Mali. Both aircraft were fitted with extra long range 2,200 litre (581 US gallons, 484 imp gallons) ventral tanks; and when operating over Mali also carried two 250 kg unguided bombs, plus their internal 30mm cannons, in case they were called on for close air support missions.

In order to replace the elderly F1CRs of ER 2/33, a number of Rafales were outfitted with an advanced reconnaissance pod. The Rafale's range, maneuverability and combat load is far superior to the F1CR that it replaces, as well as its reconnaissance capabilities: after the Rafale's pod has taken photographs, these can be almost instantly transmitted back to its base or where the imagery would be required if provisioned with compatible down link equipment. The French Air Force's last Mirage F1 fighters were retired from operational service on 13 June 2014. The last units in service, these being 11 single-seat Mirage F1CRs and three two-seat F1Bs were transferred to storage; six aircraft performed a final appearance in a flypast during Bastille Day celebrations over Paris prior to their disposal.

=== Ecuador ===
Between 1979 and 1980, Ecuador received 16 F1JAs (a variant of the F1E) and a pair of F1JEs. The Ecuadorian Air Force's (FAE) squadron of Mirage F1JAs (Escuadrón de Caza 2112) went into action in January–February 1981 during the brief Paquisha War between Ecuador and Peru, less than two years after the aircraft had been delivered to the FAE. At that time, the Ecuadorians decided against directly challenging the Peruvian Air Force (abbreviated FAP), whose Mirage 5Ps and Sukhoi Su-22 were providing air cover to Peruvian heliborne operations within the combat zone. Instead, the Mirages were kept at a distance, performing combat air patrols (CAPs) on the fringes of the combat area, in case the border clashes escalated into wider hostilities. During one incident, a Peruvian Sukhoi Su-22 was intercepted and a single air-to-air R.550 missile was launched; however, it failed to strike the Peruvian aircraft.

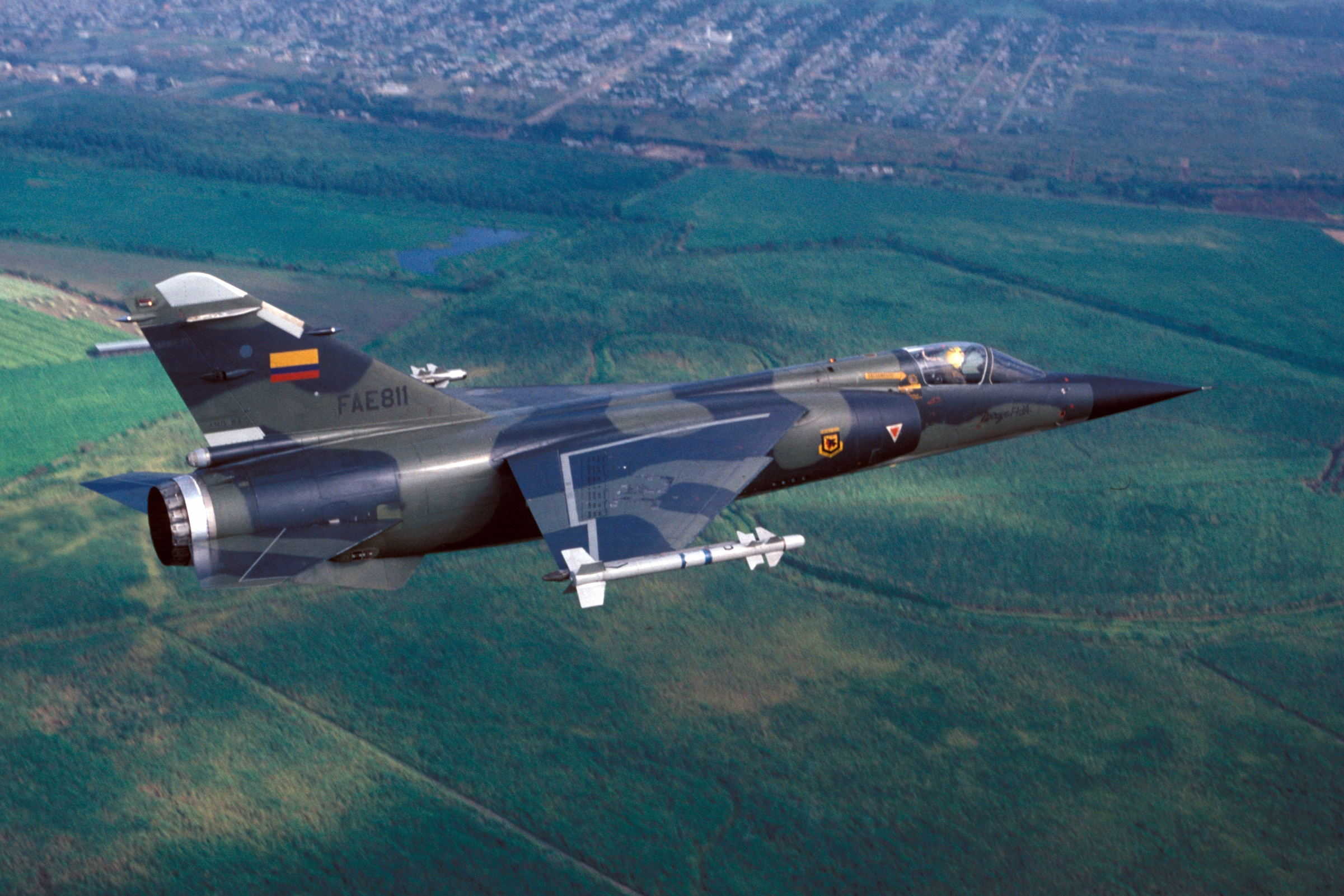
An Ecuadoran Mirage F1JA during the joint US/Ecuadoran exercise "Blue Horizon '86".

In 1995, during the Cenepa War, the Ecuadorian Mirages went back into action against Peru. This time, while the bulk of the squadron was kept back at Taura AFB, a small detachment of Mirage F1s and Kfir C.2s was deployed to undisclosed forward air bases to dissuade Peruvian attack aircraft from entering the combat zone. By this time, the planes had been upgraded with Israeli electronics and Python Mk.III air-to-air missiles, usually mounted on the outer underwing pylons, and Matra R550 Magic AAMs on wing-tip launch rails.

On 10 February 1995, a pair of Mirage F1JAs, piloted by Maj. Raúl Banderas and Capt. Carlos Uzcátegui, were directed over five targets approaching the combat zone in the Cenepa valley. After making visual contact, the Mirages fired their missiles, claiming two Peruvian Su-22Ms shot down, while a Kfir claimed a further A-37B Dragonfly. Sources in Peru, however, deny the claim that the Sukhois Su-22Ms were shot down by Ecuadorian aircraft, stating that one was shot down by Ecuadorian anti-aircraft artillery fire during a low flying ground-attack mission, while the second was lost because of an engine fire. Banderas served as Commander of the Ecuadorian Air Force between May 2014 and February 2016, while Uzcátegui died in a training accident in 2002 at Salinas air base, in the Santa Elena Province.

In 2011, all of the remaining Ecuadorian Mirage F1s still in service were retired after having flown more than 33,000 flight hours during their 32 years in active service; they were replaced by a squadron of Atlas Cheetah fighters bought from South Africa.

=== Greece ===
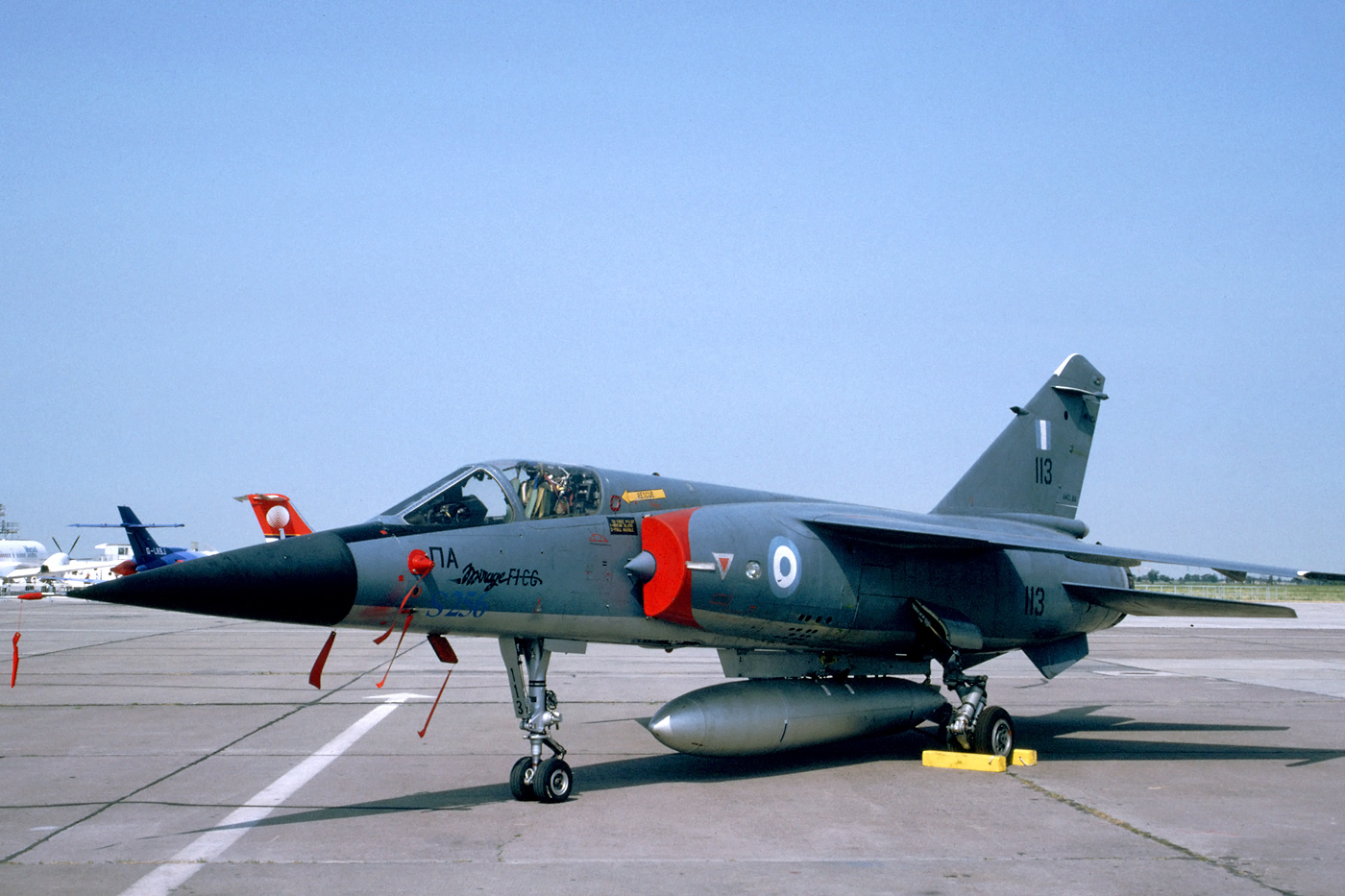
A Mirage F1CG in 1992

Greece operated 40 Dassault Mirage F1CG single-seat fighters. The F1CG was first ordered in 1974 and entered service with the Hellenic Air Force in 1975. The aircraft were used by the 334th All-Weather Squadron and the 342nd All-Weather Squadron. Mirage F1CGs were armed with the AIM-9P missile, rather than the more commonly used R.550 Magic, and could carry four AIM-9Ps, rather than just two.

The Hellenic Air Force retired the remaining 27 Mirage F1CGs on 30 June 2003 after 28 years of service and 160,000 flying hours. A number of F1CG aircraft have been preserved, permanently grounded, for display. At least four are preserved in Tanagra Air Base (LGTG) (115, 124, 129 and 140). One more (134) is preserved at the HAF History Department, Delta Falirou.

==== Greco-Turkish Aegean Standoff ====
Mirage F1s were used in mock dogfights with the Turkish Air Force over disputed waters and airspace in the Aegean Sea during 1987, and on 18 June 1992, a Greek Mirage F1 crashed while attempting to intercept two Turkish F-16s, another is claimed to have crashed in similar circumstances on 4 September 1995, and on 8 February 1995, a Turkish F-16 crashed after dogfighting Greek F1s. The loss of a Turkish RF-4E (69-7485) on the 20 October 1995 is conformed and often attributed to a dogfight with the Mirage F1. A further claim—that is denied—is the loss of a Mirage on the 7th of November 1994 to a Turkish F-16. The loss of a further RF-4E on 5 November 1997 is recorded and may have been the victim of either an F-16 or a Mirage F1.

=== Iraq ===
Starting in 1977 and continuing through the 1980s, Iraq placed several orders for Mirage F1s. Although the first version, designated as the Mirage F1EQ, was quite similar to the original French Mirage F1C, those developed subsequently were increasingly modified with custom-tailored equipment (notably in the field of electronic warfare), according to the Iraqis' wishes. During this period, France was a major supplier of military equipment to the nation; in 1983, the former loaned five Super Étendards to Iraq while the latter was awaiting the delivery of the Exocet-capable Mirage F1EQ-5, which would not be available until September 1984. The Super Étendard had been strongly advocated for by Dassault, who had feared the potential cancellation of the sizable Mirage F1 order by Iraq if the request was not granted.

From 1983 onwards, Iraqi Mirage F1s were also used for ground attack. In this role, the Mirage F1 was used to replace Iraq's aging fleet of Hawker Hunters. In September 1985, an agreement was signed between Dassault and Iraq for the delivery of a further 24 aircraft, consisting of 18 Mirage F1EQ-6 fighters and 6 F1BQ trainers.

During the Iran–Iraq War, Iraq's Mirage F1EQs were used intensively for interception, ground attack and anti-shipping missions. The Mirage F1EQ allowed for Iraqi strikes to be conducted over a greater combat radius into Iran than had been previously possible. In November 1981, an Iraqi Mirage F1 accounted for the first Iranian F-14 Tomcat to be shot down, followed by several more in the following months, giving the previously timid Iraqi Air Force new confidence in air-to-air combat engagements with the Iranians. According to research by journalist Tom Cooper, during the war 33 Iraqi Mirage F1s were shot down by Iranian F-14s and two were downed by Iranian F-4 Phantom II units. Iraqi F1EQs claimed at least 35 Iranian aircraft, mostly F-4s and Northrop F-5E Tiger IIs, but also several F-14 Tomcats.

On 14 September 1983, a pair of Turkish Air Force F-100F Super Sabre fighter jets of 182 Filo “Atmaca” penetrated Iraqi airspace. A Mirage F1EQ of the Iraqi Air Force intercepted the flight and fired a Super 530F-1 missile at them. One of the Turkish fighter jets (s/n 56-3903) was shot down and crashed in Zakho valley near the Turkish-Iraqi border. The plane's pilots reportedly survived the crash and were returned to Turkey. The incident was not made public by either side, although some details surfaced in later years. The incident was revealed in 2012 by Turkish Defence Minister İsmet Yılmaz, in response to a parliamentary question by Republican People's Party (CHP) MP Metin Lütfi Baydar in the aftermath of the downing of a Turkish F-4 Phantom II in Syria, in 2012.

On 17 May 1987, an Iraqi Falcon 50 modified with elements of a Mirage F1 fired a pair of Exocet missiles at the United States Navy (USN) warship USS Stark as it patrolled the Persian Gulf, causing extensive damage to the ship, killing 37 and wounding 21 members of Stark's crew. The exact motive and orders of the pilot remain unclear, although Iraq later apologized for the attack, referring to the incident as "a mistake" and blaming Iran.

Prior to the outbreak of the 1991 Gulf War, the Mirage F1EQ was the second most numerous type operated by the Iraqi Air Force (the most numerous being the MiG-21). On 17 January 1991, during the opening minutes of the conflict, an unarmed, United States Air Force (USAF) EF-111, crewed by Captain James A. Denton and Captain Brent D. Brandon scored a kill against an Iraqi Mirage F1EQ, which they managed to maneuver into the ground, making it the only F-111 to achieve an aerial victory over another aircraft. Later in the war, an Iraqi Mirage piloted by Capt. Nafie Al-Jubouri successfully downed an American EF-111 Raven through aerial maneuvering as it crashed while attempting to avoid a missile fired by Al-Jubouri.

Coalition forces shot down several Iraqi F1s during the Gulf War, such as six F1EQs that were shot down by USAF F-15 Eagles. A pair of F1EQs, which were preparing to carry out an attack on Saudi oil facilities were shot down by a Royal Saudi Air Force (RSAF) F-15C. Of a pre-conflict force of 88 Mirage F1EQs, 23 were destroyed in the war, a further six were damaged, 24 were flown to Iran and interned; only 23 aircraft remained in service by the end of the Gulf War. Of the 23 destroyed Iraqi Mirage F1EQs, 9 were claimed to have been destroyed in aerial combat.

=== Morocco ===
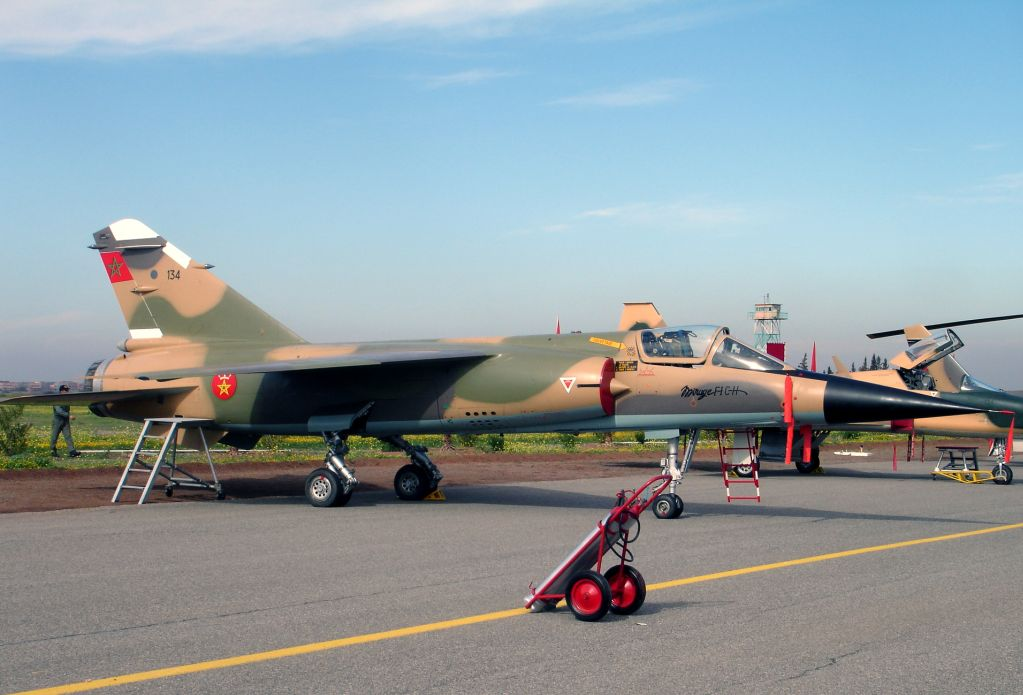
Moroccan Mirage F1CH (2007).

In December 1975, Morocco ordered 25 Mirage F1CH interceptors. In March 1977, an additional contract was signed, stipulating the delivery of five additional Mirage F1CHs, as well as 20 Mirage F1EHs (including six aircraft equipped with in-flight refuelling probes). The first deliveries to the Royal Moroccan Air Force (RMAF) took place in 1978. Moroccan Mirage F1s flew with three squadrons: Assad and Atlas, which were multi-role (interceptor and fighter-bomber) units, and Iguider, a specialised reconnaissance squadron. Comprising over a third of its fighter force, the Mirage F1 served as the primary air defence fighter of the RMAF for the next two decades.

Starting in October 1979, these aircraft were engaged in combat missions against the forces of the Polisario Front, operating in Western Sahara. During their early combat operations, Moroccan Mirage F1s used unguided bombs, rockets, and their internal cannons to attack Polisario targets. In November 1979, the first Moroccan Mirage F1 was shot down by a Polisario 9K31 Strela-1, and its pilot was killed. Another one was shot down by an SA-7 on 6 December, and two more followed in February 1980. With the losses to Polisario air defences mounting, Moroccan pilots started using toss bombing tactics to minimize their exposure to air defences, that had meanwhile been reinforced with 2K12 Kub/SA-6 medium-range SAM systems. Using this technique, in early January 1982, Moroccan Mirages even started attacking SA-6 sites. However, the strikes had very poor results, due to the inaccuracy of this technique. Moreover, the soft sand of the Sahara desert caused a lot of bombs to fail to detonate.

To solve these issues, several measures were taken. The Moroccans started using bombs equipped with daisy cutter fuses, and later South African-made Jupiter airburst fuses. Moroccan Mirages also starting operating in hunter-killer teams, with one aircraft fitted with long-range cameras and/or ESM equipment guiding one or two low-flying Mirage F1s to attack the targets it detected. These tactics proved highly successful, and they became the principal way in which Moroccan Mirages operated for the remainder of the war. Moreover, the aircraft were modified with chaff/flare dispensers. Lastly, ECM pods were bought to increase the aircraft's survivability against SA-6s, and the first were delivered in 1983. All this, combined with better training of the Moroccan pilots (including during joint exercises with the French and the Americans), resulted in much improved effectiveness of operations against Polisario forces. In total, over the course of the war in Western Sahara, twelve Mirage F1s were shot down by the POLISARIO. Four pilots were killed, and five were taken prisoner.

On 17 August 2015, a Moroccan Mirage F1 crashed due to a bird strike; its pilot ejected successfully.

=== Iran ===
Iran never purchased Mirage F.1s but did initially face them in the Iran-Iraq War, where they were some of the IQAF's most effective assets against Iranian Forces and trade in the Gulf. At least four F-14s - The IRIAF's most effective assets against Iraqi Aerial forces - were lost to "Giraffe" ambushes, and the Mirage F.1 scored the most confirmed kills against the type out of all fighters in Iraqi Service. During the Gulf War, the Mirage F.1 was one of the primary fighters used by the IQAF however, after a large-scale evacuation of Airforce Assets to Iran (on the condition that they would be returned to Iraq after the end of the war), a total of 24 ended up being interned in Iran. These were pressed into Iranian service and today are stationed in Southern Iran (some in the anti-shipping role after being modified with Nasr-1 Missiles) and in Eastern Iran. PL-7 Air to Air missiles have also been reportedly integrated on the Mirages, with Guided and free-fall bombs and attempts at integrating the Fakour-90 Missile. Most were initially part of the 140 TFW in the west of the country, near Mashhad which by 2004 had at least 18 operational airframes. It is believed that Pakistan may have been involved in supporting the operationalization, initial maintenance and upkeep of the Mirages until 1995, though the Iranians deny this officially. Iranian Mirages have been upgraded over time, including with new radars and avionics.

==== Afghanistan ====
Mirages of Iran have been used in various support roles against Balochi rebels and in Afghanistan, where one was lost to a Taliban MANPAD (a Strela-3 or 9K34) while on an anti-drug operation. The pilot involved, Nasser Habibi, lost his life and now has an Airbase in the Northeast named after him. it is known that Iranian Mirages flew dozens of missions against Taliban and other positions during the late 90s until 2001. As of December 2021, 12 Mirage F1EQs and 5 Mirage F1BQs were in active service

=== South Africa ===
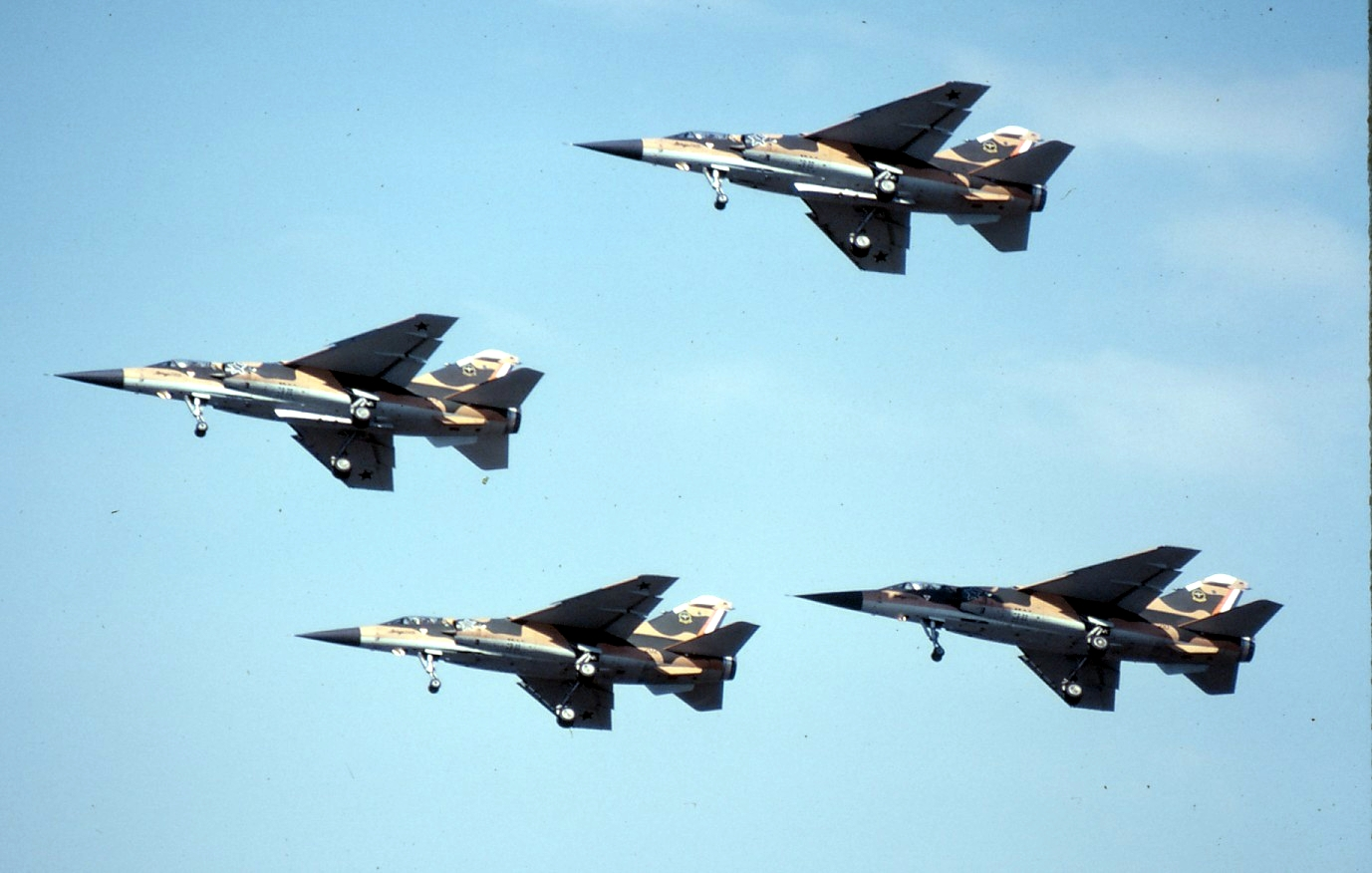
A formation of four Mirage F1CZs, flying over Air Force Base Ysterplaat, circa 1982.

During 1971, South Africa commenced its search for a replacement for the Mirage III; as a result, it chose to purchase a licence to manufacture both the Mirage F1 and its engine with the intention of producing up to 100 Mirage F1s. However, this license was quickly cancelled as a consequence of the impending 1977 arms embargo. The SAAF proceeded to procure 16 Mirage F1CZs and 32 Mirage F1AZs, which were quickly delivered by Dassault prior to the embargo being implemented, the first of these deliveries occurring in 1975.

Both the F1CZ and F1AZ variants of the South African Air Force (SAAF) saw considerable action during operations in the Border War. In November 1978, the first five F1CZs were deployed to South-West Africa (Namibia), tasked with providing escort for reconnaissance flights over Southern Angola. From 1980, such deployments as escort aircraft became regular. Due to teething problems with the F1AZ, F1CZs were initially assigned the strike role in southern Angola using Matra M155 rocket pods or 250 kg bombs.

F1CZs of 3 Squadron downed two Angolan MiG-21s in 1981 and 1982. On 6 November 1981, during Operation Daisy, two F1CZs were vectored by GCI to intercept two MiG-21s heading south. Major Johan Rankin shot down the wingman with cannon fire, as the missiles failed to lock on to the MiGs. On 5 October 1982, while escorting a Canberra of 12 Squadron on a photo-reconnaissance sortie, Rankin and his wingman engaged two MiG-21s on an intercept course. He fired two Magic AAMs at one of the MiGs, damaging the aircraft with the second missile. Rankin then attacked the second MiG and destroyed it with cannon fire. The first MiG was able to return to base, but sustained additional damage making a belly landing.

In May 1982, an Angolan Mi-8 helicopter that the SADF believed to be carrying senior officers was located and destroyed in the Cuvelai area. The helicopter was located with rotors running on the ground by a pair of F1CZs and destroyed by 30mm cannon fire.

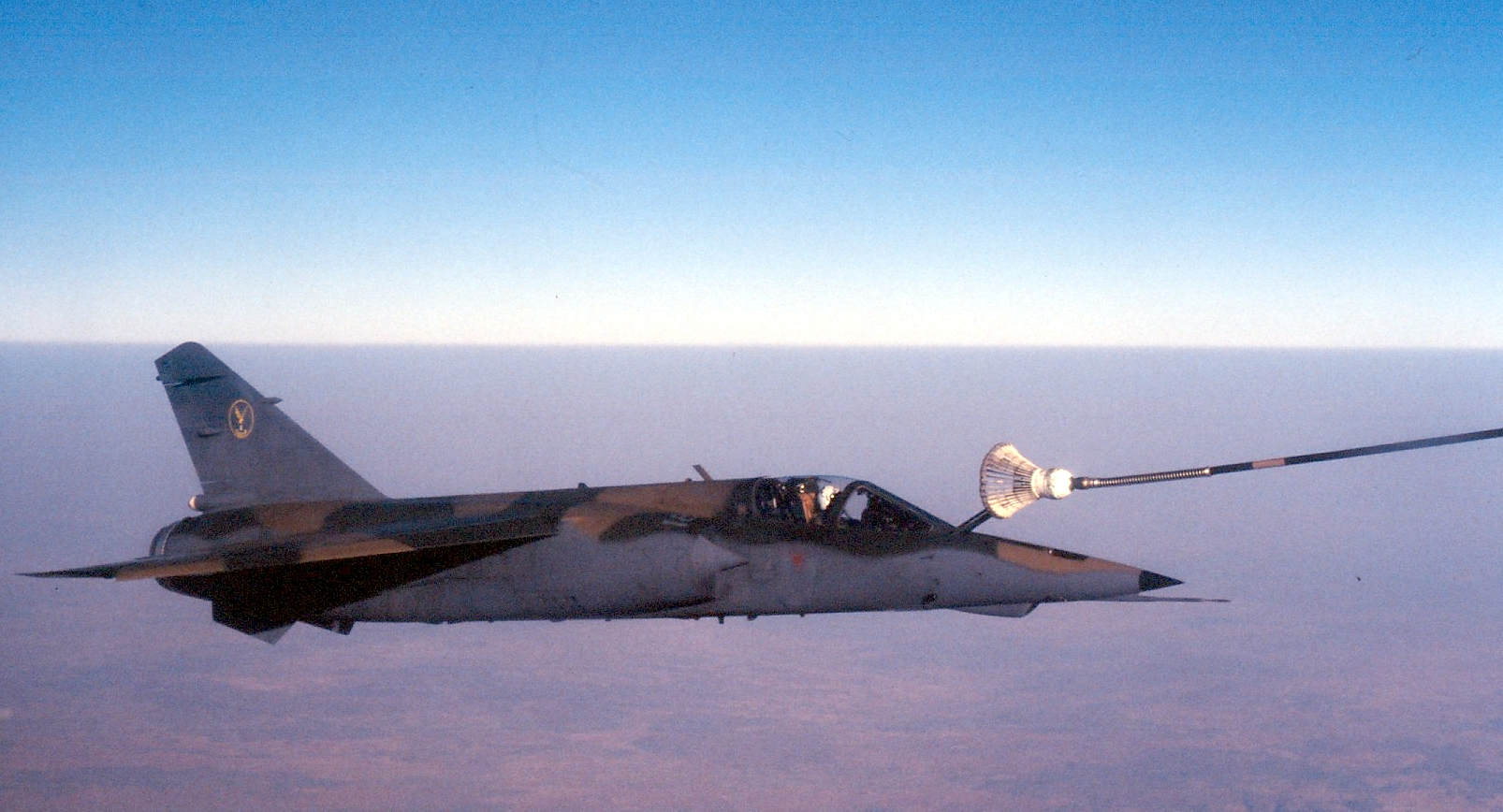
A Mirage F1AZ during air-to-air refueling

Two F1AZs of 1 Squadron were lost over Angola. On 20 February 1988, while flying an interdiction sortie in F1AZ '245' against a road convoy during Operation Hooper, Major Ed Every was shot down by an SA-13 Gopher SAM. F1AZ '223' was lost almost a month later, on 19 March, when Captain Willie van Coppenhagen flew into the ground while returning from a diversionary strike at night. A SAAF Board of Inquiry was unable to determine the causes of the crash.

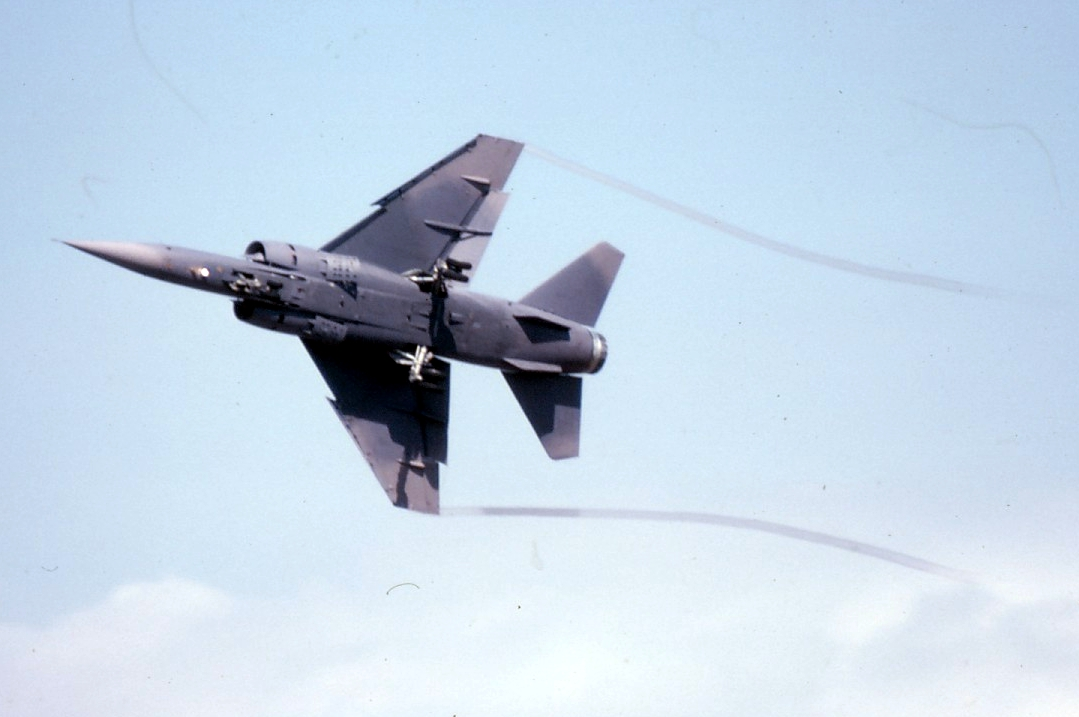
A SAAF Mirage F1CZ performing an aerial display at Air Force Base Ysterplaat, Cape Town, circa 1982.

Two F1AZs and a F1CZ were also damaged by enemy action, but were able to return to base. On 7 June 1980, while attacking SWAPO's Tobias Haneko Training Camp during Operation Sceptic (Smokeshell), Major Frans Pretorius and Captain IC du Plessis were both hit by SA-3 Goa SAMs. The aircraft piloted by Du Plessis was hit in a fuel line and he had to perform a deadstick landing at AFB Ondangwa. Pretorius's aircraft sustained heavier damage and had to divert to Ruacana forward airstrip, where he landed with only the main undercarriage extended. Both aircraft were repaired and returned to service. During the last phase of the Bush War, 683 combat sorties were flown by the F1AZs and more than 100 SAMs were fired at them.

On 27 September 1987, during Operation Moduler, an attempt was mounted to intercept two Cuban FAR MiG-23MLs. Captain Arthur Piercy's F1CZ was damaged by either an AA-7 Apex or AA-8 Aphid AAM fired head-on by Major Alberto Ley Rivas. The explosion destroyed the aircraft's drag chute and damaged the hydraulics. Piercy was able to recover to AFB Rundu, but the aircraft overshot the runway. The impact with the rough terrain caused Piercy's ejection seat to fire; he failed to separate from the seat and suffered major spinal injuries.

In February 1987, three F1AZs fired several V-3B missiles at a group of MiG-23s without success. This was repeated again in February 1988 when a F1AZ fired a missile at a MiG-23 and fired its 30mm cannon, again without success. Various other unsuccessful attempts were made during the 1987–88 period.

Apart from operations from Namibia in July 1981, a pilot of the Mozambican Air Force defected with his MiG-17. He flew from his base near Maputo towards South Africa. Two F1AZs returning from a training exercise intercepted the MiG-17. In March 1981 two F1AZs intercepted a Zimbabwean Army CASA C-212 and forced it to land in South Africa after asserting that the aircraft had strayed into South African airspace.

The SAAF lost an additional six F1AZs and three F1CZs to various mishaps. F1CZ '205' caught fire after landing and was repaired using the tail section of F1CZ '206' (Piercy's aircraft).

=== Spain ===
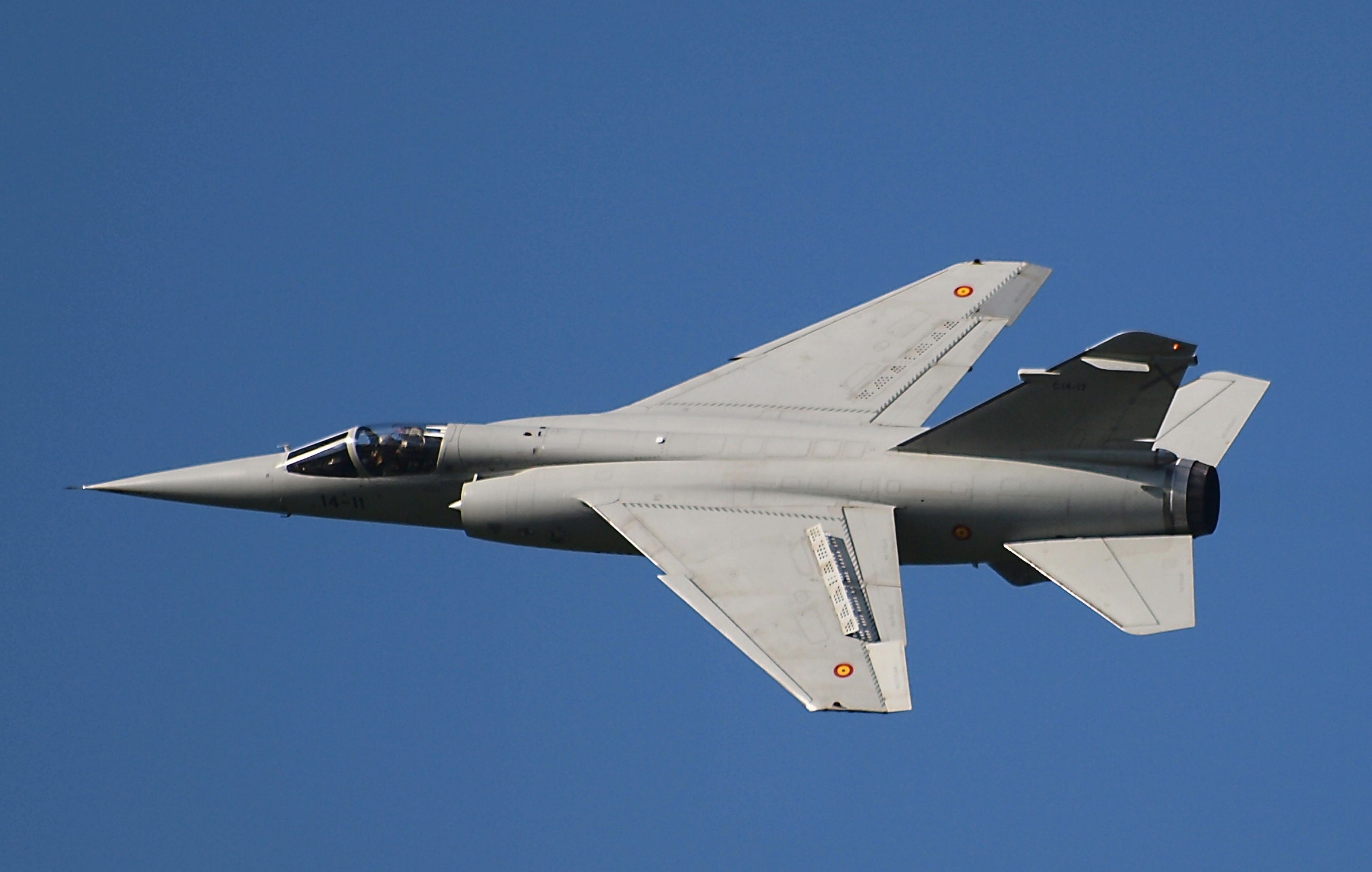
Spanish Air Force F1M at Kecskeméti Repülőnap 2010.

In June 1975, with tension growing with Morocco, Spain decided to strengthen its Air Force and bought 15 Mirage F1C that were allocated to Albacete AB. In mid-1976 there was still some tension with Morocco and Algerian and Libyan MiG-25 flights on the Mediterranean, which would lead the Spanish Air Force to purchase ten more Mirage F1C and two years later order 48 Mirage F1C and F1E.

Some years later Spain also bought 12 F1EDA/DDA's retired from Qatar Air Force, which donated some equipment and weapons used by those Mirage F1s. In Spanish service the F1CE was known as the C.14A, the F1EE was the C.14B and the two-seater F1EDA as the C.14C.

They served mainly as Spain's primary air defence interceptors and interdiction as secondary role until they were superseded by Spain's EF-18A Hornets. They served with Ala 11 (11th Wing) in Manises (Ex-Qatari planes), Ala 14 in Albacete, and Ala 46 at Gando in the Canary Islands. Ala 46 used their Mirage F1s mainly as air defence planes, using same deep blue color pattern as French planes.

In October 1996, Thomson-CSF was awarded a FFr700 million (US$96m) contract to upgrade 48 F1C/E single-seaters and 4 F1EDA trainers to Mirage F1M standard (see below). Ex-Qatar Mirage F1s were left outside the upgrade, as it was a different version, and were the first ones to be retired. As well as a service-life extension, this improved the avionics and added anti-shipping capability with a modernised Cyrano IVM radar and Exocet compatibility.

From July 2006 to November 2006, Spanish Mirage F1s were deployed to Lithuania as a part of NATO's Baltic Air Policing mission; during this deployment, they were scrambled twice to intercept undisclosed intruders. On 20 January 2009, a pair of Spanish F1s from the 14th Wing crashed near their base during a routine Spanish Air Force dogfight training mission, resulting in the deaths of all three crew members. The wreckage of the two jets, including the remains of the aircrew, was found about 3 km (1.9 mi) apart. By 2009, there were 38 F1M's in service with Escuadrón 141 (141st Squadron) "Patanes" and Escuadrón 142 (142nd Squadron) "Tigres" of Ala 14.

In 2013, the Spanish Air Force retired its fleet of Mirage F1s, having progressively phased the type out of service as increasing numbers of the Eurofighter Typhoon had become available. During 2013, it was reported that Spain may sell sixteen F1M's to Argentina but it seems they now have the budget to buy new Kfirs instead. The deal went through and Argentina bought the Spanish Mirages in October 2013, but the deal was scrapped in March 2014 after pressure from the United Kingdom on Spain to not assist in FAA modernization over tensions between the countries over the Falkland Islands. In November 2017, Draken International announced that it had acquired 22 F1Ms from Spain and would refurbish and upgrade them for use as adversary aircraft.

=== Libya ===
Libya procured 16 Mirage F1ED interceptors (equipped with R.530F SARH and R.550 Mk.1 IRH but no Super 530s), 6 F1BD two-seaters, and 16 Mirage F1ADs to equip the Libyan Air Force. The F1AD model is a specialized strike variant that lacks the standard radar unit; it is instead outfitted with a retractable fuel probe mounted on the nose and a laser rangefinder. Four F1ADs were subsequently upgraded into a multirole configuration.

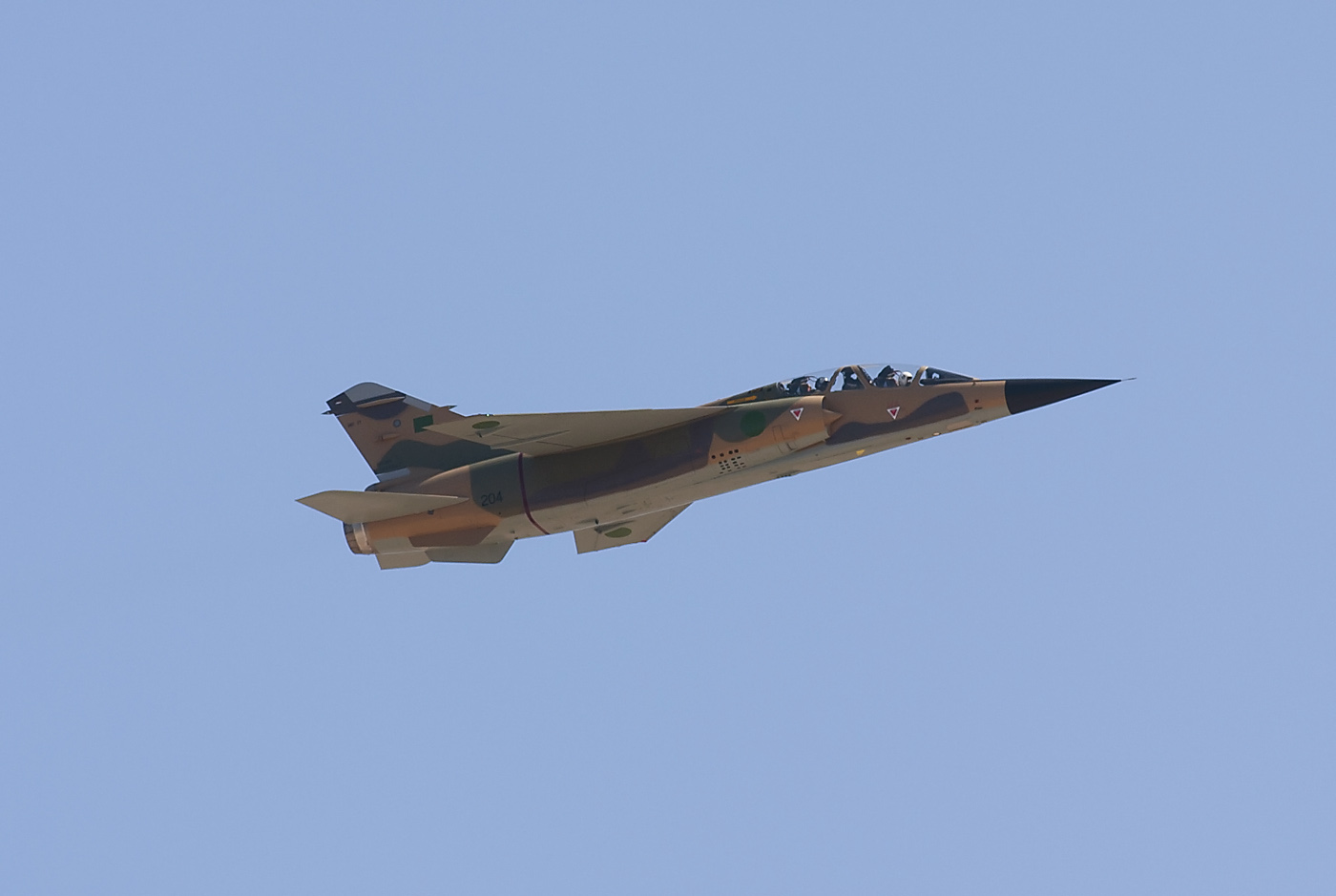
A Mirage F1BD, believed to be the only twin-seat aircraft of the type remaining in Libyan service at that time, 2009.

==== 1981 American - Libyan Standoff ====
Throughout the day of 18 August 1981, a total of 70 Libyan aircraft, including Mikoyan-Gurevich MiG-23s, MiG-25s, Sukhoi Su-22s, Su-22Ms and Mirage F1s, approached a US Navy carrier battle group as a show of strength. They were escorted until their withdrawal from its vicinity by McDonnell Douglas F-4 Phantom IIs and Grumman F-14 Tomcats.

==== Libyan Operation in Chad ====
Even though they weren't involved continuously, Libyan Mirage F1s participated in the war in Chad intensively and proved their worth during the Libyan campaigns through the 1980s. From 1981, a detachment was deployed at Marten es-Serra in southern Libya. Both the F1AD and F1ED versions were used in this war. Even though the Mirage F1ED was designed foremost as an interceptor, it was mainly used for ground attack purposes like the F1AD, although some combat air patrols were flown as well. When operating in Chad, the Mirage F1AD's typical combat configuration consisted of a pair of 1,300 litre (343 US gallons, 286 imp gallons) drop tanks and a pair of Belouga CBUs. Operations were performed almost exclusively during daylight hours and from high altitudes, which resulted in limited effectiveness. Together with Mirage 5s, MiG-23s, and Sukhoi Su-22s, Mirage F1s were instrumental in the success enjoyed during different campaigns against the Chadian troops in the early 1980s: operating over the open and barren desert terrain, they caused heavy damage, for no Mirage F1 losses in exchange.

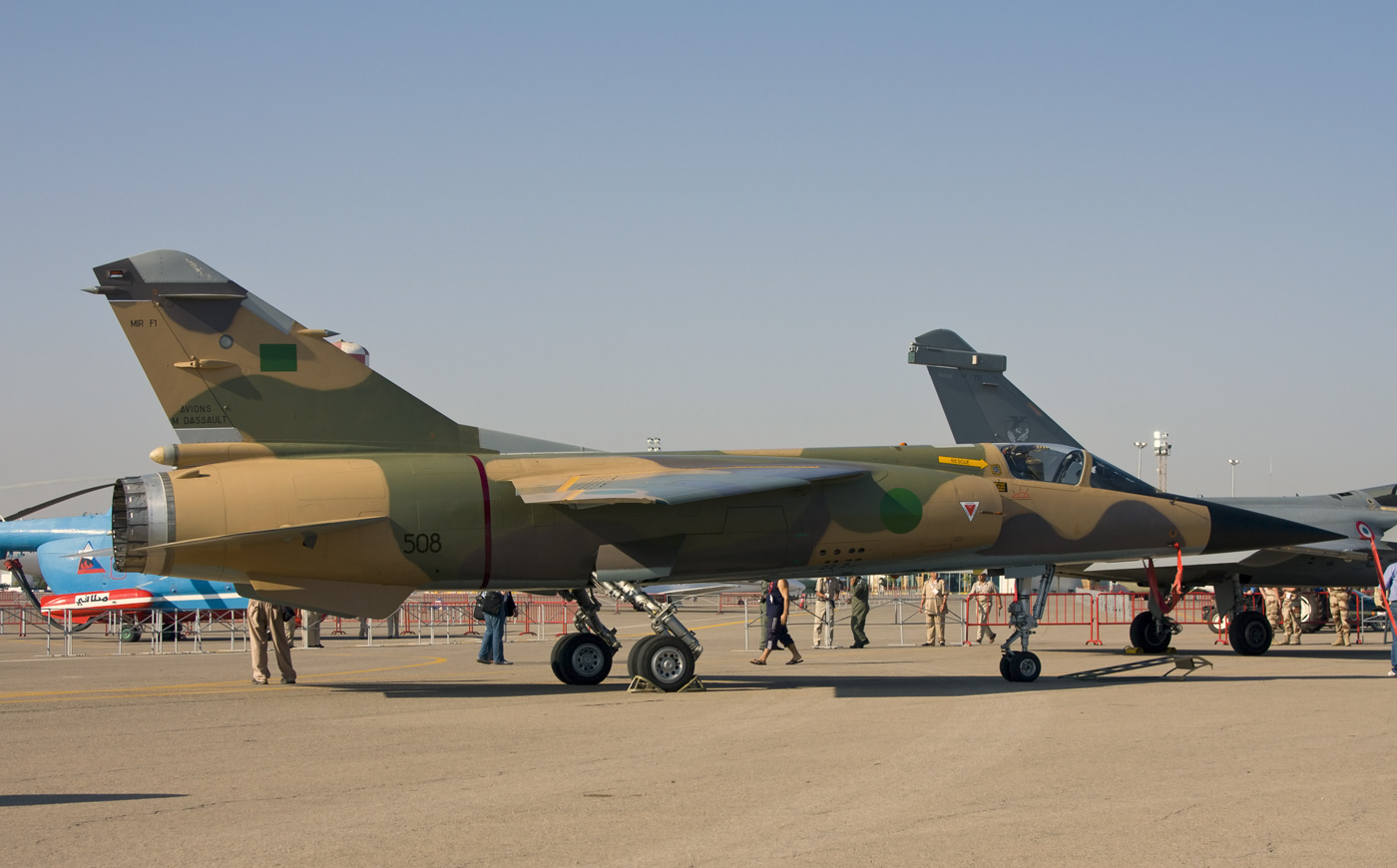
A Libyan Mirage F1ED in 2009.

Both Libyan Mirage F1 squadrons were staffed by some of the best pilots and officers in the Air Force, and the Libyans put extra care in the maintenance of these aircraft. Indeed, US Navy pilots involved in the 1981 encounters with Libyan fighters concluded that the Mirage F1 pilots were markedly superior to those flying Soviet-made aircraft.

The Mirage F1 fleet saw action during the 2011 Libyan Civil War. The Libyan Air Force posed little threat to coalition forces, partially as a result of insufficient equipment and a heavy reliance upon older aircraft acquired from the Soviet Union, but remained effective against poorly armed anti-Gaddafi rebels. On 21 February 2011, a pair of Libyan aircraft landed in Malta after they had been ordered to bomb protesters in Benghazi; both of the pilots claimed political asylum. Following the death of Muammar Gaddafi and the end of the civil war, France and Libya formed an agreement in 2012 to modernise the remaining Mirage F1 fleet, as well as covering the potential purchase of additional Mirage F1s that had been formerly operated by the French Air Force.

=== Kuwait ===
Kuwait ordered 33 Mirage F1s in 1974, following a border clash with Iraq (which has irridentist intentions in Kuwait), only five years after the acquisition of English Electric Lightnings from the UK for the Kuwait Air Force. Kuwait ordered 2 Mirage F1BK, 4 Mirage F1BK-2, 18 Mirage F1CK, and 9 Mirage F1CK-2, receiving them between 1975 and 1977 in the first batch, and until 1983 in the second batch. The first batch of F1s were painted in a desert camouflage scheme, with a sand and light brown disruptive camouflage pattern on top and light gray underneath, while the second batch were in overall gray air-superiority colors. The Kuwaiti F1CKs were basically F1Es, not F1Cs, and replaced Lightnings in Kuwaiti service, as the Kuwaitis had found the Lightning difficult to maintain and unsuitable for their needs. After the war, the Mirages, Hunters, and Lightnings were withdrawn and replaced with F/A-18C and D Hornets delivered by the United States.

==== Gulf War and Invasion of Kuwait ====
During the Iraqi invasion of Kuwait, as the Iraqi Air Force was late in their strikes on Kuwait in support of the ground offensive, Kuwaiti Mirages were able to support Kuwaiti ground forces consistently until Iraqi forces surrounded and attacked their bases. Kuwaiti Mirages claimed several enemy craft—mainly helicopters, and mostly with the R.550 Magic. Their kill claims total 13 Puma/Mi-8s (one with cannons, the rest missiles), two Gazelles, two Mi-24s, Two SU-22M4, one MiG-21 and an IL-76 transport, all on 2 August 1990.

Most of these kills (scored against helicopters) were part of the Kuwaiti Air Force's attempts to hamper the initial waves of Iraqi Commando raids into Kuwait City, seeking to capture the Emir of Kuwait and take key points in the city, and they were mostly successful in this endeavor. A part of the Mirage fleet—alongside Kuwaiti A-4 Skyhawks, Hawker Hunters and Lightnings fled to Saudi Arabia and fought in Operation Desert Storm to liberate Kuwait with the rest of the coalition.

== Variants ==
=== Mirage F1A ===
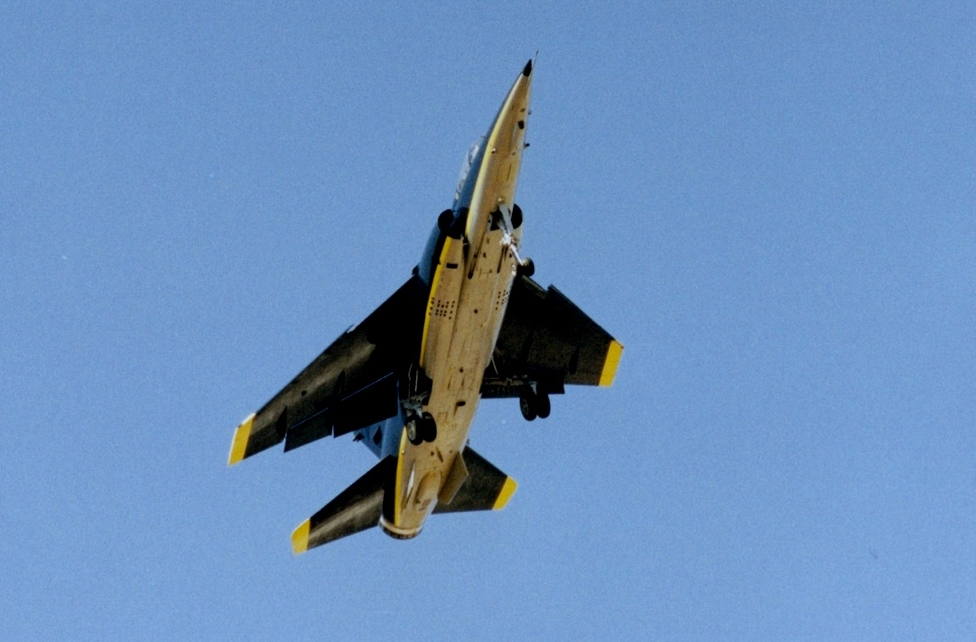
Underside view of a SAAF Mirage F1AZ flying overhead, 2002.

Single-seat ground-attack fighter aircraft, with limited daylight-only air-to-air capability. Fitted with lightweight EMD AIDA 2 ranging radar instead of Cyrano IV of other variants, with laser rangefinder under nose, retractible refuelling probe and more fuel.

- Mirage F1AD: Mirage F1A for Libya. 16 delivered 1978–1979.
- Mirage F1AZ: F1A for South Africa. 32 delivered 1975–1976.

=== Mirage F1B ===
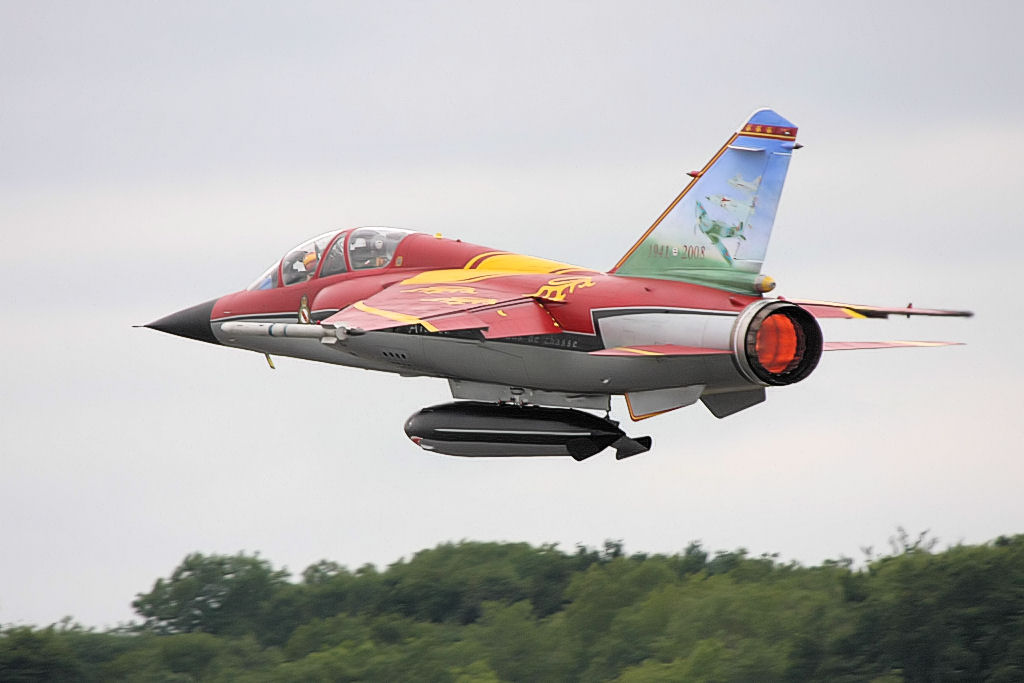
A Mirage F1B performing a flight display at the 2008 Royal International Air Tattoo.

The French Air Force also ordered 20 Mirage F1Bs, a two-seat operational conversion trainer; these were delivered between October 1980 and March 1983. The extra seat and controls added only 30 cm (12 in) to the length of the fuselage, but at the cost of less internal fuel capacity and the loss of the internal cannons.

The empty weight increased by 200 kg (440 lb), partly due to the addition of two Martin-Baker Mk 10 zero-zero ejection seats, in place of the Mk 4 used in the F1C, which had a forward speed limitation.

In all other aspects the F1B is a combat-capable aircraft and it can compensate for lost capacity with cannon pods and drop tanks.

- Mirage F1BD: Export version of the Mirage F1D for Libya. Six delivered 1978–1979.
- Mirage F1BE: Mirage F1B for Spain, local designation CE.14A. Six delivered 1980–1981.
- Mirage F1BJ : Mirage F1B for Jordan. Two built.
- Mirage F1BK : Export version of the Mirage F1B for Kuwait. Two built.
- Mirage F1BK-2 : Multi-role two-seater for Kuwait, equivalent to F1Dl. Four built.
- Mirage F1BQ : Two-seat trainer for Iraq, some of which fitted with dummy flight refuelling probe. 18 ordered of which 15 were delivered between 1980 and 1989.

=== Mirage F1C ===
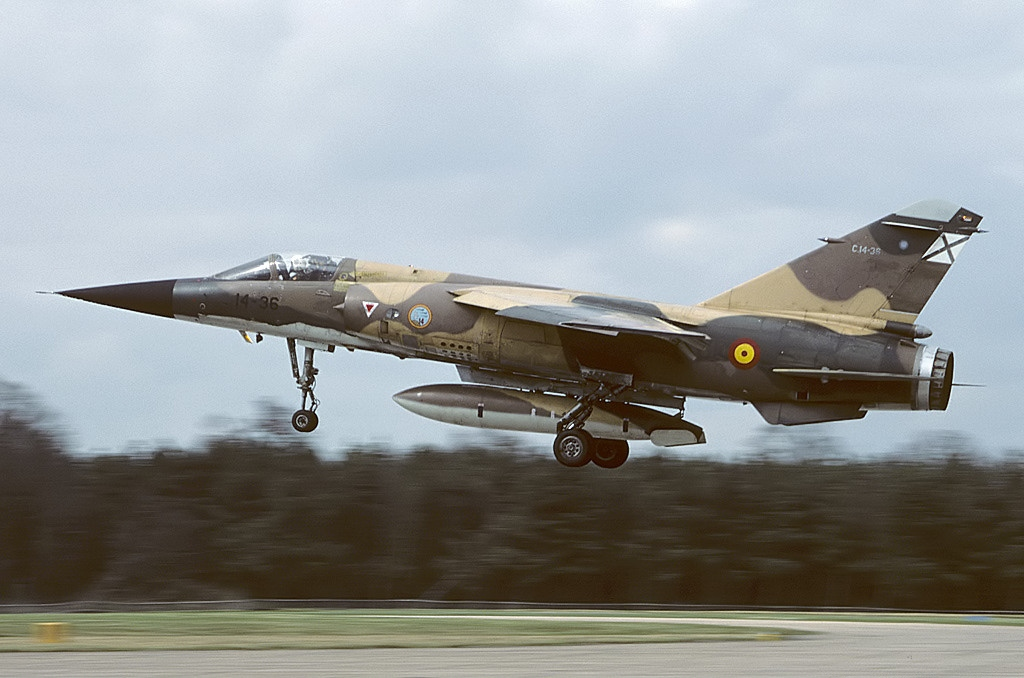
A Spanish Mirage F1CE at RAF Coltishall, England, 1988.

- Mirage F1C : Production interceptor version for the French Air Force
- Mirage F1C-200 : Designation for F1Cs fitted with refuelling probe.
- Mirage F1CE : Export version of the Mirage F1C for Spain, with local designation C.14A. 45 purchased in three batches, delivered between 1975 and 1981.
- Mirage F1CG : Export version of the Mirage F1C for Greece. 40 built, which were delivered between 1975 and 1978.
- Mirage F1CH : Export version of the Mirage F1C for Morocco. 30 built, delivered 1978–1979.
- Mirage F1CJ : Export version of the Mirage F1C for Jordan. 17 built.
- Mirage F1CK : Export version of the Mirage F1C for Kuwait. 18 built and delivered 1976–1977. Later upgraded to CK-2 standard.
- Mirage F1CK-2 : Nine multi-role aircraft, equivalent to the F1E, were sold to Kuwait as part of a follow-up order.
- Mirage F1CR : Tactical reconnaissance version for the French Air Force, bought to replace the Mirage IIIR.
- Mirage F1CT : Upgraded F1C-200 for the French Air Force to replace the Mirage IIIE in the close air support role.
- Mirage F1CZ : Export version of the Mirage F1C for South Africa. 16 delivered 1974–1975, with two further aircraft received to replace aircraft lost in a February 1979 collision.
- Mirage F1ED : Export version of the Mirage F1C for Libya. 16 built.

=== Mirage F1D ===
Two-seat training version, based on the Mirage F1E multi-role fighter, ground-attack aircraft.

- Mirage F1DDA : Export version of the Mirage F1D for Qatar. Two built.

=== Mirage F1E ===
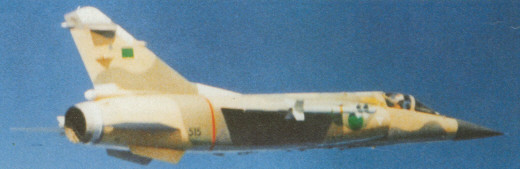
A Mirage F1ED of the Libyan Air Force, August 1981.

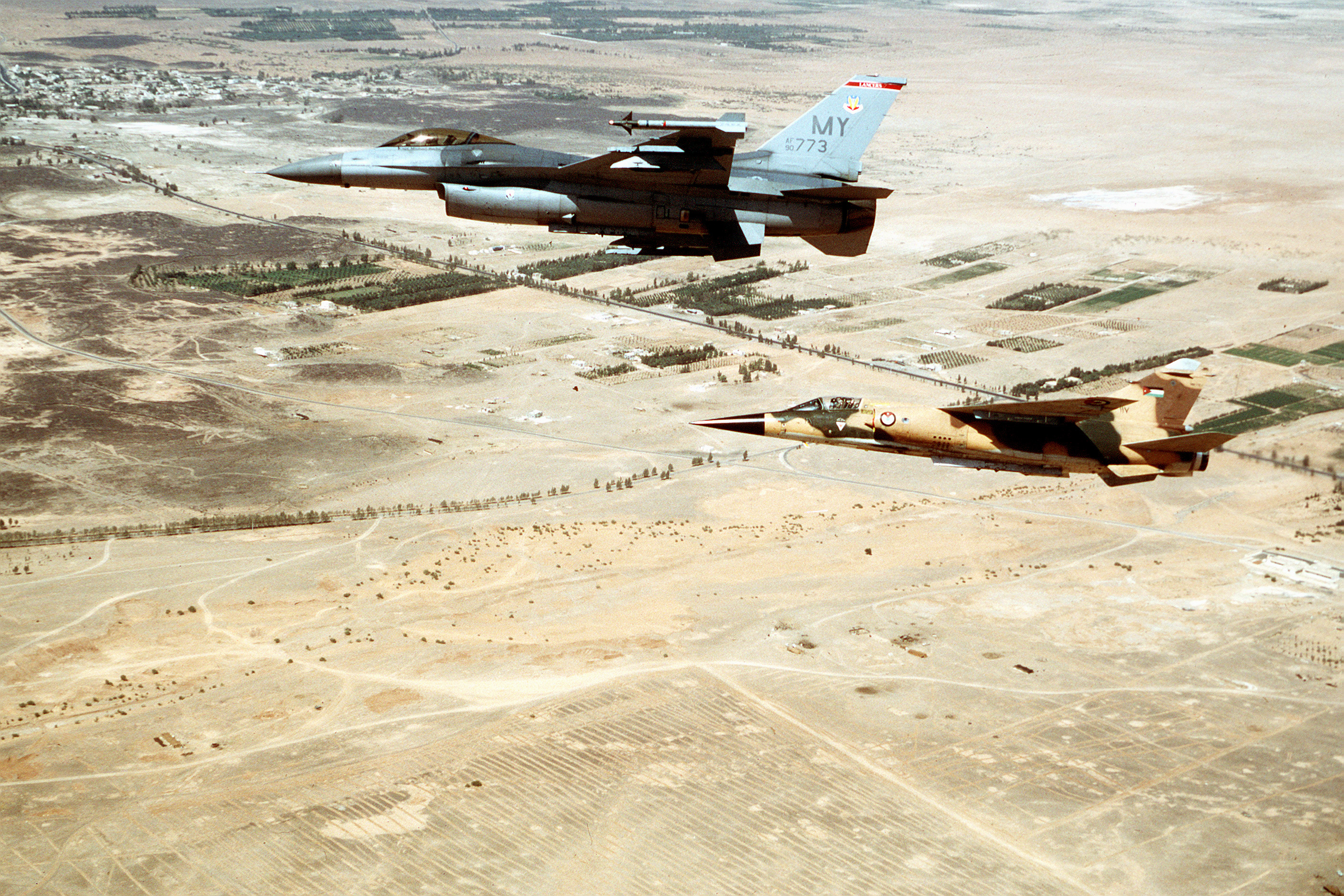
A Jordanian Mirage F1EJ in formation with an American F-16 Fighting Falcon over Iraq, 1996.

Single-seat all-weather multi-role fighter and ground-attack aircraft.

- Mirage F1JA : Export version of the Mirage F1E for Ecuador. 16 built.
- Mirage F1EE : Export version of the Mirage F1E for Spain. 22 built.
- Mirage F1EH : Export version of the Mirage F1E for Morocco. 14 built, delivered between 1979 and 1982.
- Mirage F1EH-200 : Moroccan aircraft fitted with an in-flight refuelling probe. Six built.
- Mirage F1EJ : Export version of the Mirage F1E for Jordan. 17 built.
- Mirage F1EQ : Export version of the Mirage F1E for Iraq. 16 built.
- Mirage F1EQ-2 : Single-seat air defence fighter version for Iraq. 16 new-build and 16 upgraded F1EQs.
- Mirage F1EQ-4 : Single-seat multi-role fighter, ground-attack, reconnaissance version for Iraq. First Iraqi version fitted with a refuelling probe. 28 built.
- Mirage F1EQ-5 : Single-seat multi-role version for Iraq. First Iraqi Exocet-capable version thanks to a new Cyrano IVQ/C5 radar. Also capable of using laser-guided munitions. 20 built.
- Mirage F1EQ-6 : Single-seat multi-role version for Iraq, with new Sherloc digital RWR, new Cyrano IV-SP1 radar, and capable of carrying two Exocet missiles at once. 30 built.
- Mirage F1EDA : Export version of the Mirage F1E for Qatar. 12 built.

=== Mirage F1CR ===
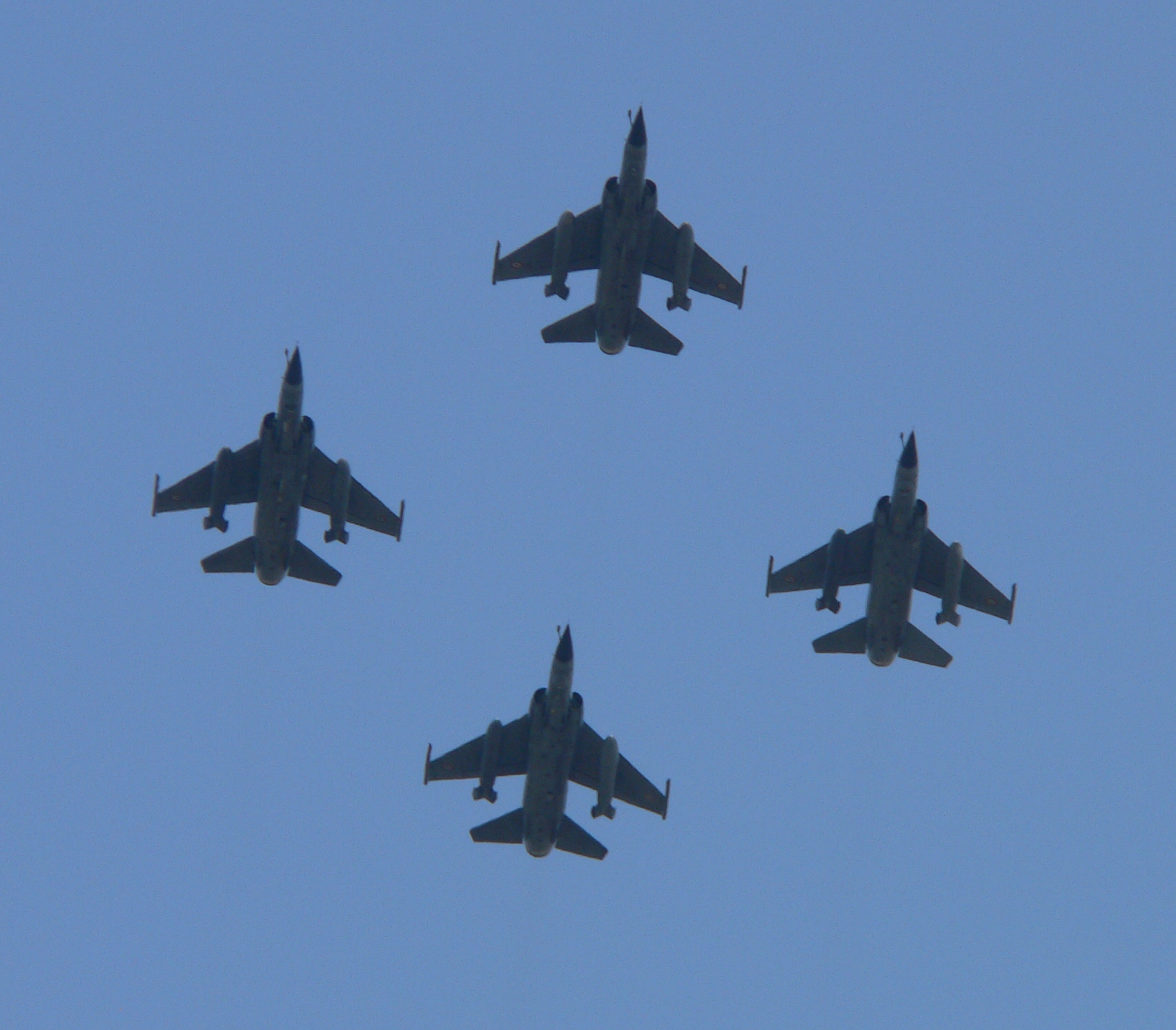
A formation of four Mirage F1CRs flying over Avenue des Champs-Élysées, Paris, 2006.

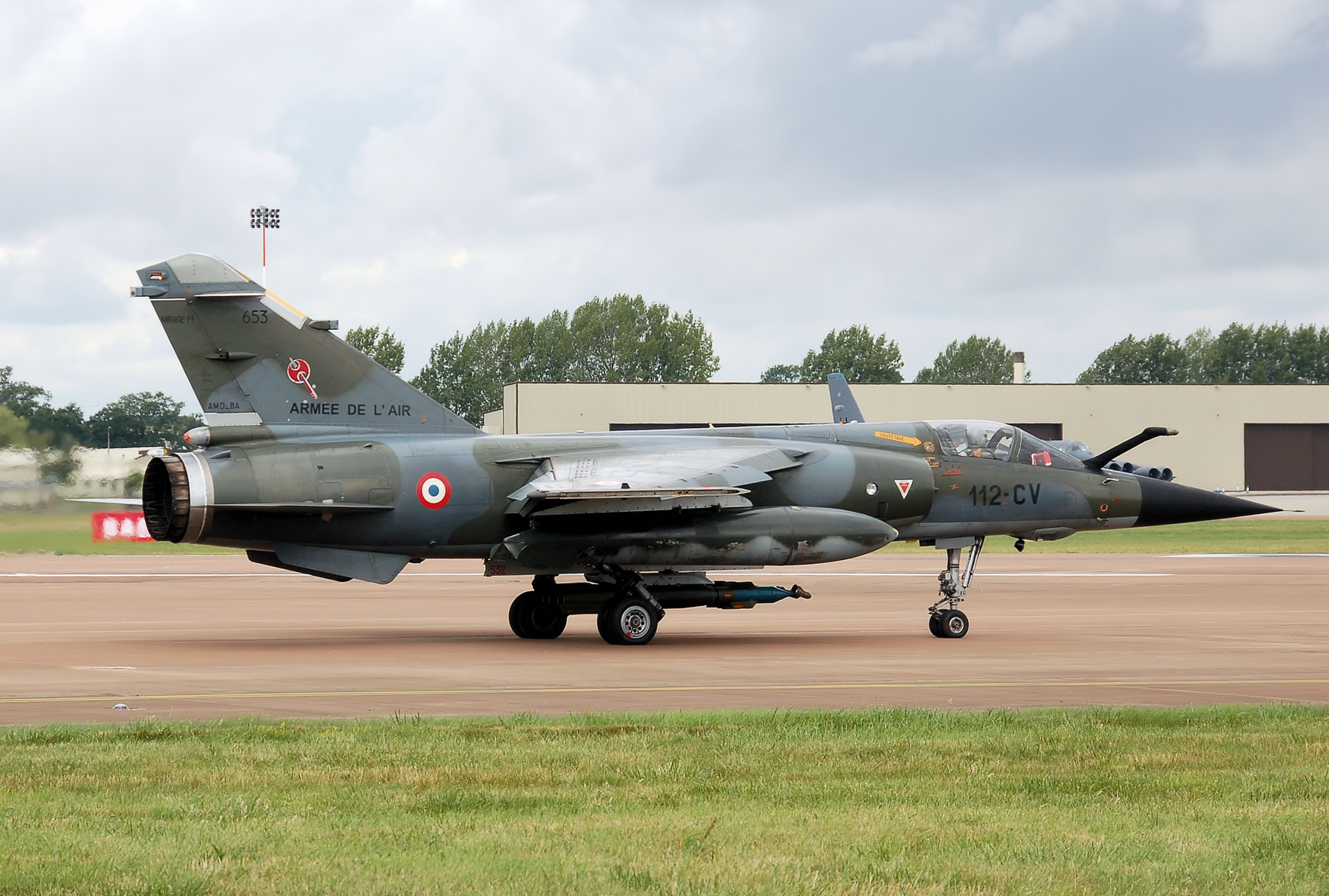
A French Air Force Mirage F1CR at the 2009 Royal International Air Tattoo.

When it became clear that the Mirage F1 was becoming a successful production aircraft, Dassault began investigating the possibility of a dedicated reconnaissance version for its most important client, the French Air Force. However, the escalating cost of fighter aircraft meant that add-on pods for this purpose were a more economical alternative.

Many French Air Force aircraft, as well as those of some export clients (such as Iraq's Mirage F1EQ), did indeed have a variety of reconnaissance pods available, which were attached to the underside of the main fuselage. However, the development of a tactical reconnaissance aircraft for the French Air Force continued, and the first Mirage F1CR flew on 20 November 1981.

The Mirage F1CR carries reconnaissance equipment, internally and externally:

- A SAT SCM2400 Super Cyclope infrared linescan unit is installed in the space previously occupied by the port cannon.
- A space under the nose can be used for a Thomson-TRT 40 panoramic camera or a Thomson-TRT 33 vertical camera.
- The Cyrano IVM-R radar has extra ground- and contour-mapping modules.
- A variety of sensors can be carried in external pods carried under the fuselage centreline. These include the Raphaël TH Side-Looking Airborne Radar (SLAR), the ASTAC ELINT pod and the RP35P optical reconnaissance pod.

A total of 64 Mirage F1CRs were ordered by the French Air Force. The first air force unit equipped with the CR was Escadron de Reconnaissance 2/33 which became operational in September 1983.

=== Mirage F1CT ===
The Mirage F1CT is a ground attack version of the Mirage F1C-200. Following their replacement in the air defence role by the Mirage 2000, the French Air Force had a number of surplus Mirage F1C-200s, and in 1988 it launched a conversion programme to turn these aircraft into interim ground attack aircraft to replace elderly Mirage IIIEs and Mirage 5s. The Mirage F1CT program brought the avionics of the F1C up to the standard of the F1CR, with the radar upgraded with the additional air-to-ground modes of the Cyrano IVM-R, an improved navigation/attack system fitted, with a laser rangefinder fitted under the nose. It was fitted with new Mk 10 ejection seats, while improved radar detection and warning devices, chaff/flare dispensers, and secure radios were also added. It gained the ability to carry a variety of air-to-ground weapons, including rockets, cluster bombs and laser-guided bombs, while retaining the F1C's air-to-air armament.

Two prototypes were converted by Dassault, the first flying on 3 May 1991, with a further 55 converted by the workshops of the French Air Force at Clermont Ferrand by 1995.

=== Mirage F1AZ and F1CZ ===
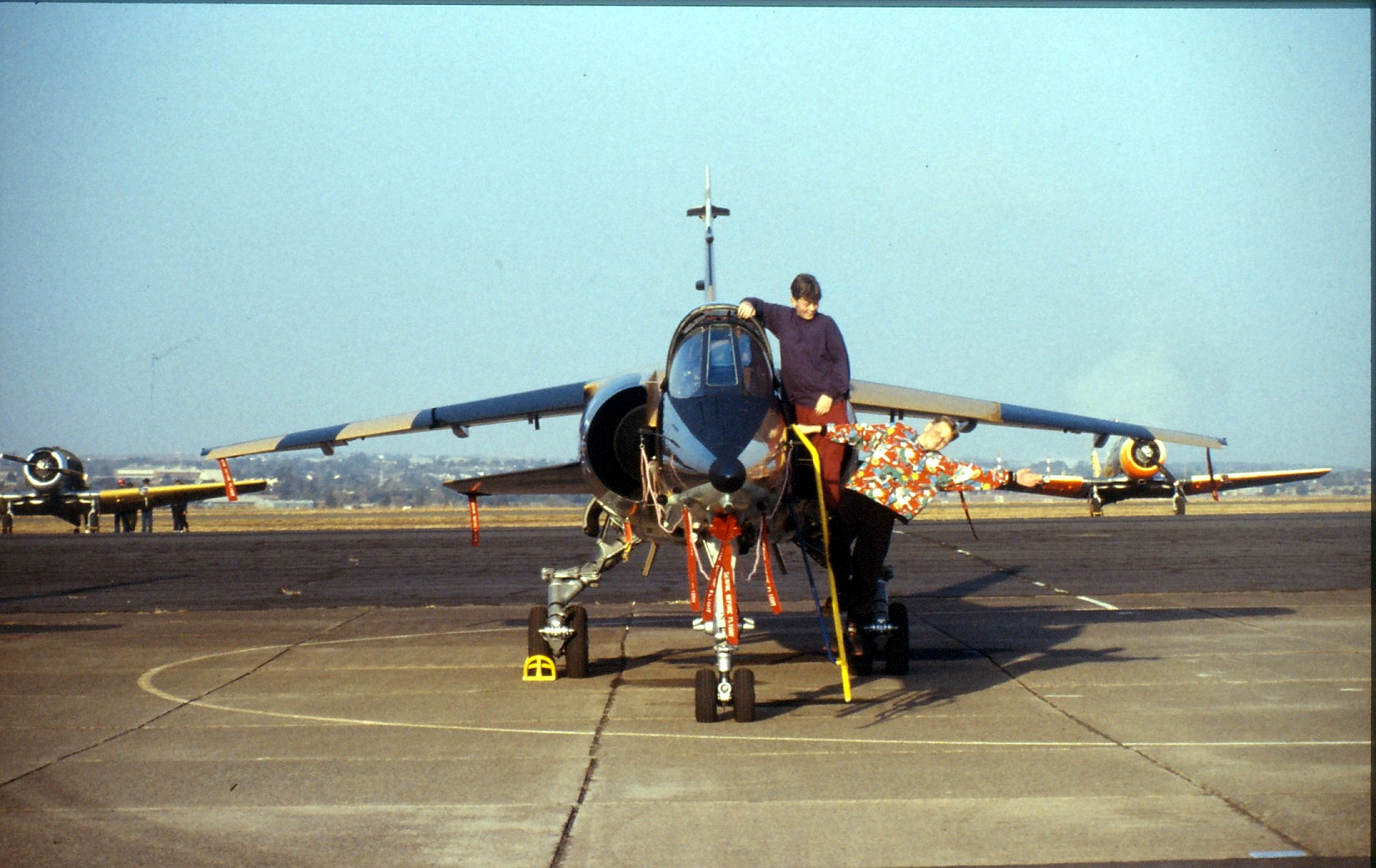
A Mirage F1AZ at Air Force Base Swartkop, Gauteng, circa 1996.

The South African Air Force (SAAF) flew both the Mirage F1AZ ground-attack version as well as the radar-equipped Mirage F1CZ fighter. The first two examples of the first order (48 aircraft, comprising 32 F1AZ and 16 F1CZ) were delivered on 5 April 1975. In July of that year, the remainder of the F1CZs were delivered and 3 Squadron was recommissioned to operate the aircraft from AFB Waterkloof. In 1975 the F1CZs also appeared at a South African airshow, the public were not informed that it was already in service.

The F1AZ was developed in conjunction with Dassault and the SAAF as a dedicated ground attack variant. The F1AZs were delivered between November 1975 and October 1976 and were assigned to 1 Squadron. Paramount Group, a South African-based company owns the intellectual property for the Mirage F1AZ.

The F1AZ has a laser-based rangefinder, permitting the highly accurate fusing and aiming of unguided munitions, such as bombs and rockets. Optical design was by the Optics (later ELOPTRO) division of Armscor in South Africa. The F1AZ features an integrated ground-attack system, comprising two on-board computers that can identify targets at a distance of 5 km (3 mi, 2.6 nmi). A laser range finder, situated below its conical nose, is connected to the computers to provide them with target info without emitting radar signals. After target identification and information gathering, bombs are automatically released at the right moment, known as CCRP, or 'Computer Controlled Release Point'. While the range-finding ability of the EMD AIDA 2 radar permits the use of combat and visual interception missiles, the helmet-mounted sight element enables the pilot to make off-boresight engagements, without waiting until achieving an optimum firing position. The F1AZ is equipped with two internal DEFA 30mm cannons with 125 rounds each, and carries a wide variety of external ordnance, including various types of bombs, cluster munitions, missiles, and rocket launchers.

The SAAF retired the F1CZs in 1992, followed by the F1AZs in 1997.

Despite their retirement in 1997, the accuracy of the F1AZ's armament delivery is still considered classified information by the SAAF; analysis by informed news services (e.g., Jane's Defence Weekly) and pilot reports (e.g., Commandant Dick Lord, 'Vlamgat', 1999) conclude that the F1AZ has accuracies within the order disclosed by the USAF for their F-15E Strike Eagle in unguided ballistic mode.

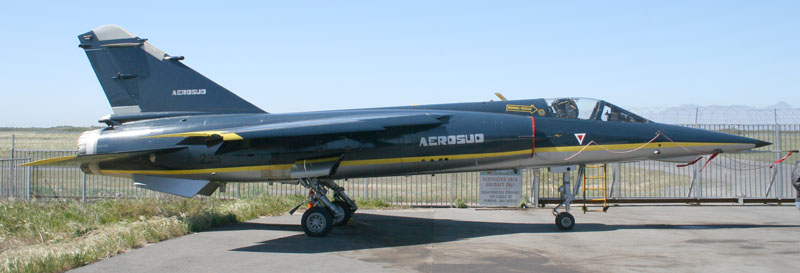
Aerosud Mirage F1.

In 2004, up to 21 F1AZs were reported in storage at AFB Hoedspruit, awaiting a possible buyer. In April 2006, it was reported that Aerosud had purchased the surviving Mirage F1AZs and spares.

South Africa granted Aerosud a contract to fit the Dassault Mirage F1 with the Klimov RD-33 engine used in the MiG-29 fighter. Although overtaken by the decision of the South African Air Force to buy the SAAB JAS 39 Gripen, the upgrade was technically successful.

On 17 August 2006, French news agency Agence France-Presse (AFP) reported that two upgraded ex-South African F1AZs had taken part in a fly-past over Libreville earlier that day in celebration of Gabon's independence day. The refurbishment and upgrade of the aircraft was carried out by Aerosud. Aerosud Group managing director Dr. Paul Potgieter confirmed his company's involvement, but declined to give numbers or cite figures.

=== Mirage F1 M53 ===
Developed for the participation in the "European" NATO fighter competition of early seventies, seeking to replace the F-104G. It was equipped with a more powerful engine, the SNECMA M53, and other improvements. Failed to succeed, the contest was eventually won by the General Dynamics F-16. The Mirage F1 came in second place.

=== Mirage F1M ===
The F1M upgrade (unrelated to the M-53 prototype) was applied to 48 Spanish F1CE/EE and four F1EDA trainers under a FFr700 million (US$96m) contract awarded to Thomson-CSF in October 1996. The prototype F1M flew in April 1998, and CASA delivered the remainder between March 1999 and 15 March 2001. The project included a revised cockpit with colour LCDs and a Smart HUD from Sextant Avionique, a Sextant inertial navigation system with GPS interface; NATO-compatible Have Quick 2 secure communications; Mode 4 digital IFF; a defensive aids suite; and flight recorders. The radar was upgraded to Cyrano IVM standard, adding sea search and air to ground ranging modes.

=== Mirage F1 MF2000 ===
The Royal Moroccan Air Force started in 2005 the 350 million euro MF2000 upgrade program to modernise 27 F1CH, F1EH and F1EH-200 aircraft. Changes included replacement of the old Cyrano IV radar by a RC400 (RDY-3) radar based on that used by the Mirage 2000-5, a revised cockpit, and improved armament, with Damocles targeting pods, MICA air-to-air missiles and AASM guided bombs added. This upgrade was performed by ASTRAC (Association Sagem Thales pour la Rénovation d'Avions de Combat).

== Operators ==
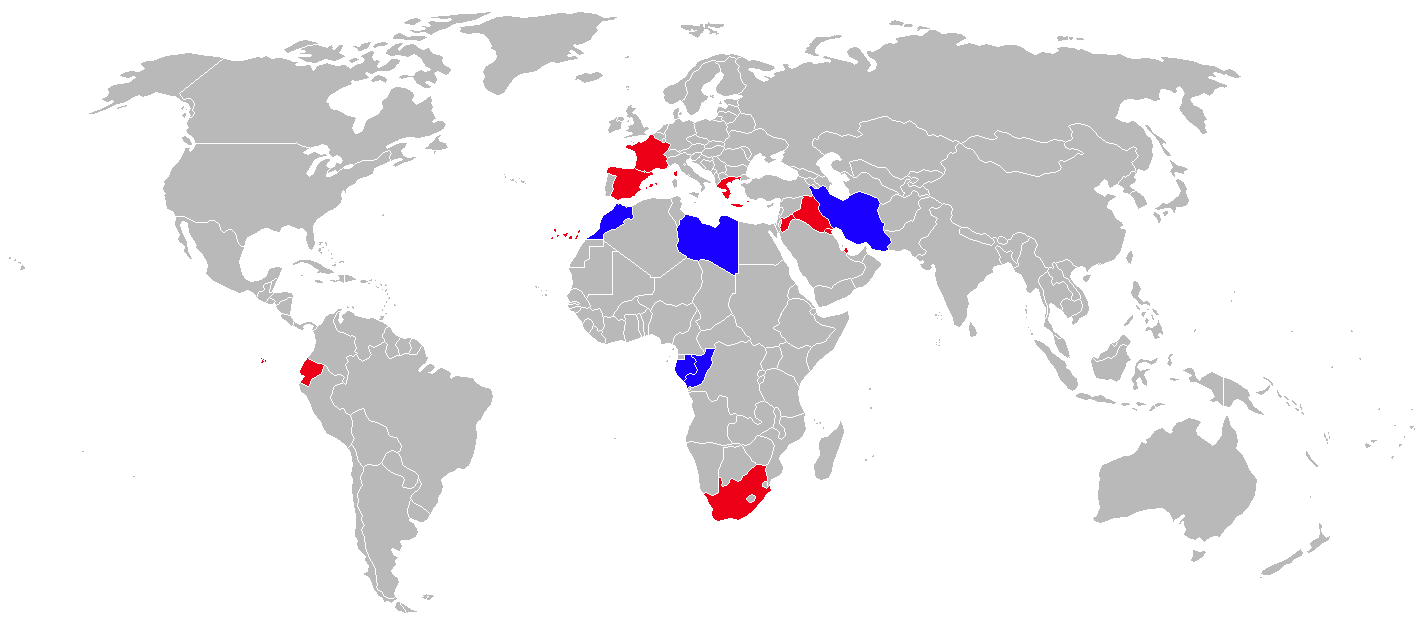
Mirage F1 operators. Current Former

The Dassault Mirage F1 has been operated by fourteen air forces, with five of them still doing so. Out of these, three have been European, five Middle Eastern (with one still flying the type), and five African (four still operating it).

=== Current operators ===
Congo, Republic of the

- Congolese Air Force two Mirage F1s in service as of December 2021.

Gabon

- Gabonese Air Force six Mirage F1s in service as of December 2021.

Iran

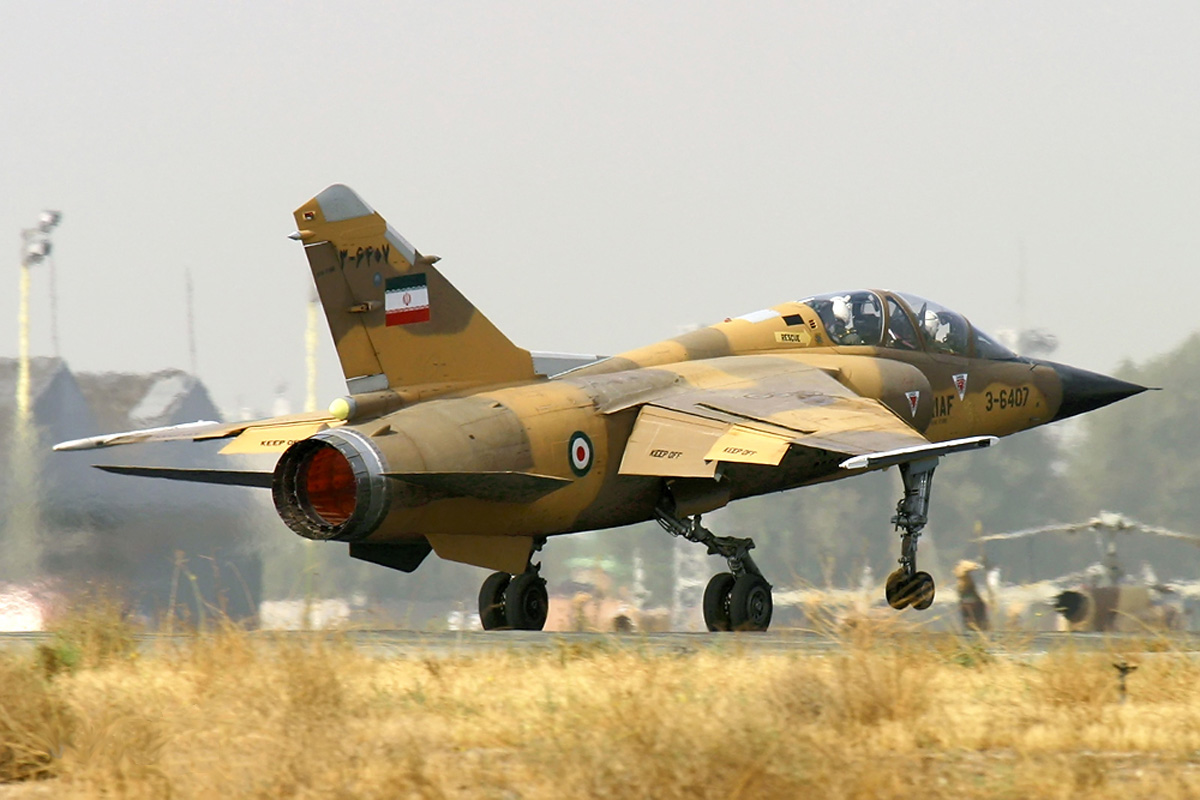
Iranian Air Force Mirage F1BQ.

- Islamic Republic of Iran Air Force seized 24 F1BQs and F1EQs flown over from Iraq, during the 1991 Persian Gulf War. As of December 2021, 12 Mirage F1EQs and 5 Mirage F1BQs were in service.

Libya

- Libyan Air Force received 16 F1AD, 6 F1BD and 16 F1ED aircraft. All were grounded but twelve were contracted for refurbishment, of which only four were returned to service. Of these twelve, two were taken to Malta when their pilots defected. France agreed to renovate Libya's small fleet of Mirage F1s and train its personnel as part of a defence co-operation agreement signed in 2012. Three Mirage F1 were reported lost during the western 2019 offensive.

Morocco

- Royal Moroccan Air Force received 30 F1CHs, 14 F1EHs and 6 F1EH-200s. 23 are still operational and 27 have been upgraded to ASTRAC standards.

=== Non-government/private military operators ===
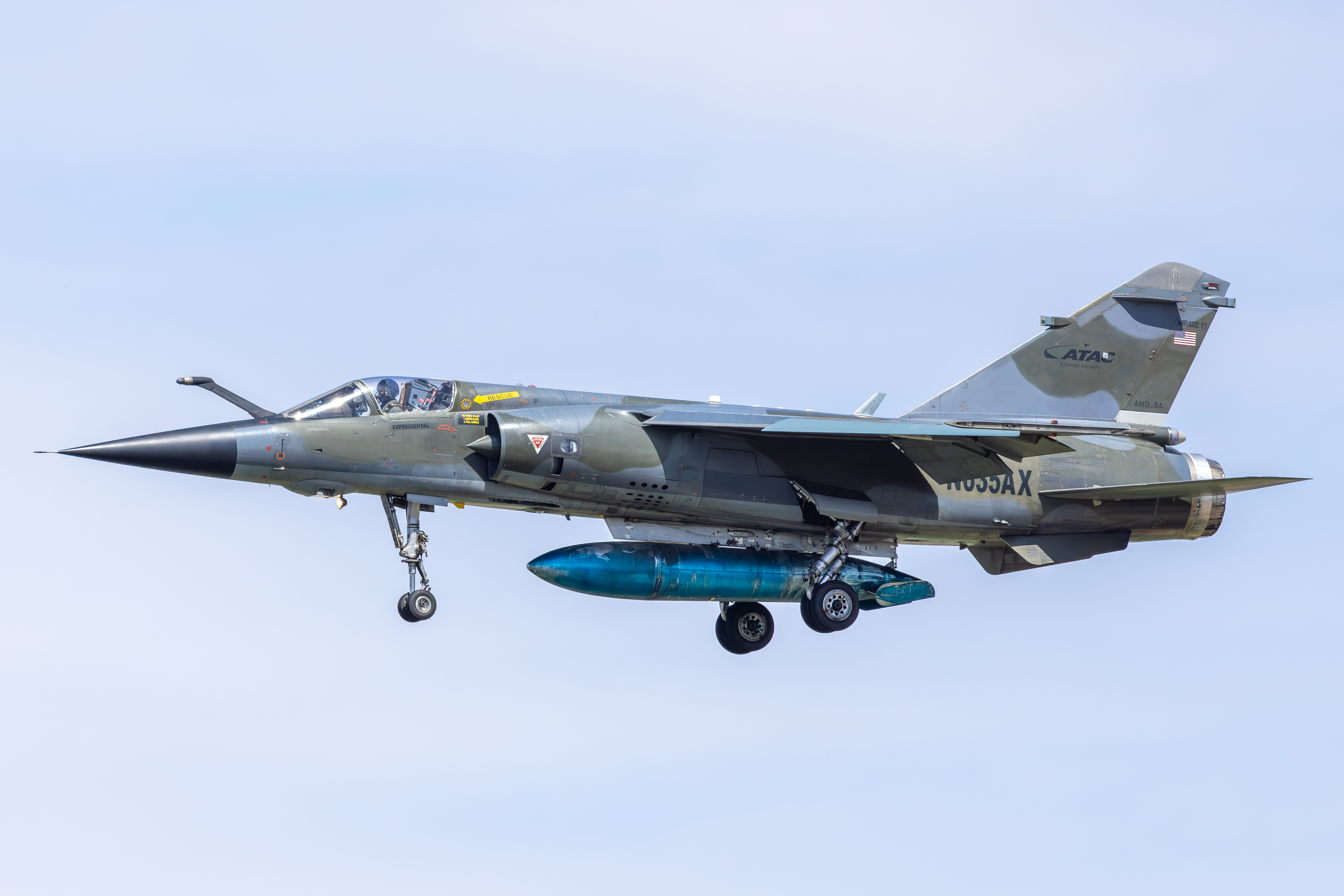
An Airborne Tactical Advantage Company Mirage F1CR, registration N635AX, landing at Luke Air Force Base, Arizona, in 2023

South Africa

- Paramount Aerospace Systems acquired four former French Air Force Mirage F1B.

United States

- Draken International has acquired 20 former Spanish Air Force Mirage F1Ms and 2 F1B aircraft for use in the Adversary Air role providing support to the United States Air Force. One plane was lost when it crashed on May 24, 2021.
- Textron subsidiary Airborne Tactical Advantage Company in 2017 acquired 63 former French Air Force Mirage F1B, F1CT, and F1CR for dissimilar air combat training and aggressor squadron purposes for the US Air Force. The intention is to have between 30 and 45 of them airworthy.
  - On 10 February 2022, an F1 crashed in an unpopulated area near Buckeye around 30 miles (48 km) west of Phoenix, Arizona, after the pilot ejected. The aircraft was operating from Luke Air Force Base, supporting the 56th Operations Group.

=== Former operators ===
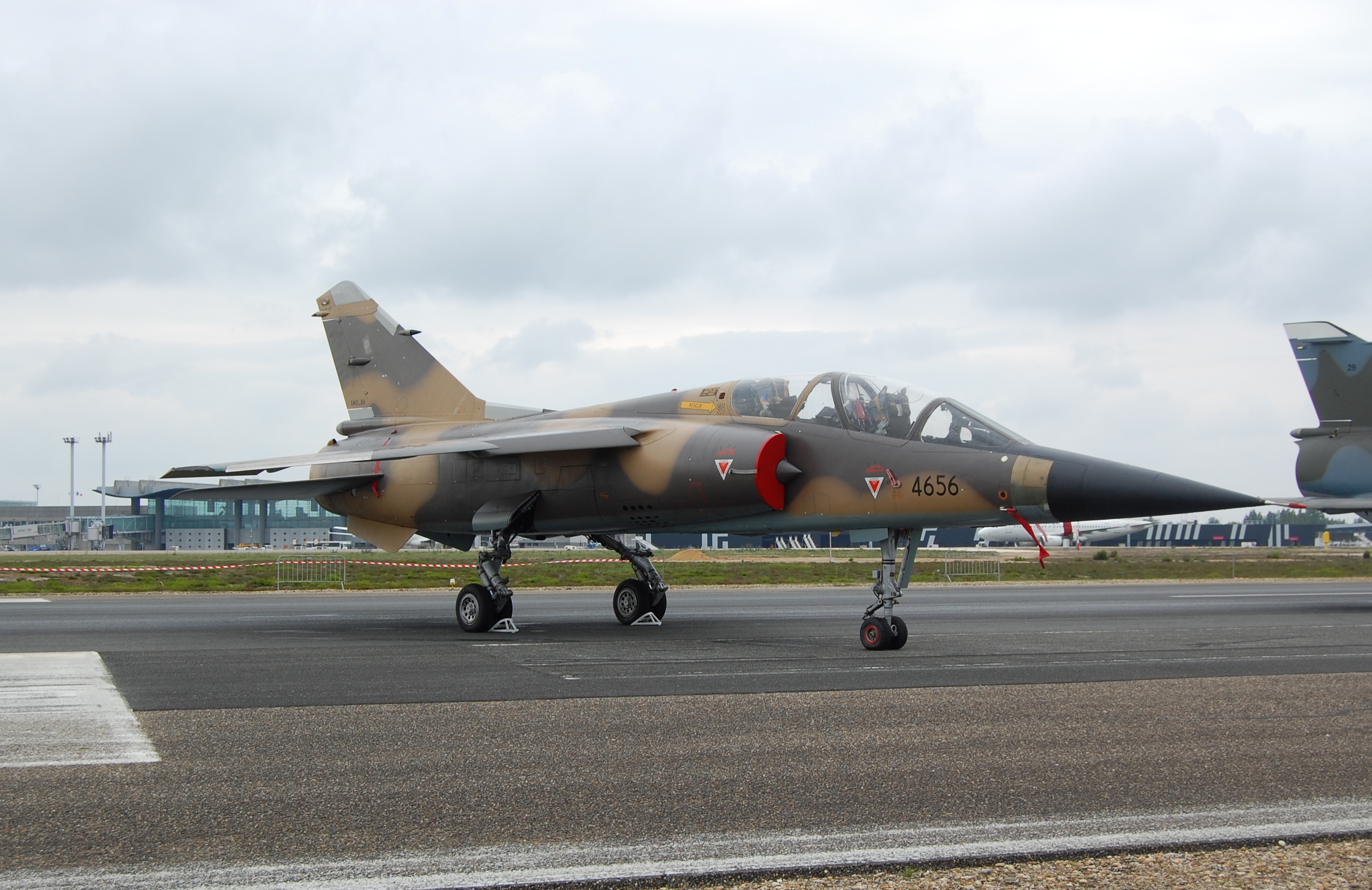
Iraqi Air Force Mirage F1BQ

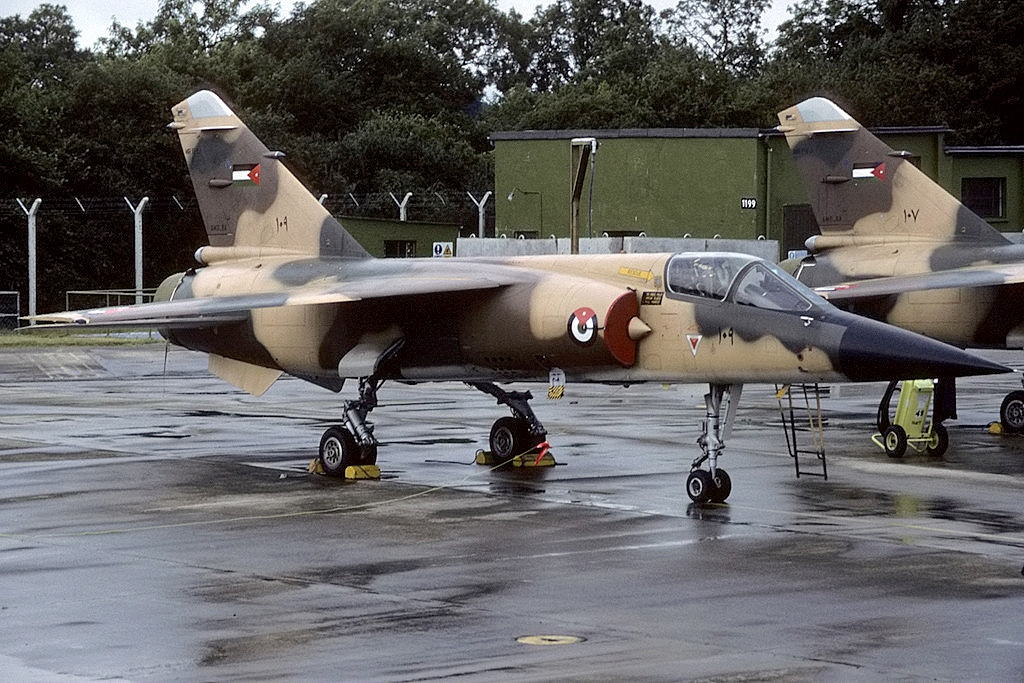
Jordanian Air Force Dassault Mirage F1EJ

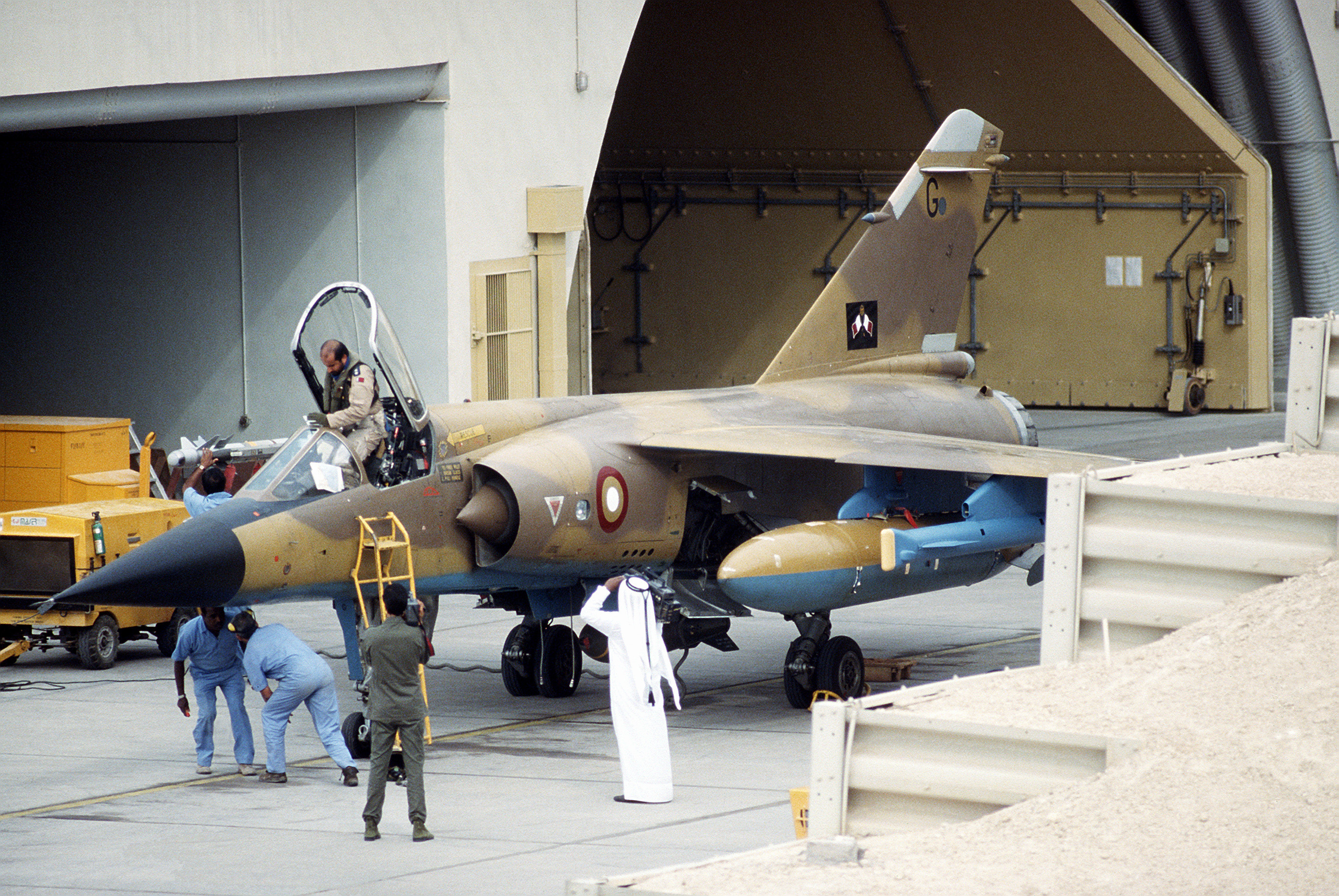
Qatari Air Force Mirage F1EDA

Ecuador

- Ecuadorian Air Force operated 16 F1JA & 2 F1JE. During their operational service, at least three of these aircraft were confirmed as lost in accidents. In February 2011, the remaining aircraft in the squadron were retired from service.

France

- French Air Force received 246 aircraft. The last squadron flying the aircraft was officially disbanded on 13 June 2014.

Greece

- Hellenic Air Force operated 40 F1CG.

Iraq

- Iraqi Air Force received 106 F1EQ & 15 F1BQ between 31 January 1981 and 1989, with a further 4 EQs and 4 trainers undelivered due to Iraq's inability to pay and the UN arms embargo imposed following the 1990 invasion of Kuwait. In early 2011, the French government offered to update and refurbish 18 French-held Mirage F1s and sell these to the Iraqi Air Force.

Jordan

- Royal Jordanian Air Force received 17 F1CJ, 17 F1EJ & 2 F1BJ. In 2010 it was reported that Argentina might lease twelve F1CJs and an F1BJ but nothing came of it.

Kuwait

- Kuwait Air Force operated 2 Mirage F1BK, 4 Mirage F1BK-2, 18 Mirage F1CK, and 9 Mirage F1CK-2. These 33 Mirage F1s were delivered between 1976 and 1977.

Libyan Arab Jamahiriya

- Libyan Air Force (1951–2011). Passed on to the successor government.

Qatar

- Qatar Air Force ordered 12 F1EDA & 2 F1DDA in 1979, which were delivered to Qatar between March 1983 and July 1984. A further F1DDA was supplied later as an attrition replacement. 13 aircraft were sold to Spain.

South Africa

- South African Air Force operated 32 F1AZ & 16 F1CZ.

Spain

- Spanish Air Force received originally 45 F1CE, 22 F1EE & 6 F1BE. They also acquired 24 second-hand examples from France and Qatar in the early 1990s. Spanish F1s were deployed in 2006 for the Baltic Air Policing mission. Finally, Spain decommissioned its Mirage F1 fleet in February 2013.

== Specifications (Mirage F1) ==
Dassault Mirage F1 3-view drawings

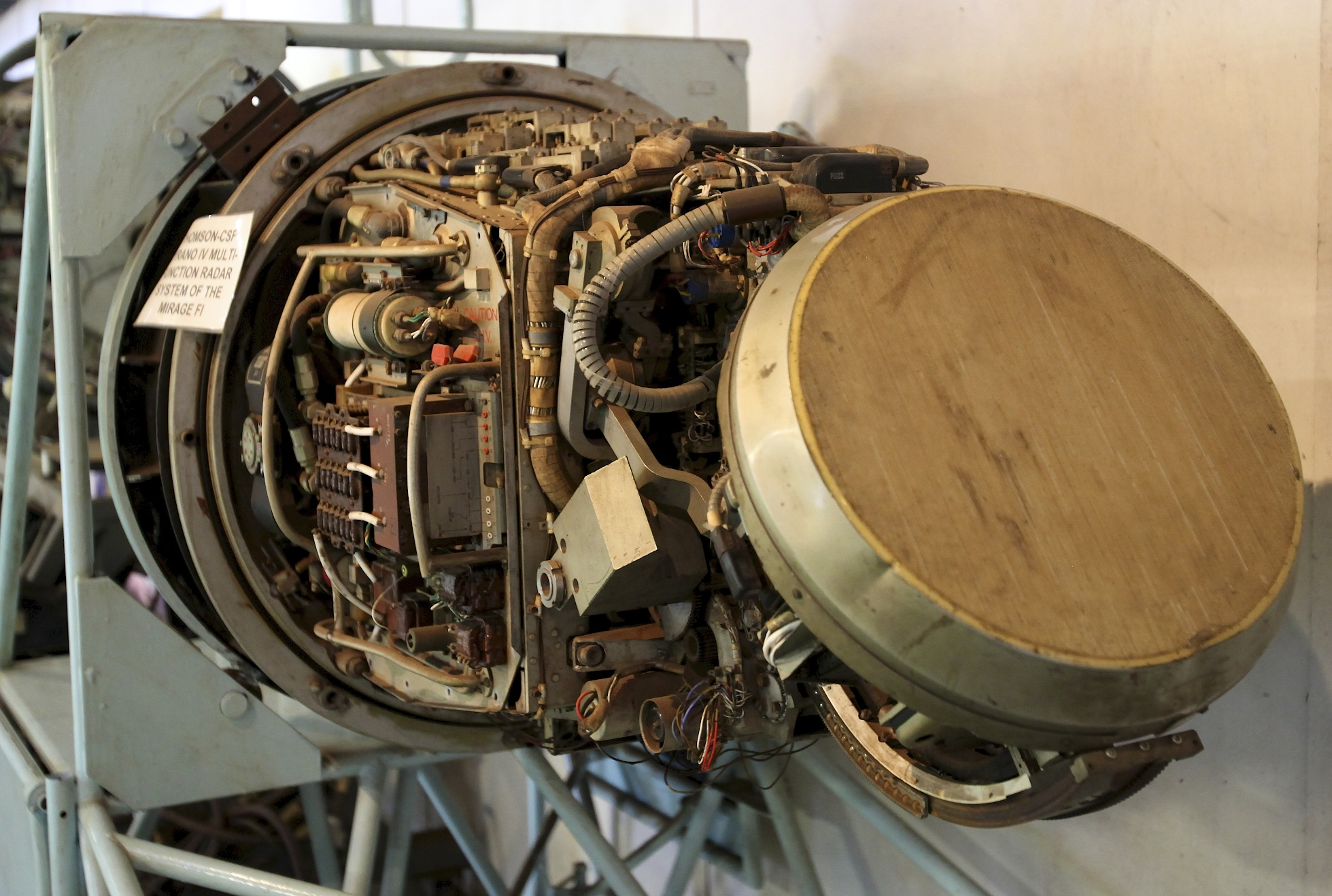
Thomson CSF Cyrano IV radar unit

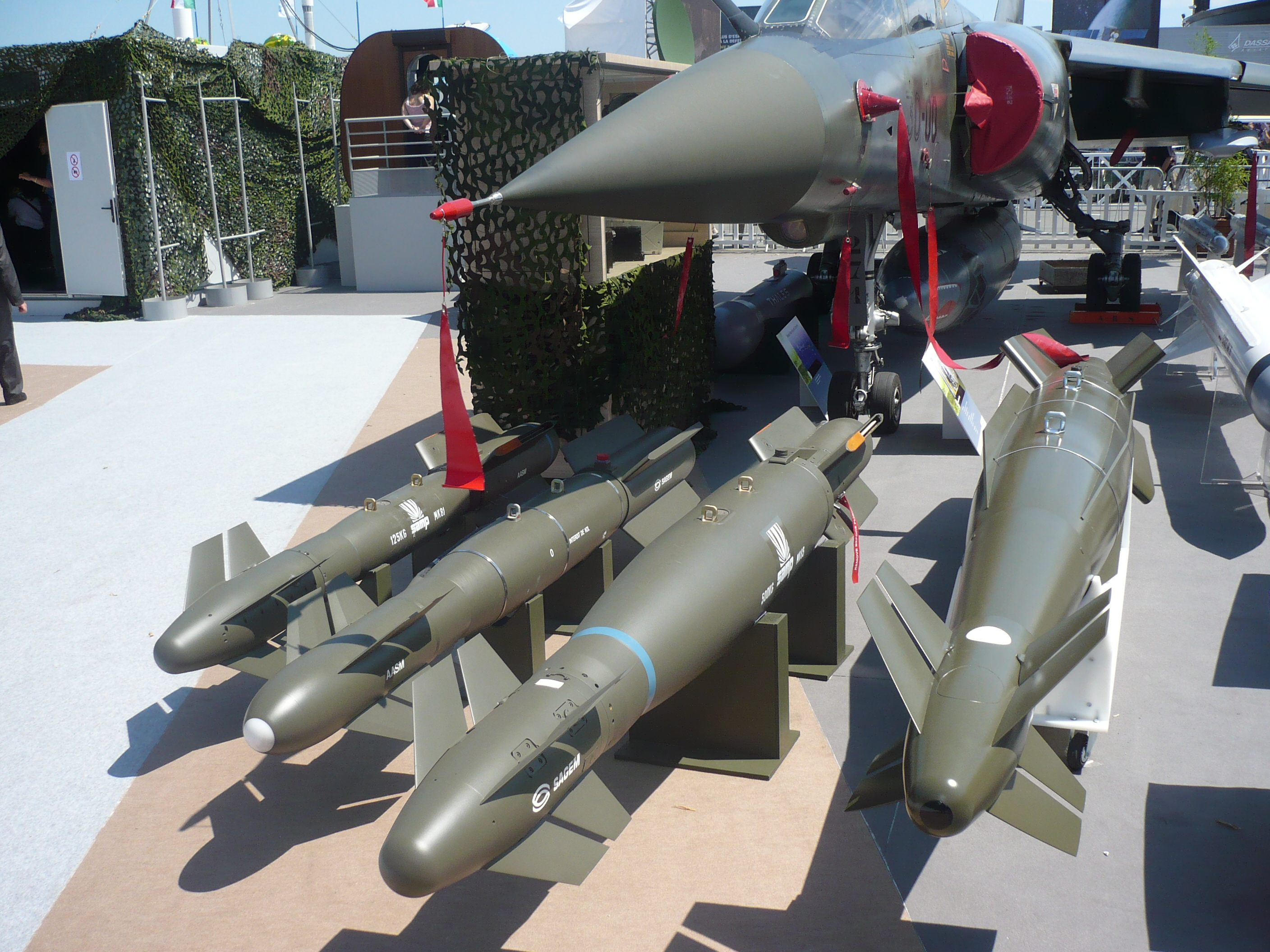
Assorted 125kg, 250kg, 500kg, and 1000kg bombs besides a Mirage F1

Data from Jane's All The World's Aircraft 1988–89,

General characteristics

- Crew: 1
- Length: 15.3 m (50 ft 2 in)
- Wingspan: 8.4 m (27 ft 7 in)
- Height: 4.5 m (14 ft 9 in)
- Wing area: 25 m^{2} (270 sq ft)
- Empty weight: 7,400 kg (16,314 lb)
- Gross weight: 10,900 kg (24,030 lb) (clean take-off weight)
- Max takeoff weight: 16,200 kg (35,715 lb)
- Powerplant: 1 × SNECMA Atar 9K-50 afterburning turbojet engine, 49.03 kN (11,020 lbf) thrust dry, 70.6 kN (15,900 lbf) with afterburner

Performance

- Maximum speed: 2,338 km/h (1,453 mph, 1,262 kn) at 11,000 m (36,000 ft)
- Maximum speed: Mach 2.2
- Combat range: 425 km (264 mi, 229 nmi) hi-lo-hi at Mach 0.75/0.88 with 14 × 250 kg (551 lb) bombs
- Ferry range: 3,300 km (2,100 mi, 1,800 nmi) with maximum external fuel
- Endurance: 2 hr 15 min (combat air patrol, with 2 × Super 530 missiles and centreline drop tank)
- Service ceiling: 20,000 m (66,000 ft)
- Rate of climb: 243 m/s (47,800 ft/min)
- Thrust/weight: 0.66

Armament

- Guns: 2× 30 mm (1.18 in) DEFA 553 cannons with 150 rounds per gun
- Hardpoints: 1 centreline pylon, four underwing and two wingtip pylons with a capacity of 6,300 kg (13,900 lb) (practical maximum load 4,000 kg (8,800 lb)), with provisions to carry combinations of:
  - Rockets: 8× Matra rocket pods with 18× SNEB 68 mm rockets each
  - Bombs: various
  - Other: reconnaissance pods or Drop tanks
- Missiles: 2× AIM-9 Sidewinders OR Matra R550 Magics on wingtip pylons, 2× R.530 or Super 530Fs underwing, 1× AM-39 Exocet anti-ship missile, 2× AS-30L laser-guided missiles

== See also ==
Related development

- Dassault Mirage III
- Dassault Mirage F2
- Dassault Mirage G
- Dassault Mirage 2000

Aircraft of comparable role, configuration, and era

- Mikoyan-Gurevich MiG-23
- Northrop F-5E/F Tiger-II
- SEPECAT Jaguar

Related lists

- List of fighter aircraft
- List of military aircraft of France
