= Flying Scholarships for Disabled People =

UK charity

Flying Scholarships for Disabled People (FSDP)
- Abbreviation: FSDP
- Formation: 1983
- Founder: Tim Prince Paul Bowen
- Legal status: Charity
- Purpose: To inspire disabled adults, building their confidence, self-esteem and future aspirations through the sharing of life changing aviation experiences.
- Headquarters: Fairford, Gloucestershire
- Website: fsdp.co.uk

Flying Scholarships for Disabled People (FSDP) is a UK charity based at RAF Fairford in Gloucestershire, dedicated to helping disabled people to learn to fly a light aircraft.

The stated purpose is to inspire disabled adults, building their confidence, self-esteem and aspirations through the sharing of life changing aviation experiences.

The charity was founded in 1983 by Tim Prince and Paul Bowen of the Royal International Air Tattoo in the memory of Group Captain Sir Douglas Bader, the disabled wartime fighter ace who lost both his legs in an accident in 1931.

Over 400 disabled people have participated in the scholarship scheme, several are paraplegic, and others are disabled as a result, for example, of cerebral palsy, loss of limbs, rheumatoid arthritis, MS, ME, spina bifida and poliomyelitis.

Supported by donations and sponsorship, the charity typically provides about 12 scholarships a year. Many of the Scholars get to fly Solo, and some go on to take full licences.

== Patronage ==
Up until his death in 1999, the Patron of the charity was His Royal Highness King Hussein of the Hashemite Kingdom of Jordan. Following the death of his father, his son His Royal Highness Prince Faisal bin Al Hussein, succeeded him and is the current patron of the charity.

Air Chief Marshall Sir Stephen Dalton joined the charity as a Vice Patron in 2012.

Author, broadcaster, pilot and musician Bruce Dickinson, best known as a member of Iron Maiden, was appointed Vice Patron of the charity in 2012.

Tim Prince OBE, joint founder of the Royal International Air Tattoo "the world’s largest military air show", and the FSDP charity, is a Vice Patron of the charity.

Polly Vacher MBE, is an aviator specialising in long-distance solo flights, having obtained her private pilot license in Australia in 1994. She was awarded her MBE in 2002 for her services to charity, and was appointed a Vice Patron to the charity in 2015.

== Scholar Stories ==
Since achieving his scholarship in 2007 Andy Lewis MBE has become part of the Great Britain World Class Performance Program competing for Great Britain all over the world. He is the British Elite Champion for Paraduathlon and British Champion for Triathlon. He was awarded the Sports person of the year in the Pride of the Forest awards and disabled sports performer of the year in the Bristol Sports awards. He is a GB Paratriathlete and competes as a through-knee amputee and achieved a gold medal at the 2016 Rio Paralympic Games. In December 2016 he was awarded an MBE for services to triathlon.
