= Polly Vacher =

English aviator (born 1944)

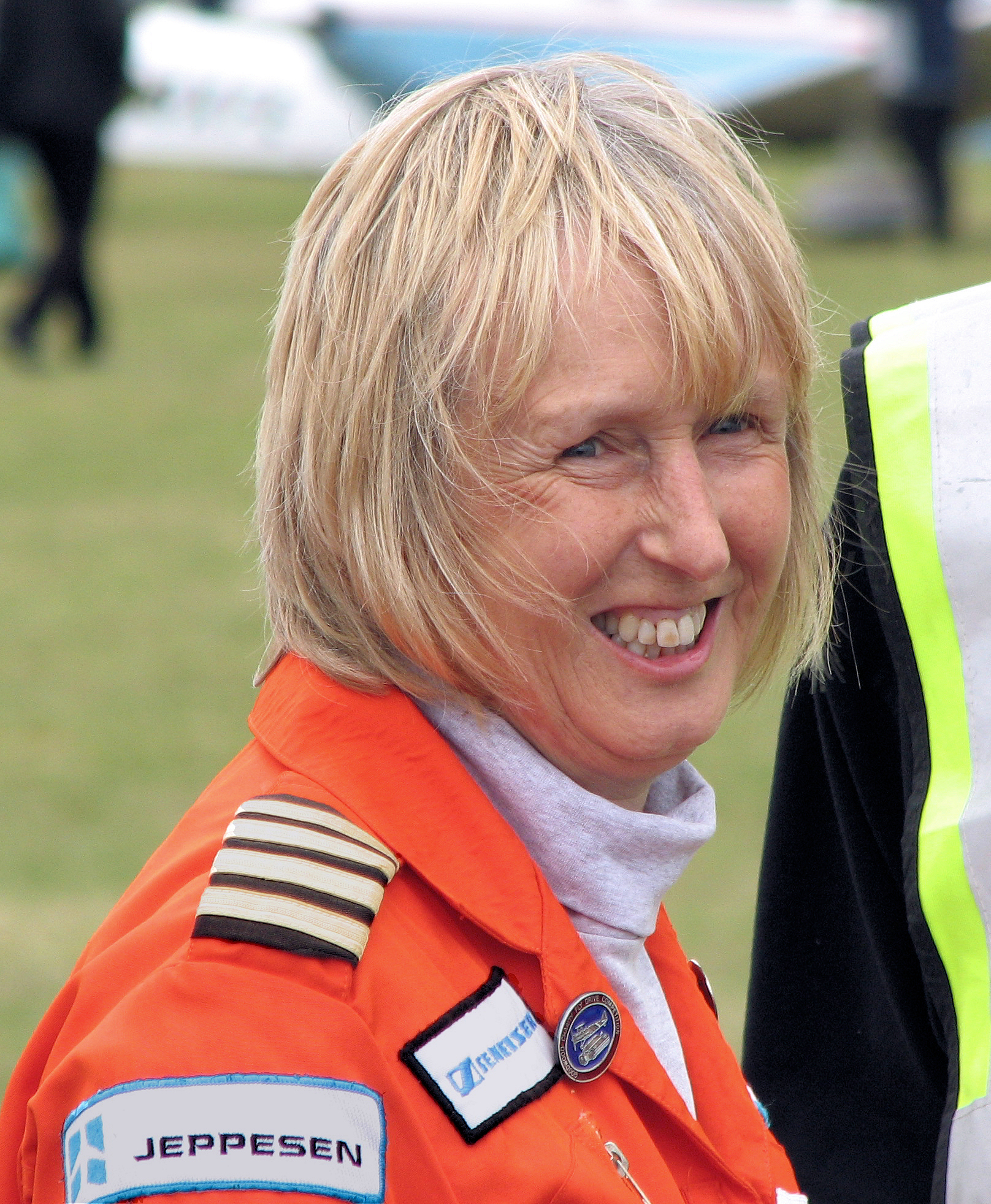
Polly Vacher

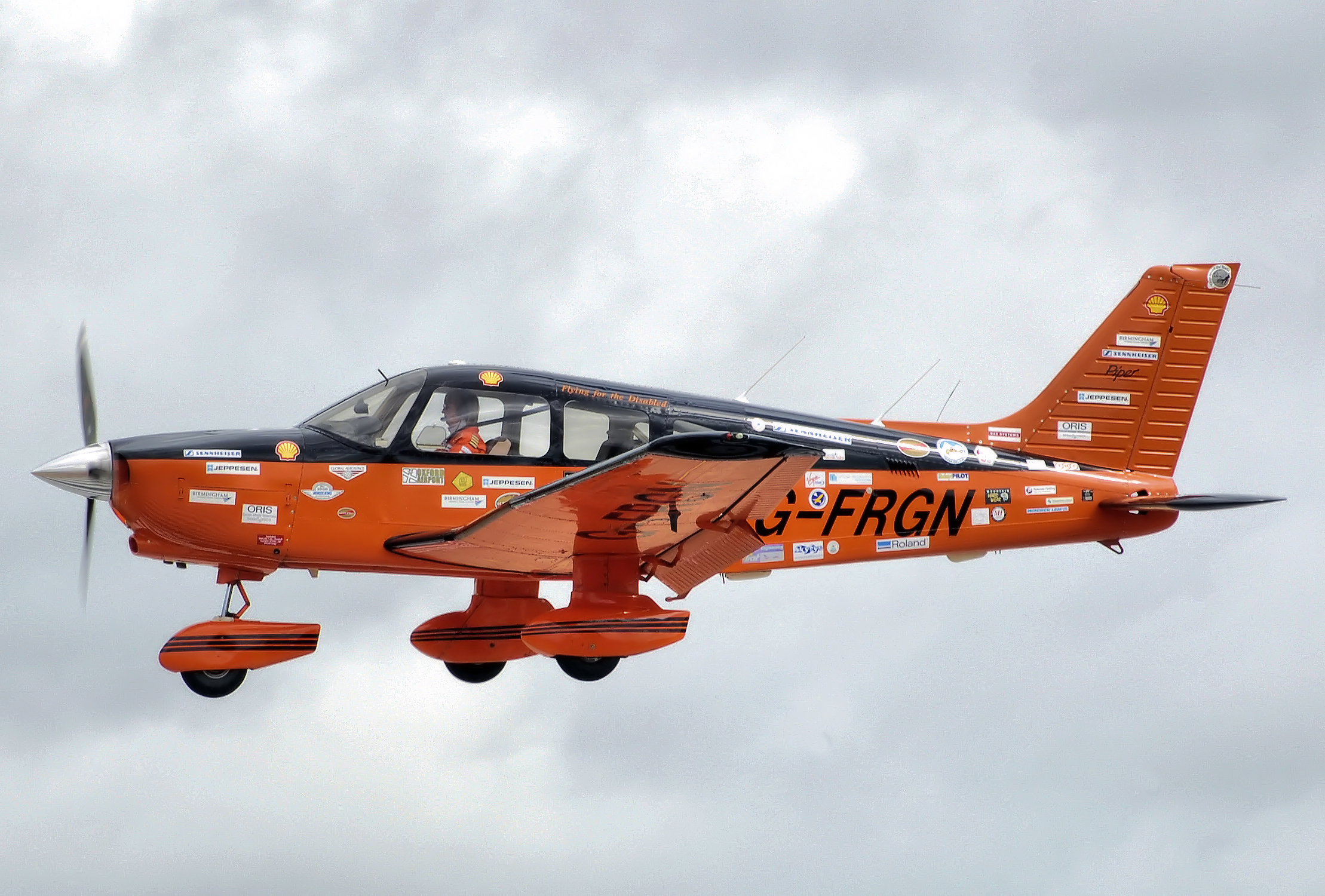
Polly Vacher arriving at RIAT 2008 in her Piper PA-28 Dakota

Polly Vacher MBE (born 1944) is an English aviator specialising in long-distance solo flights. She was awarded the MBE for services to charity in 2002. She lives in Oxfordshire.

Born in south Devon, she trained in physiotherapy and spent twenty years in music education. Her interest in aviation developed from a charity skydiving event. She obtained her private pilot licence with her husband Peter in Australia in 1994 and they followed this up by a circumnavigation of the continent. In 1997 she toured the United States by plane, flying solo across the North Atlantic in both directions.

Her first Wings Around the World Challenge in aid of the charity Flying Scholarships for the Disabled was in January–May 2001 when she made a solo eastbound circumnavigation of the world in her single-engine Piper PA-28 Cherokee Dakota G-FRGN, the smallest aircraft flown solo by a woman around the world via Australia, including a 16-hour segment from Hawaii to California.

On 6 May 2003 she set out from Birmingham Airport on a Voyage to the Ice for the same charity, flying over the North Pole, Antarctica and all seven continents, returning on 27 April 2004, becoming the first solo woman flyer over the polar regions.

On 21 May 2007 she set off from Birmingham Airport on her Wings Around Britain Challenge in which she landed at all the airfields in the Jeppesen VFR Manual, between 21 May and 31 July 2007. 221 airfields were visited, flying 19,000 nautical miles (35,000 km) in 158 flying hours. Ninety-six disabled passengers were flown on legs of the flight.
