= Mykola Koval =

Mykola Koval may refer to:

- Mykola Koval (operatic baritone) (born 1952), Ukrainian operatic baritone
- Mykola Koval (pilot) (born 1952), Ukrainian fighter pilot
