= Orzhiv =

Rural locality in Rivne Oblast, Ukraine

Orzhiv Оржів
- Rural settlement
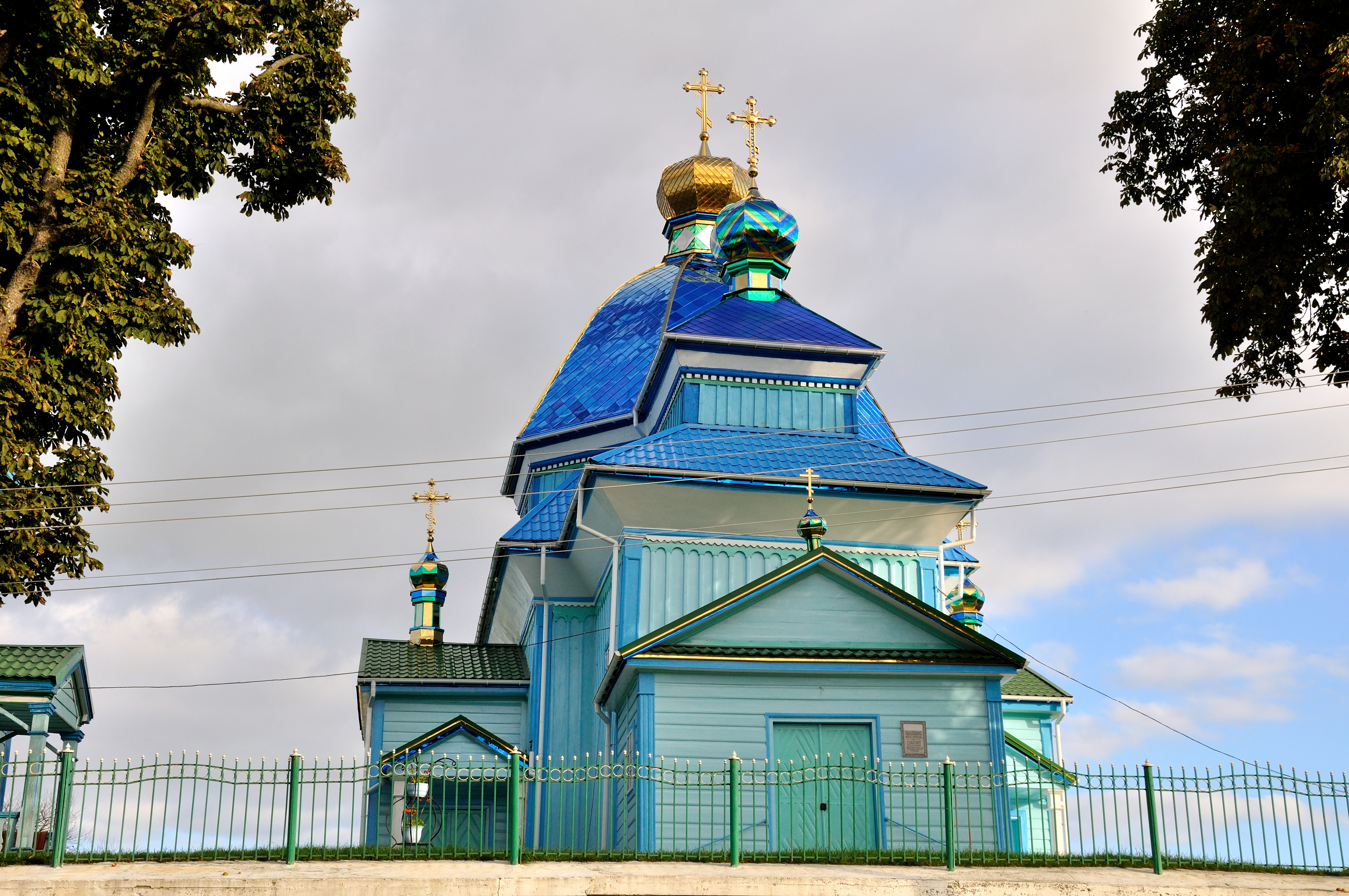
- Transfiguration church

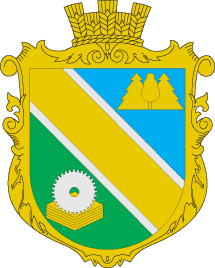
- Flag Coat of arms

- Location of Orzhiv in Ukraine Orzhiv (Ukraine)
- Coordinates: 50°45′04″N 26°07′07″E
- Country: Ukraine
- Oblast: Rivne Oblast
- Raion: Rivne Raion
- Hromada: Klevan settlement hromada
- Founded: 1445
- Town status: 1959

Government
  - Town Head: Yuriy Bobrovnik

Area
  - Total: 8.95 km^{2} (3.46 sq mi)
- Elevation: 176 m (577 ft)

Population (2001)
  - Total: 4,230
  - Density: 473/km^{2} (1,220/sq mi)
- Time zone: UTC+2 (EET)
  - Summer (DST): UTC+3 (EEST)
- Postal code: 35313
- Area code: +380 362
- Website: http://rada.gov.ua/

Orzhiv (Ukrainian: Оржів) is a rural settlement in Rivne Raion (district) of Rivne Oblast (province) in western Ukraine. Its population was 4,230 as of the 2001 Ukrainian Census. Current population: 3,853 (2022 estimate).

== History ==
Orzhiv was first founded in the beginning of the 16th century, and it acquired the status of an urban-type settlement in 1959. On 26 January 2024, a new law entered into force which abolished this status, and Orzhiv became a rural settlement.

== Geography ==
The town is 20 km northwest of Rivne, 61 km east of Lutsk. It counts a railway station on the Rivne-Kovel line, and is also the eastern terminus of the "Tunnel of Love", an amusement railway linking it to Klevan, surrounded by green arches.

== See also ==
- Klevan and Kvasyliv, the other two urban-type settlements in Rivne Raion of Rivne Oblast
