= Rivne urban hromada =

Urban hromada in Rivne Oblast, Ukraine

Rivne urban hromada Рівненська міська громада
- Hromada
- Seal

- Location within Rivne Oblast Location within Ukraine
- Coordinates: 50°37′09″N 26°15′07″E
- Country: Ukraine
- Oblast (province): Rivne Oblast
- Raion (district): Rivne Raion

Area
  - Total: 62.7 km^{2} (24.2 sq mi)

Population (2022)
  - Total: 251,948

Rivne urban territorial hromada (Ukrainian: Рівненська міська територіальна громада, romanized: Rivnenska miska terytorialna hromada) is a hromada (municipality) located in Western Ukraine's Rivne Oblast. The hromada's capital is the city of Rivne.

The most recent population estimate was 251,948 (2022 estimate) The area of the hromada is 62.7 square kilometres (24.2 mi^{2}).

== Settlements ==
The Rivne urban hromada only consists of two settlements; its capital, Rivne, and the rural settlement of Kvasyliv.

== History ==
The Rivne urban hromada has adopted a strategy for the development of the hromada until 2027, including strengthening the role of residents in local government, expansion of small businesses, improvements to education, infrastructure, and healthcare, and development of the green and tourist economy.

In 2022, the Rivne urban hromada had the highest revenue from small business taxes among the hromadas of Rivne Oblast, bringing in ₴82.3 million.

== See also ==
- List of hromadas of Ukraine
