= Tunnel of Love (railway) =

Section of industrial railway in Ukraine

Coordinates: 50.7509°N 26.0461°E

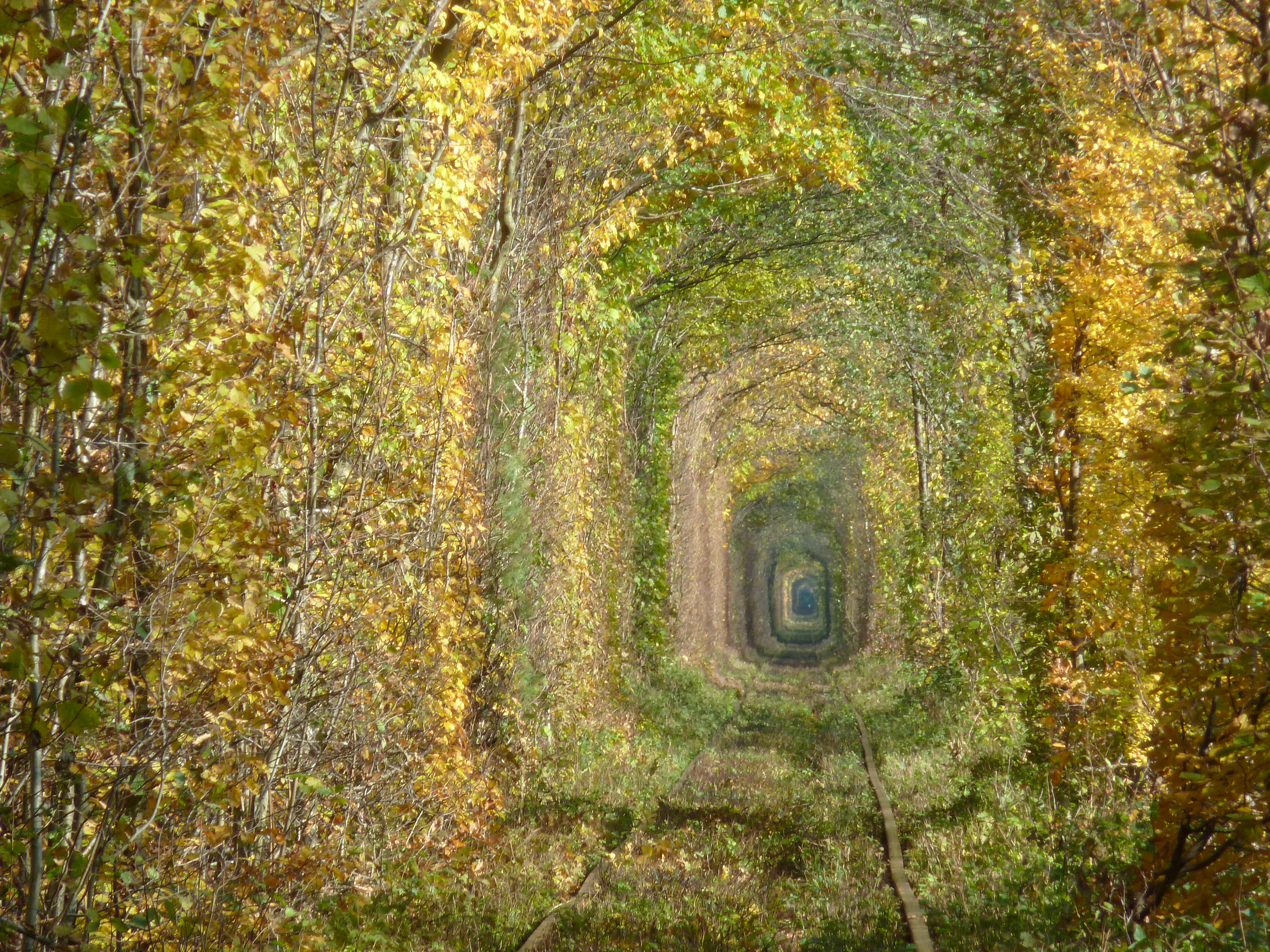
- Tunnel of Love near Klevan

Overview
- Native name: Тунель Кохання
- Locale: Klevan, Ukraine
- Termini: Klevan; Orzhiv

Service
- Type: Railway
- Operator: Ukrainian Railways (UZ)

Technical
- Line length: 5 km (3.1 mi) (Note: Length referred to the whole line)
- Number of tracks: Single track
- Track gauge: 1,520 mm (4 ft 11 27/32 in)

The Tunnel of Love (Ukrainian: Тунель Кохання, romanized: Tunel Kokhannia) is a section of industrial railway located near Klevan, Rivne Oblast, Ukraine, that links it with Orzhiv. It is a railway surrounded by green arches and is three to five kilometers in length. It is known for being a favorite place for couples to take walks since trains pass only three times a day.

== Route ==
The line starts at Klevan station, on the Kovel-Rivne line, and reaches a fibreboard factory in the northern area of Orzhiv, also served by a station on the main line. The whole line is about 6.4 km long., (Note: Cumulated length of OSM ways 349575892, 416369692, 183417953, 349575891) and about 4.9 km (Note: Length of OSM way 183417953) is covered by forest, within which this tunnel stretches anywhere from 3 to 4.9 km, depending on how individuals measure it.

== Gallery ==
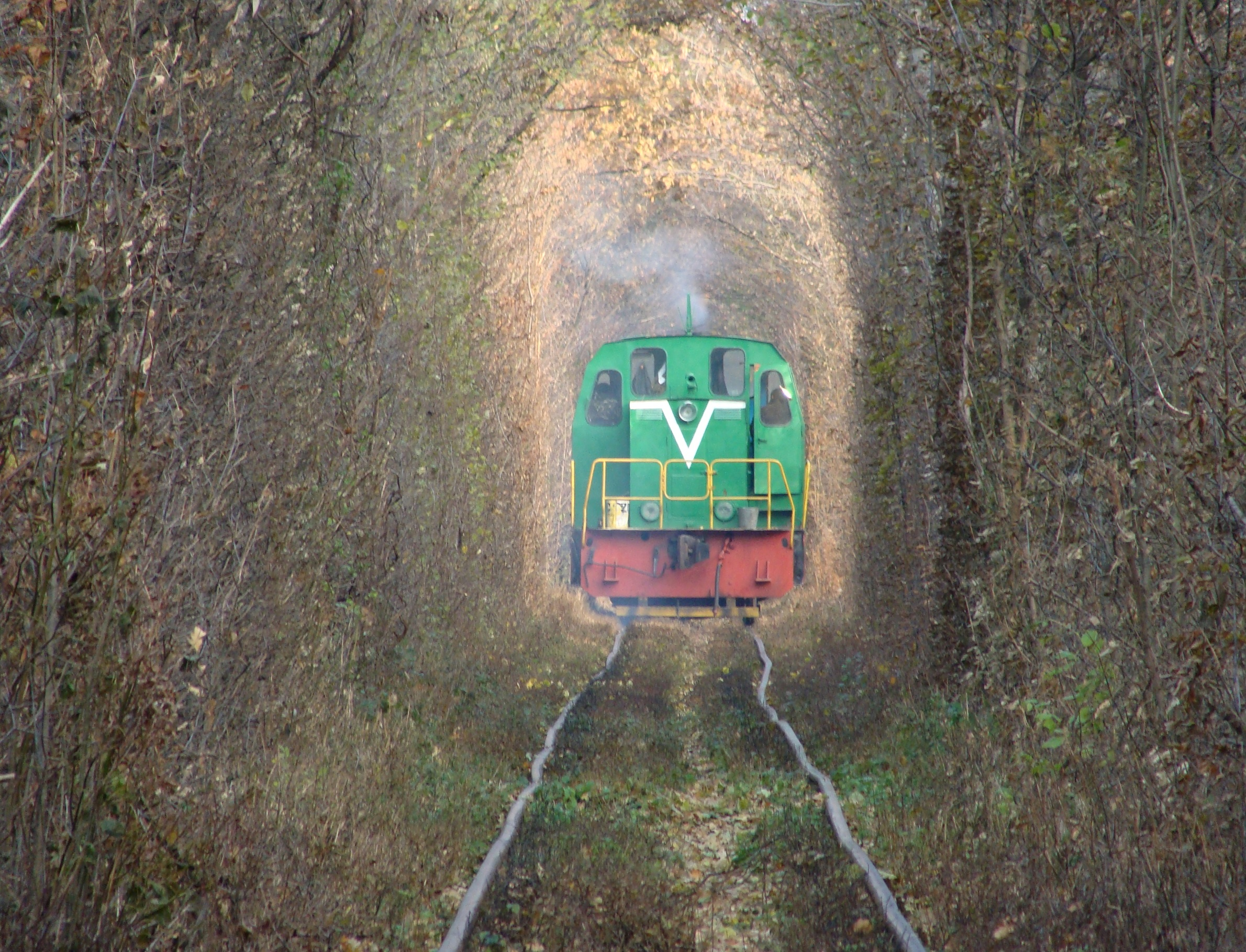
A train passing through the tunnel (1)

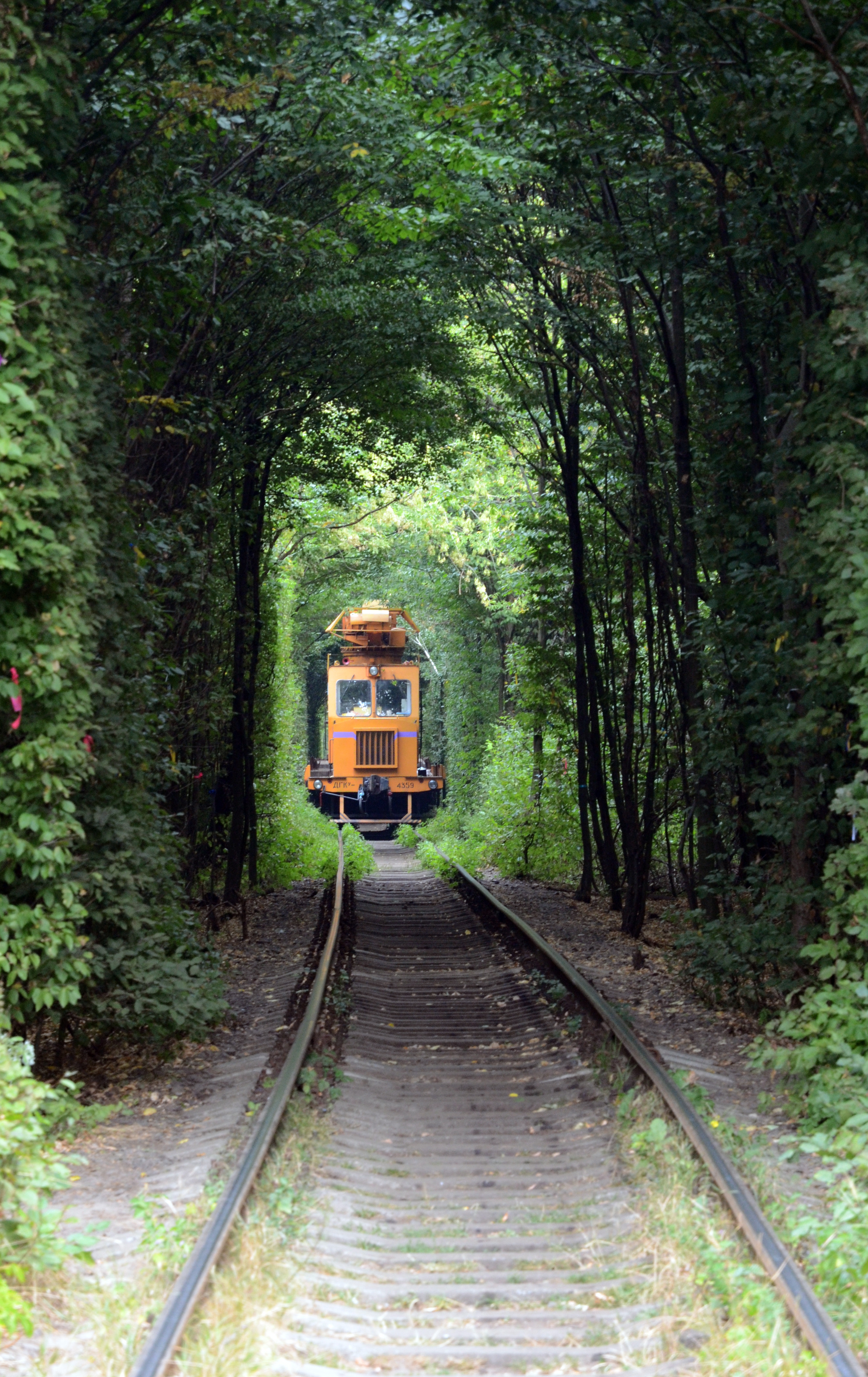
A train passing through the tunnel (2)

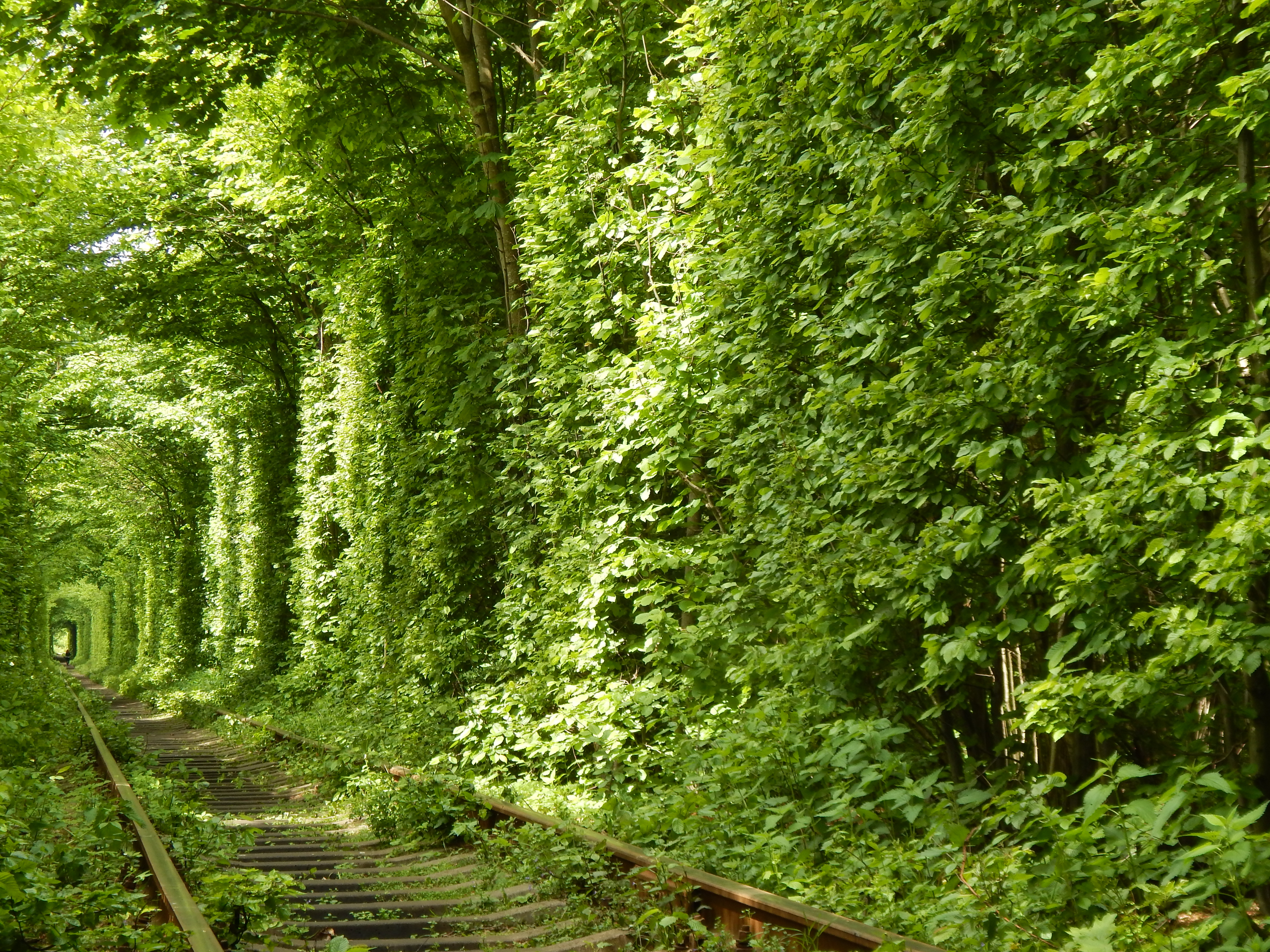
View of the tunnel (1)

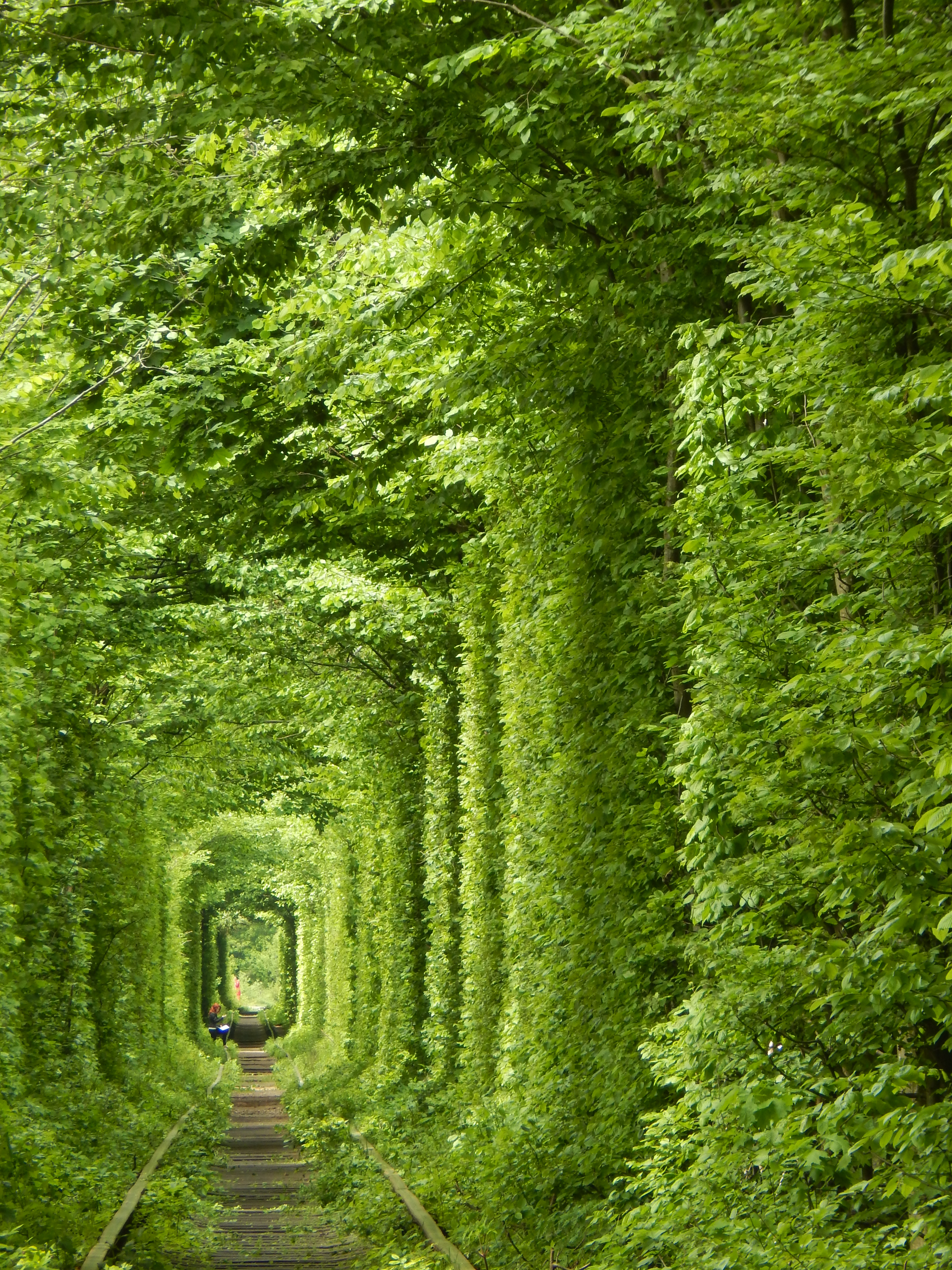
View of the tunnel (2)

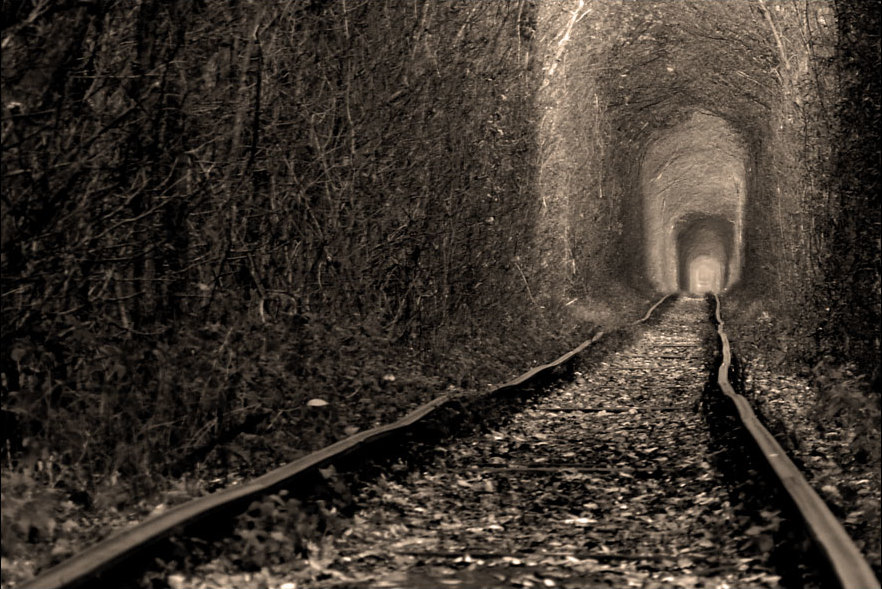
View of the tunnel (3)

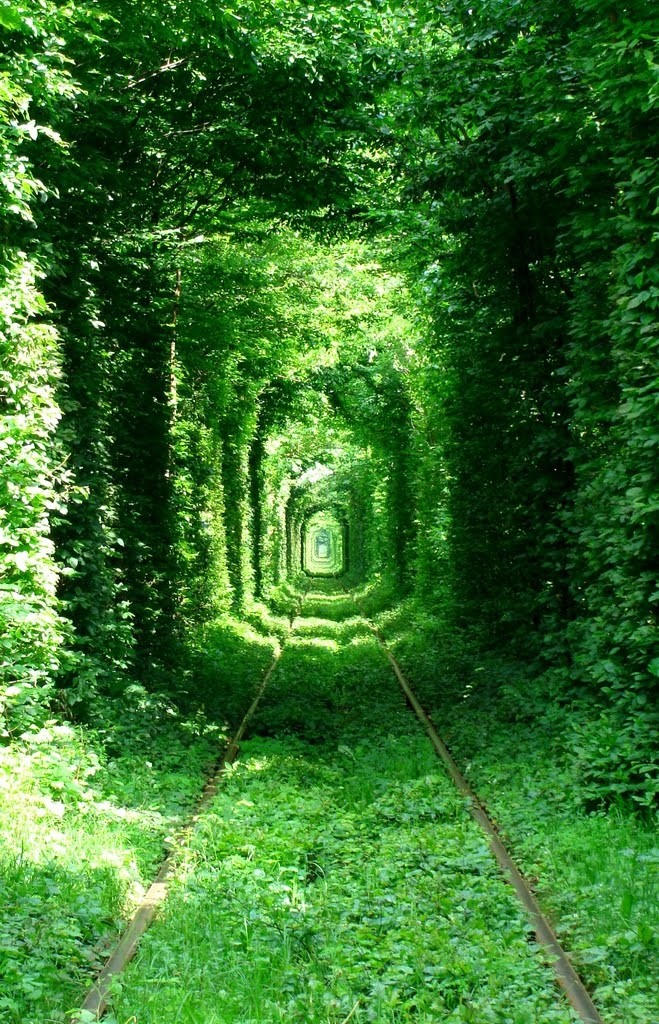
View of the tunnel (4)

== Literature ==
- Ristuccia, Marco; Roth, Christine (2018). In the Tunnel of Love: images of Ukraine today (Hardcover). Berlin: The Light Beam Publishing. p. 124. ISBN 978-3-947714-06-3.
- Ristuccia, Marco; Roth, Christine (2018). In the Tunnel of Love: images of Ukraine today (Softcover). Berlin: The Light Beam Publishing. p. 124. ISBN 978-3-947714-07-0.
- Ristuccia, Marco; Roth, Christine (2018). In the Tunnel of Love: images of Ukraine today (eBook). Berlin: The Light Beam Publishing. p. 124. ISBN 978-3-947714-08-7.
