= Kvasyliv =

Rural locality in Rivne Oblast, Ukraine

Kvasyliv Квасилів
- Rural settlement
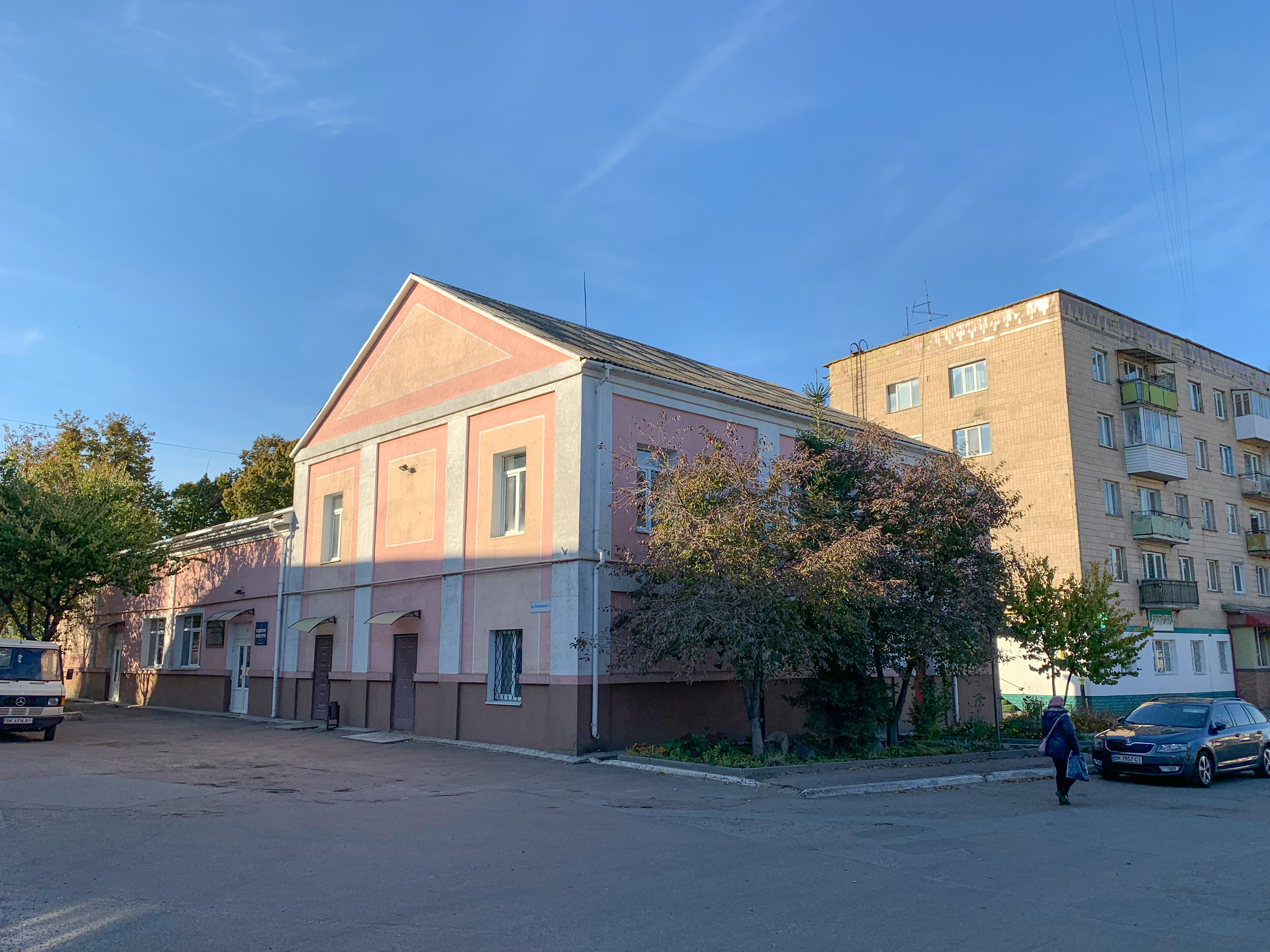
- House of culture in Kvasyliv

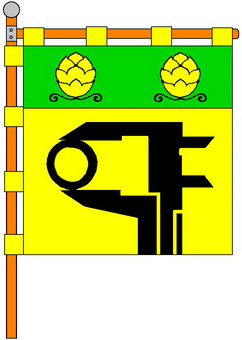
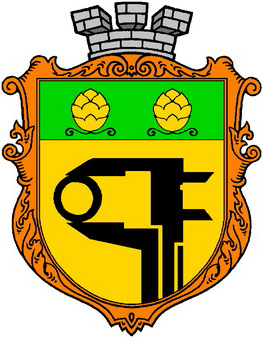
- Flag Coat of arms

- Location of Kvasyliv in Ukraine Kvasyliv (Ukraine)
- Coordinates: 50°33′25″N 26°16′03″E
- Country: Ukraine
- Oblast: Rivne Oblast
- Raion: Rivne Raion
- Hromada: Rivne urban hromada
- First mentioned: 1445
- Urban-type settlement status: 1959

Government
  - Town Head: Dmytro Kret

Area
  - Total: 4.46 km^{2} (1.72 sq mi)
- Elevation: 190 m (620 ft)

Population (2022)
  - Total: 8,075
  - Density: 1,810/km^{2} (4,690/sq mi)
- Time zone: UTC+2 (EET)
  - Summer (DST): UTC+3 (EEST)
- Postal code: 35350
- Area code: +380 362
- Website: http://rada.gov.ua/

Kvasyliv (Ukrainian: Квасилів; Polish: Kwasiłów) is a rural settlement in Rivne Raion (district) of Rivne Oblast (province) in western Ukraine. Population: 8,075 (2022 estimate) It is located in the historic region of Volhynia.

== History ==
The settlement was first mentioned in 1445. In 1496, it was raided by the Tatars. In 1569 it passed from Lithuania to Poland within the Polish–Lithuanian Commonwealth. It was administratively located in the Volhynian Voivodeship in the Lesser Poland Province.

The settlement was annexed by Russia in the Partitions of Poland. Czech immigrants settled in the village in the 19th century. Local possessions of the Radziwiłł family were purchased by the Czechs, who developed hops production and founded a brewery in Kvasyliv. A local Czech branch of the Sokol movement was founded in the settlement in 1911, which formed part of the Polish Sokół movement.

Following World War I, Kwasiłów, as it was known in Polish, became again part of Poland, within which it was administratively located in the Równe County in the Wołyń Voivodeship. It was one of the main centers of the Czech minority in Poland. An honorary consulate of Czechoslovakia was located in Kwasiłów in the 1930s, and a Czech language newspaper Hlas Volyně was published in the settlement. Following the joint German-Soviet invasion of Poland, which started World War II in September 1939, the village was occupied by the Soviet Union until 1941, then by Germany until 1944, and then re-occupied by the Soviet Union, which eventually annexed it from Poland in 1945. Most Czechs were deported from Kvasyliv under the Soviet rule with two large waves of expulsion taking place in 1940 and 1947.

In 1959, it acquired the status of an urban-type settlement.

Until 26 January 2024, Kvasyliv was designated urban-type settlement. On this day, a new law entered into force which abolished this status, and Kvasyliv became a rural settlement.

== People ==
- Mykola Koval (born 1952), Ukrainian fighter pilot-ace

== See also ==
- Klevan, Orzhiv, the other two urban-type settlements in Rivne Raion of Rivne Oblast
- Czechs in Ukraine
