= Klevan Castle =

Ukrainian fort

Coordinates: 50°44′32″N 25°58′00″E

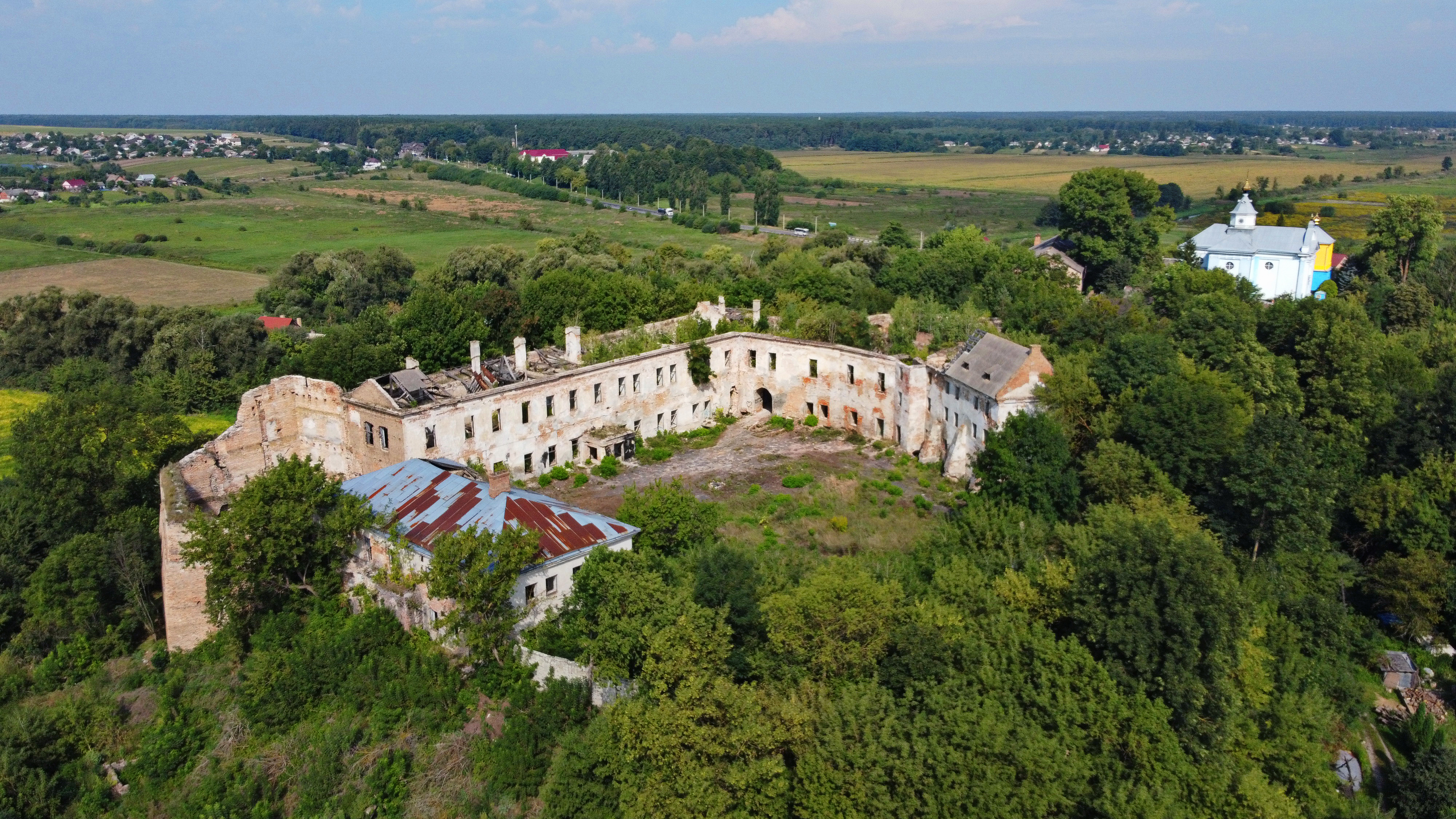
- Aerial view, 2023

Immovable Monument of National Significance of Ukraine
- Official name: Замок (Castle)
- Type: Architecture
- Reference no.: 170054

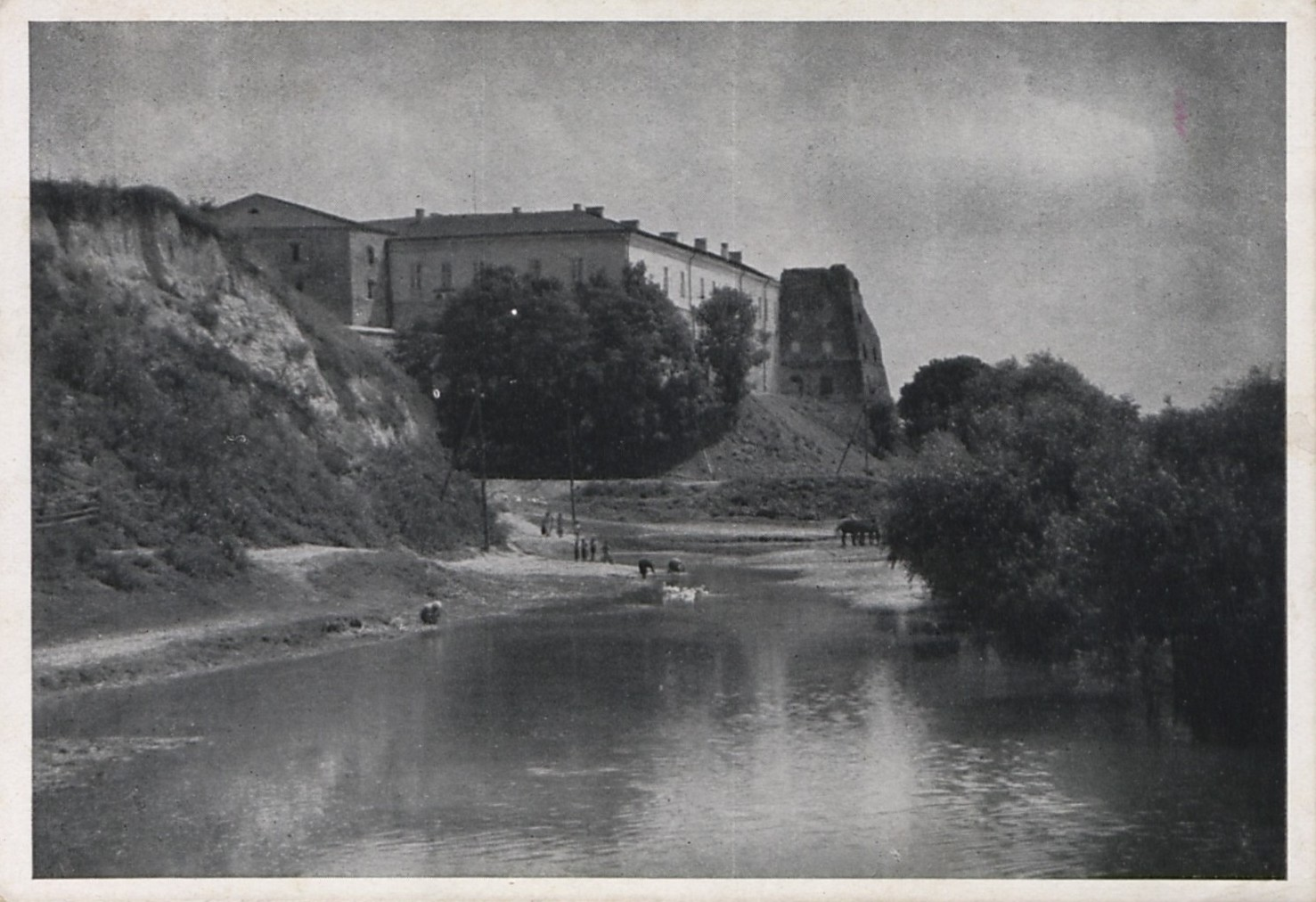
Klevan Castle in Volhynia

Klevan Castle (Ukrainian: Клеванський замок) is one of the oldest forts in Volynia, Ukraine. It was built in the mid-15th century by Prince Michael Czartoryski in order to control a ford over the Stubla River. Klevan was the main seat of the Orthodox princely house of Chortoryisk until its members converted to Catholicism in the 17th century. After that the castle was given to a Jesuit school. After the partitions of Poland the castle was confiscated by the Habsburgs, and stood untenanted. Its western wall was pulled down in the 19th century. The remaining portions include two towers, three fortified buildings, and a high four-arched bridge leading to the main gate.

== History ==
A description of the castle from 1605 has been preserved. The main protective role was played by the western tower, fortified with a stone bastion. The eastern tower served as a Zeichhaus (arsenal). The castle quickly lost its defensive function, and in 1632 the building was given to the Jesuits, who set up their college here. Probably, they were the owners of the castle until the end of the 18th century. Thus, the castle was not a magnate's residence with a palace, like Korets Castle.

After the first partition of the Polish-Lithuanian Commonwealth, the lands were ceded to the Habsburg monarchy (since 1804 to the Austrian Empire). By order of Emperor Joseph II, the Jesuits' property was confiscated in 1773. After the subsequent partitions of the Polish-Lithuanian Commonwealth, the territory was ceded to Russia. At the turn of the 18th and 19th centuries, the castle stood empty.

In 1817, the eastern wall of the castle was dismantled. The building materials were used to construct two wings intended for a Polish gymnasium.

In the period 1817-1831 it was used as a Polish gymnasium, which was liquidated by the tsarist regime after the Polish national liberation uprising. The slow destruction of the castle buildings continued during the tragic events of the 20th century.
