= Tree tunnel =

Foliage corridor

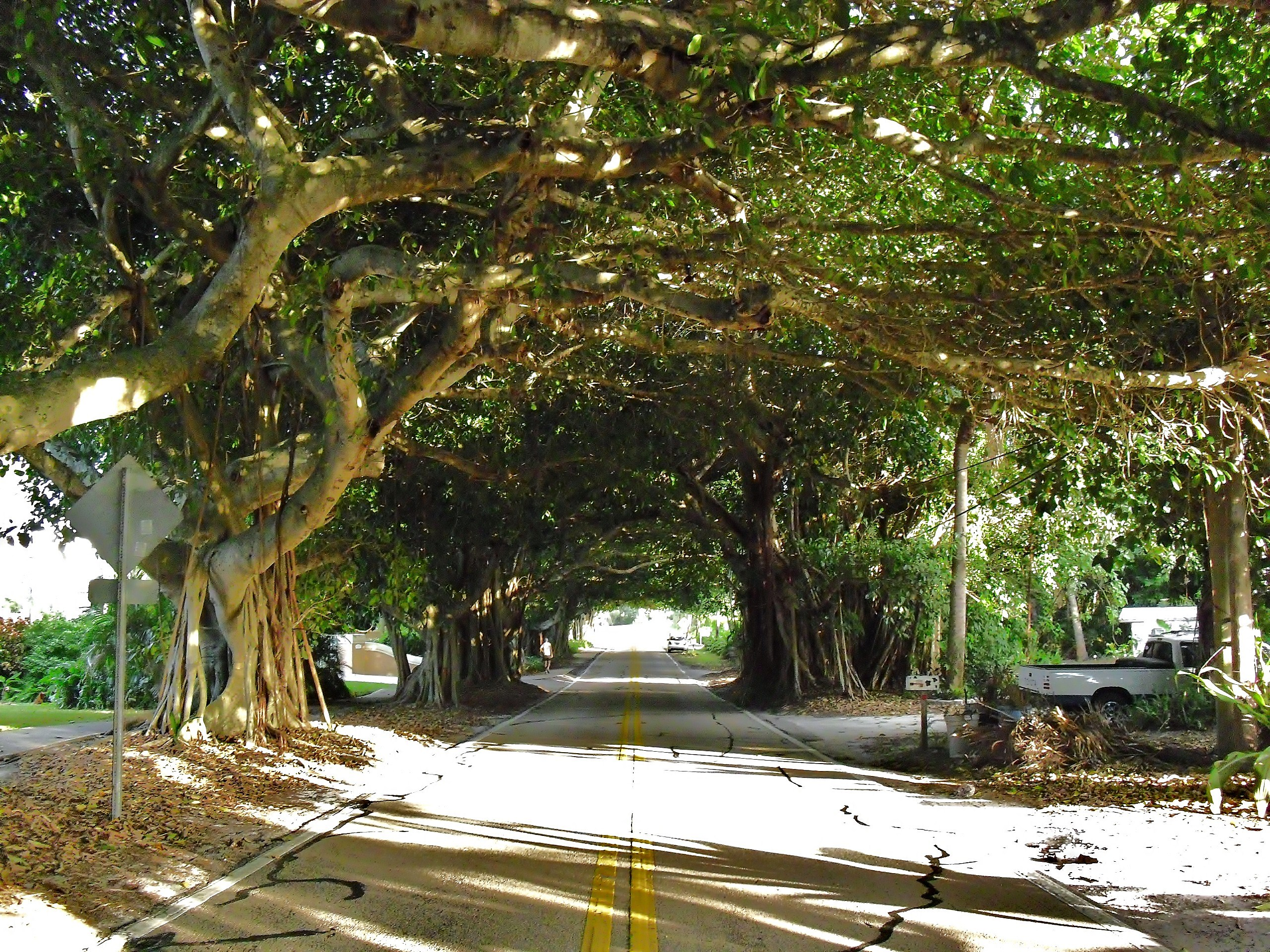
Trees over a street in Coral Gables, Florida

A tree tunnel is a road, lane or track where the trees on each side form a more or less continuous canopy overhead, giving the effect of a tunnel.

The effect may be achieved in a formal avenue lined with trees or in a more rural setting with randomly placed trees on each side of the route.

The British artist David Hockney has painted tree tunnels as a theme, as especially illustrated at a 2012 solo exhibition of his work at the Royal Academy in London, England. The English landscape artist Nick Schlee has used tree tunnels as subject matter.

== Gallery ==
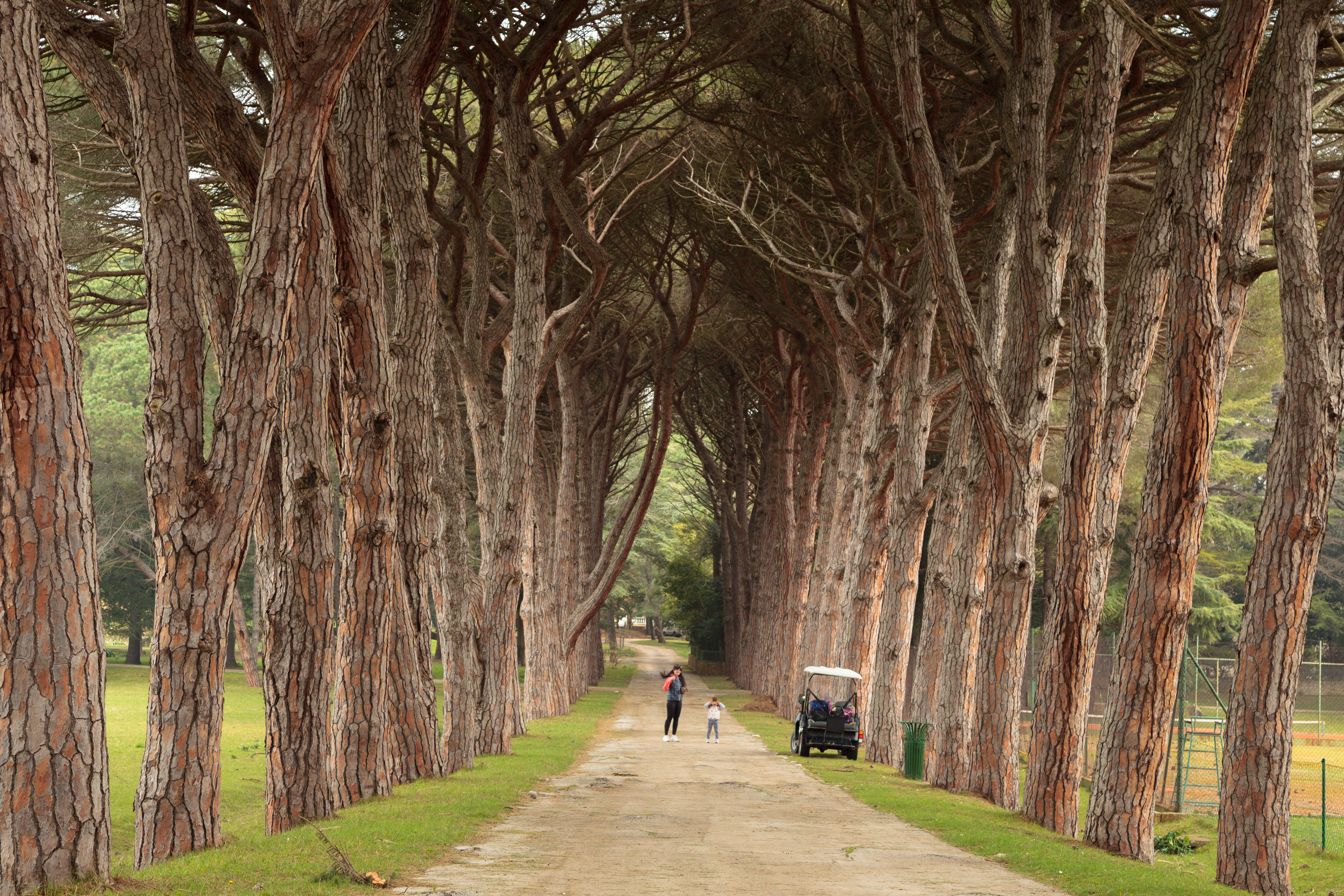
Brijuni Islands, Istria County, Croatia

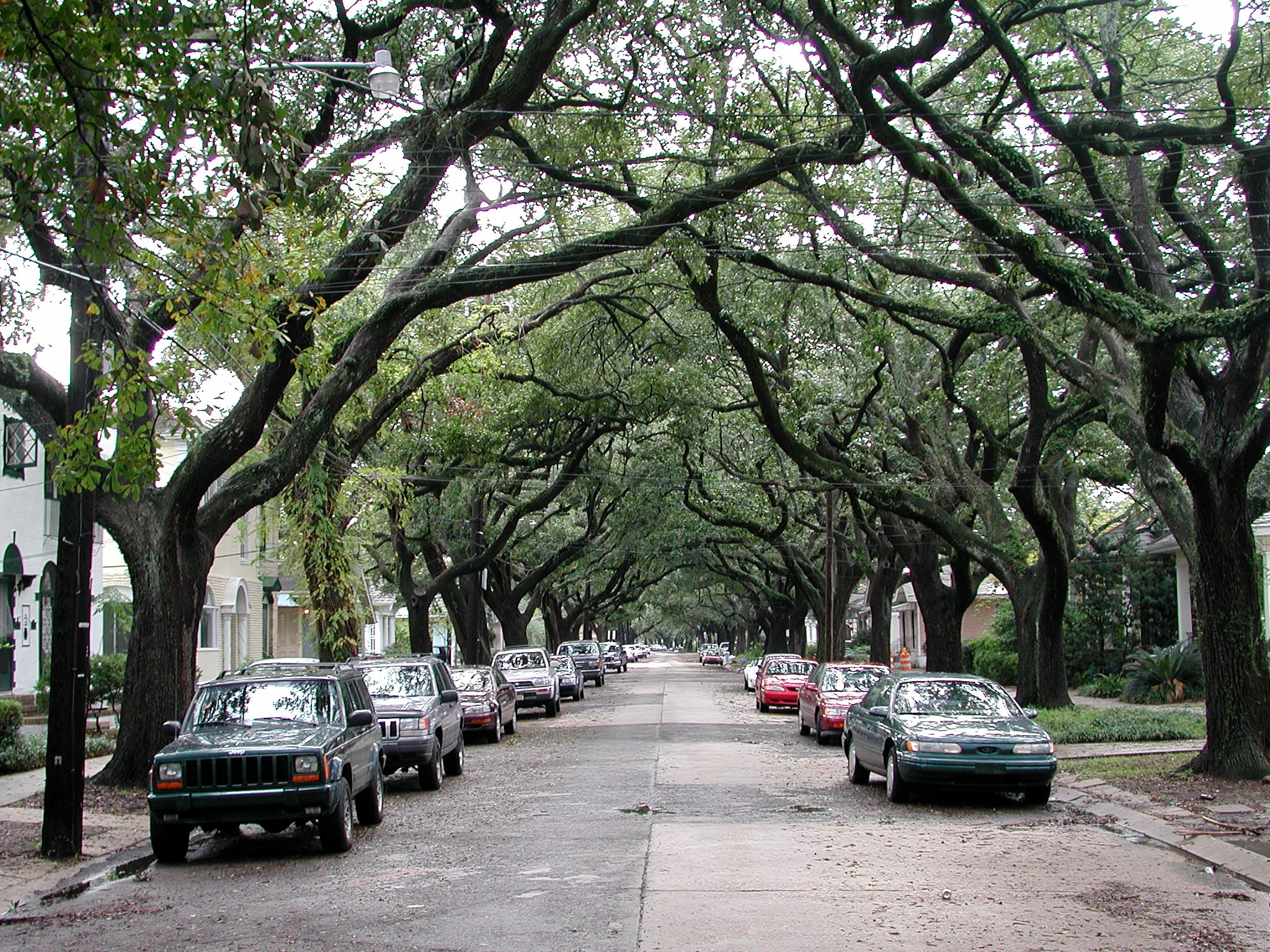
New Orleans street, November 2000

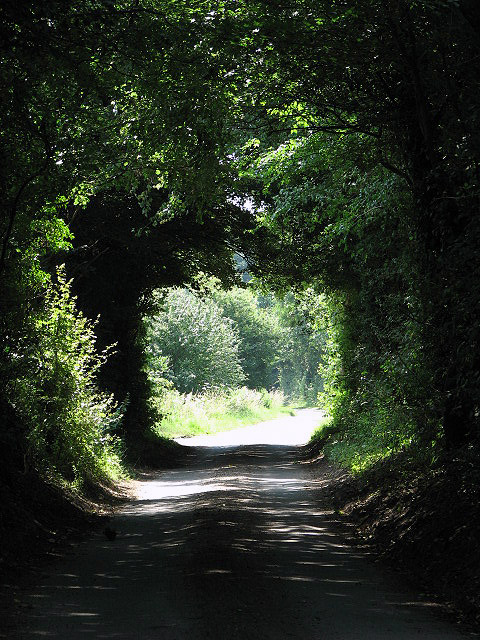
Rural tree tunnel, Norfolk, UK

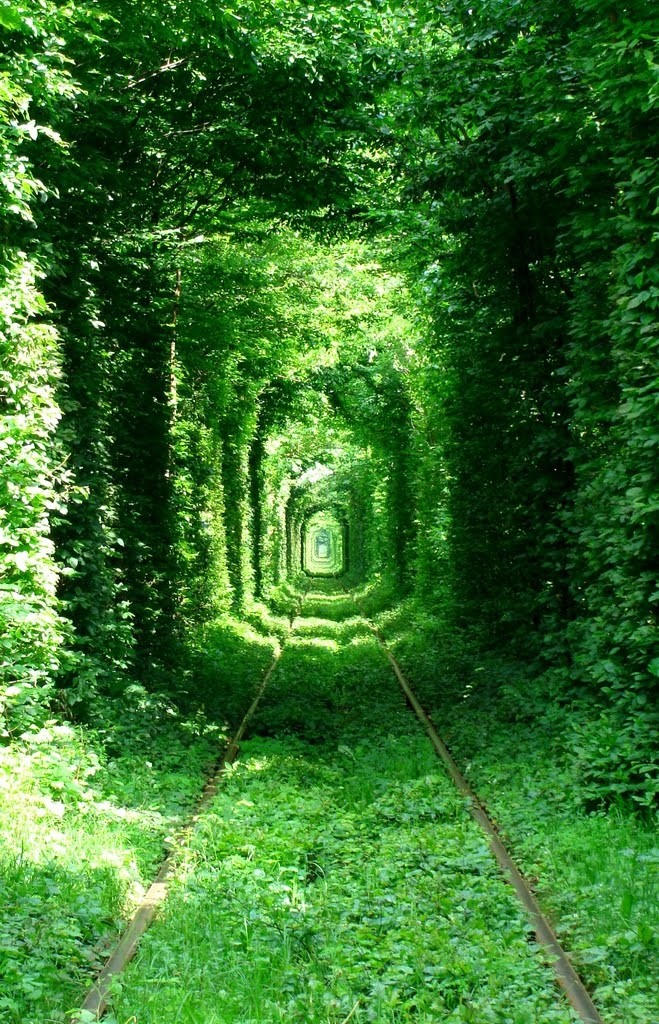
Tunnel of Love, Klevan, Ukraine

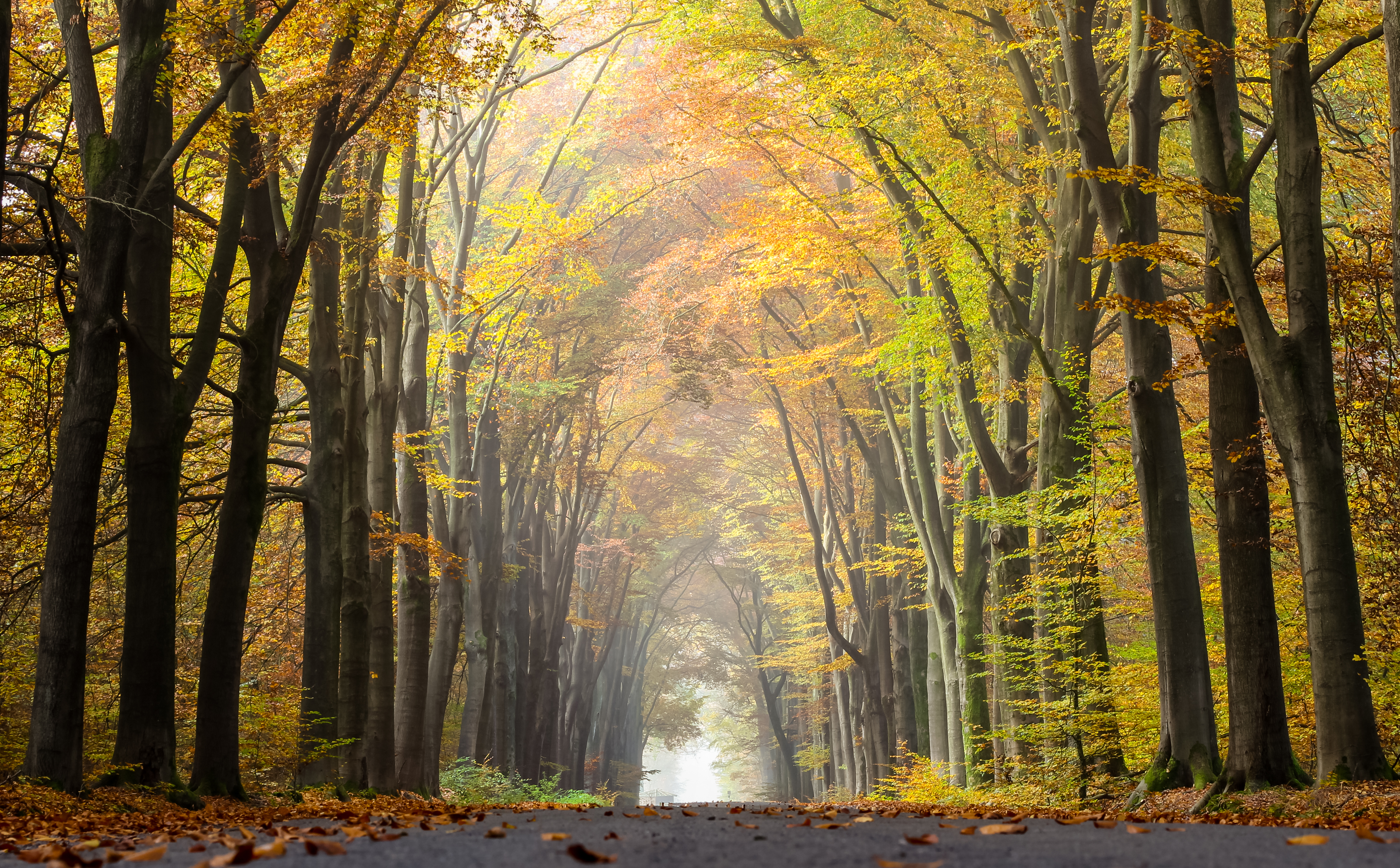
Börnste hamlet, Kirchspiel, Dülmen, North Rhine-Westphalia, Germany

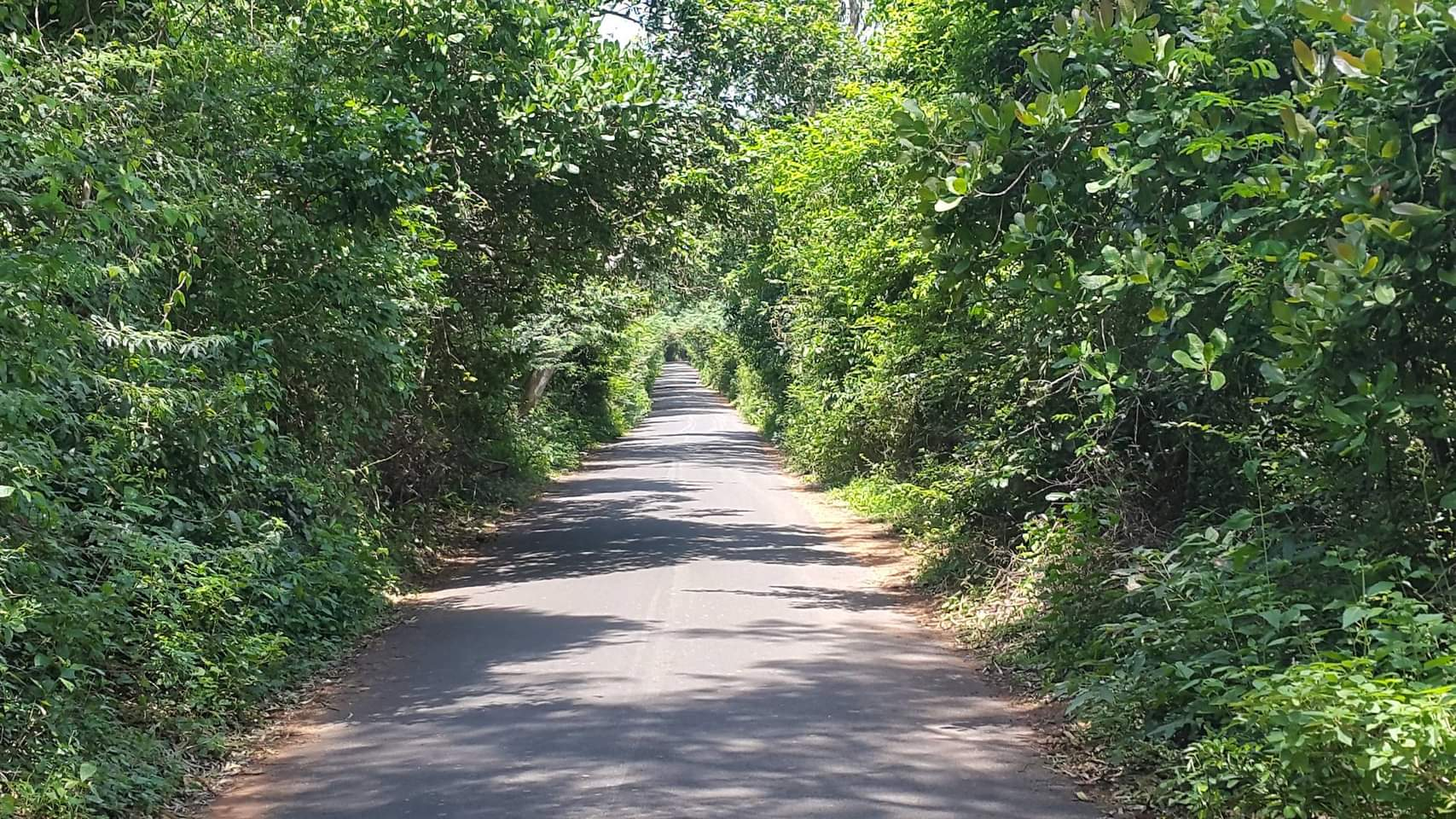
Tree tunnel in Srirampuram village, Rajamahendravaram, Andhra Pradesh, India

== See also ==
- Arbor (garden) – Outdoor garden feature forming a shaded walkway
- Dark Hedges – Avenue of trees in County Antrim, Northern Ireland
- Grove (nature) – Small group of trees
- Sunken lane – Road or track that is lower than the land on either side
- Tunnel of Love (railway) – Section of industrial railway in Ukraine
- Tunnel of Trees – State highway in Emmet County, Michigan, United States
- Vault (architecture) – Architectural term for an arched roof
