= Mykola Koval (pilot) =

Ukrainian fighter pilot

- Микола Коваль
- Born: Mykola Leonidovych Koval; 2 January 1952 (age 74); Kvasyliv, Rivne Oblast, Ukrainian SSR, Soviet Union
- Education: Chernihiv Higher Military School of Pilots, Gagarin Air Force Academy
- Military career
- Allegiance: Ukraine
- Branch: Ukrainian Air Force
- Rank: Colonel
- Conflicts: Soviet–Afghan War
- Awards: Order of Bohdan Khmelnytskyi; Order of Lenin; Order of the Red Banner of Battle; Orders of the Red Star (2); Honorary citizen of Pennsylvania and California

Mykola Leonidovych Koval (Ukrainian: Микола Леонідович Коваль, born 2 January 1952, Kvasyliv, Rivne Oblast) is a Ukrainian fighter pilot, Colonel in the reserve of the Air Force of the Armed Forces of Ukraine, participant of the Afghan war. He is also an honorary citizen of Pennsylvania and California.

== Education ==
Koval studied at Novozdolbuniv school No. 3. In 1973, he graduated from the Chernihiv Higher Military School of Pilots (specialization — military pilot-engineer), and in 1978 — from the Gagarin Air Force Academy. State exams and related flights by the graduating cadets were supervised by a commission of experienced military pilots, headed by the prominent WWII fighter-pilot, three times Hero of the Soviet Union, Air Marshal Ivan Kozhedub. Kozhedub singled out Koval among the other cadets and signed a photograph where he appeared next to Koval with "To pilot Koval from pilot Kozhedub. Become the first among us, equal to the sky."

== Career ==
Koval flew MiG-15, MiG-21, MiG-23, Su-17, Su-25, MiG-29, Su-27. During his career, he served in Afghanistan, Poland, Kazakhstan, and Czechoslovakia.

=== Deployments ===
In 1976, Koval was a squadron commander in one of the air regiments of the Northern Group of Forces of Warsaw Pact countries. He received an award from the Minister of Defense of the USSR for high-performance flights.

In 1984, as a commander of a MiG-23 squadron, Major Mykola Koval and his subordinates went to Bagram Airfield (Afghanistan), where in the first year of service he was appointed senior pilot-inspector of the combat training department of the 40th Army Air Force. While in Afghanistan, he completed 948 sorties and logged over 1500 hours of flight time.

=== Demonstration flights ===
In 1992, Koval demonstrated aerobatics in the United States. He returned home with the title of "Best Diplomat of 1992" and a pendant award from US President Bill Clinton. The pilot also received an award from the President of Ukraine Leonid Kuchma.

In 1996, as part of the Ukrainian Air Force delegation, Koval participated in one of the world's most prestigious military air shows, RIAT. He was awarded the most prestigious transitional prize "Super King of the Air" by Queen Elizabeth II of Great Britain. She also invited the winner to her birthday celebration.

In 1997, Koval was appointed deputy chief of the Combat Training Center of the Ukrainian Air Force. That year he won top prize at the demonstration performance in Tel Aviv (dedicated to the 50th anniversary of the Israeli Air Force).

Later in his career, Koval worked as the general director of an aviation company in Mykolaiv.

== Awards ==
- Order of Bohdan Khmelnytskyi, 3rd class (23 February 2012)
- Order of Lenin
- Order of the Red Banner of Battle
- two Orders of the Red Star
- honorary citizen of Pennsylvania and California
- honorary badge "Glory and Honor" (2012)
