= Timothy Prince =

Timothy George Alexander (Tim) Prince OBE FRAeS (born 1949) is one of the founder members of the Royal International Air Tattoo (RIAT), the world's largest military airshow.

Tim Prince worked for the DoT then the CAA as an Air Traffic Controller from 1966 to 1978. He was one of the team that staged the first Air Tattoo, at North Weald Airfield in 1971. He stood down from his position of Chief Executive of the Royal Air Force Charitable Trust Enterprises and the Royal International Air Tattoo in August 2014. Tim was a founder member and Trustee of the Royal International Air Tattoo Flying Scholarships for Disabled People (FSDP and formerly Flying Scholarships for the Disabled) which was established by the Air Tattoo team in 1983 in memory of Group Captain Sir Douglas Bader who had been its President since 1976 until his passing in 1982.

In addition to now being an aviation and event consultant Tim holds positions as an Honorary RIAT Vice Patron and an FSDP Vice Patron. He lives in Gloucestershire, UK with his wife Penny Prince, an artist, with whom he has two sons, Rufus Prince and Hugh Prince all of whom have been a part of the Air Tattoo volunteer organisation at one time or another.

Tim Prince was appointed Officer of the Order of the British Empire (OBE) in the 2009 Birthday Honours.
