= Klevan =

Rural locality in Rivne Oblast, Ukraine

Klevan Клевань
- Rural settlement
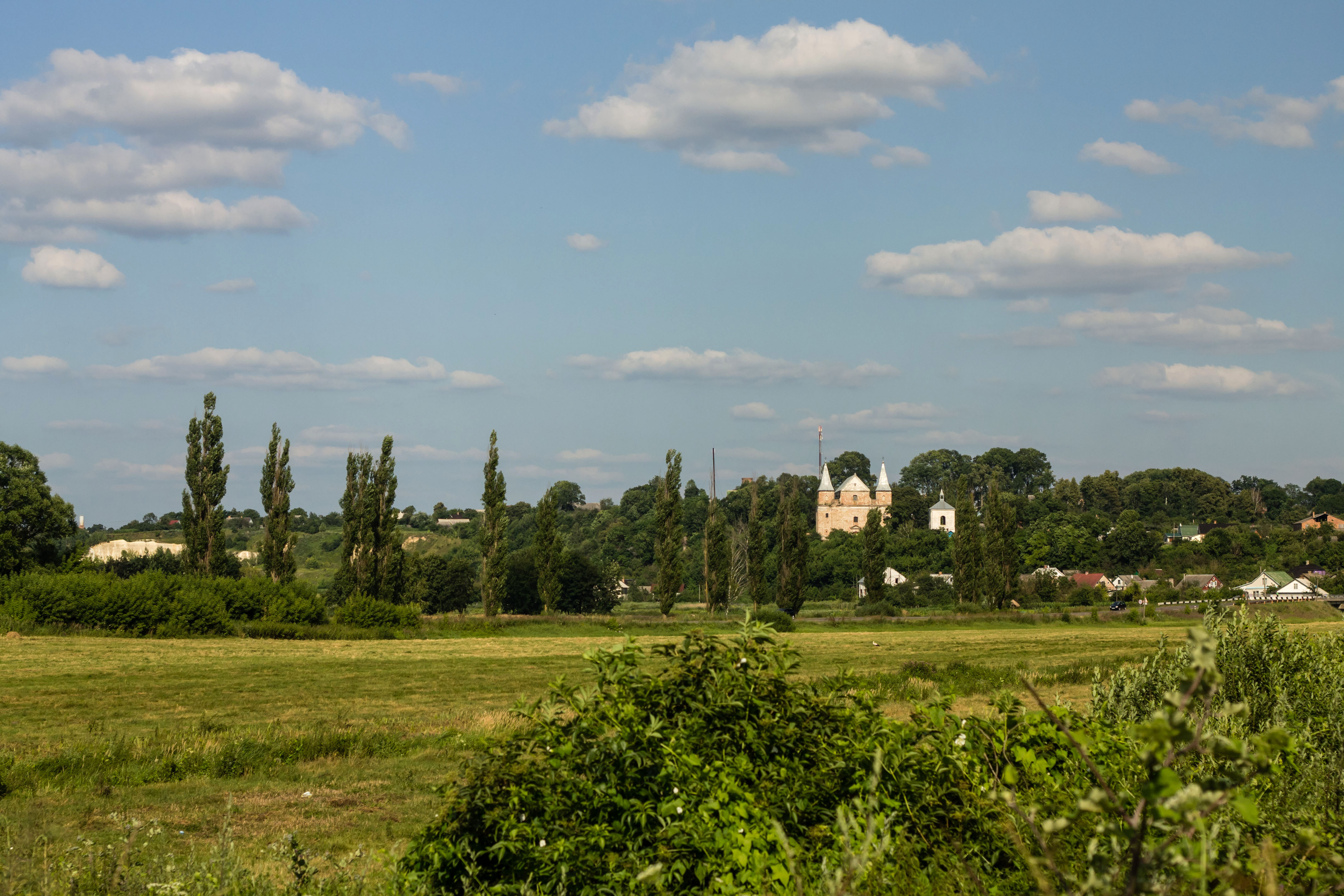

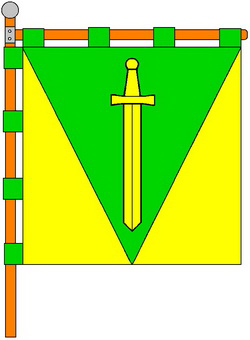
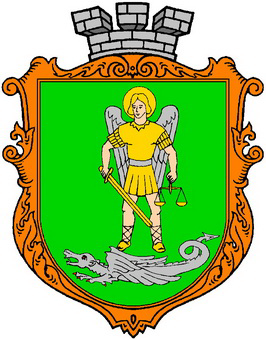
- Flag Coat of arms

- Location of Klevan in Ukraine Klevan (Ukraine)
- Coordinates: 50°44′47″N 26°1′18″E
- Country: Ukraine
- Oblast: Rivne Oblast
- District: Rivne Raion
- Hromada: Klevan settlement hromada
- Founded: 1458
- Town status: 1654

Government
  - Town Head: Oleh Kostevych
- Elevation: 218 m (715 ft)

Population (2001)
  - Total: 7,470
- Time zone: UTC+2 (EET)
  - Summer (DST): UTC+3 (EEST)
- Postal code: 35312
- Area code: +380 3622
- Website: Official website

Klevan (Ukrainian: Клевань) is a rural settlement in Rivne Raion (district) of Rivne Oblast (province) in western Ukraine. Its population was 7,470 at the 2001 Ukrainian census. Current population: 7,570 (2022 estimate) It is located in the historic region of Volhynia.

== History ==
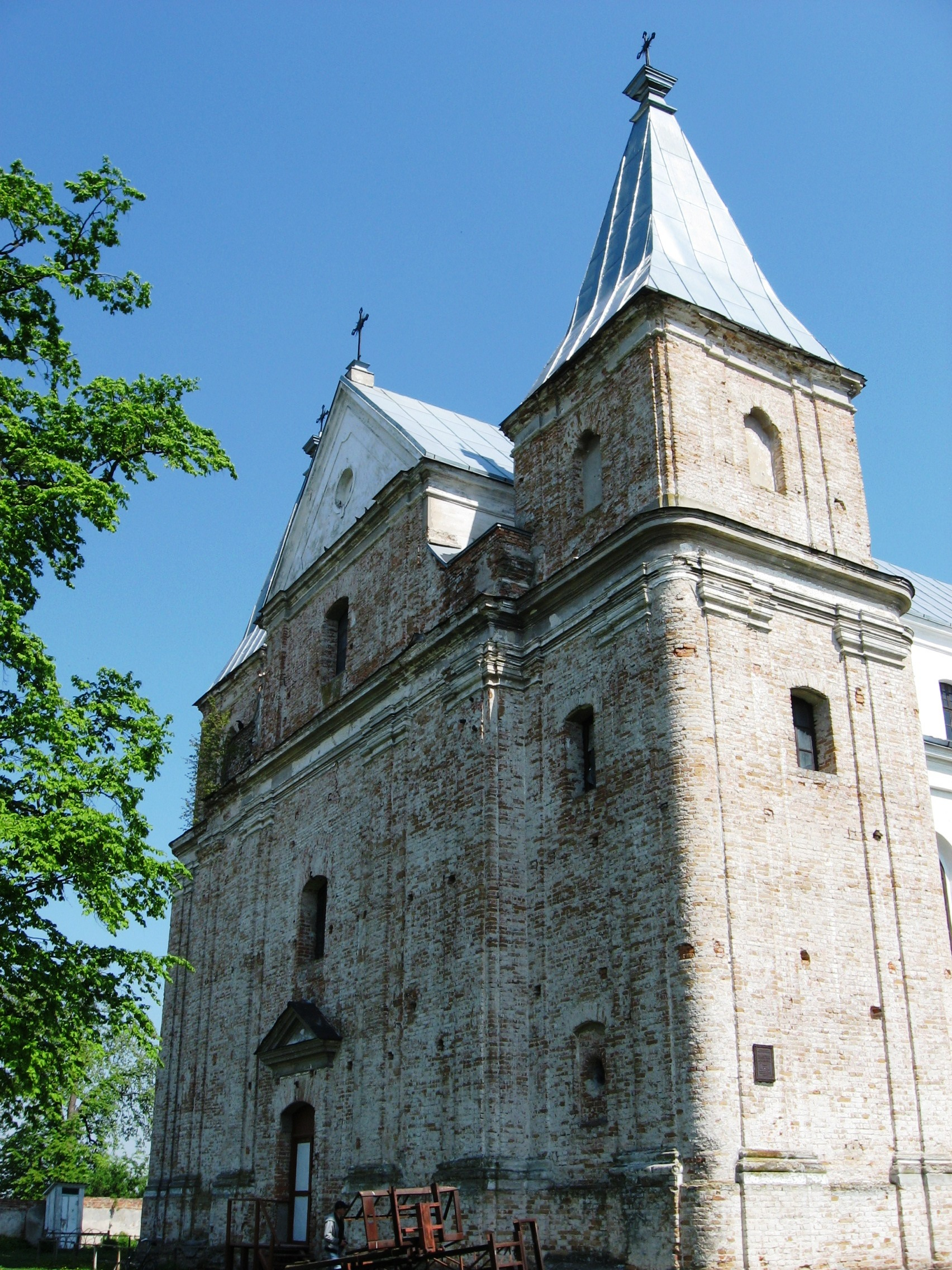
Annunciation Church

A settlement on the current territory of Klevan was first founded in the beginning of the 12th century on the banks of the Stubla River, a tributary of the Horyn. At the time, the settlement was named Kolyvan or Kolivan (Ukrainian: Коливань). The first written mention of Klevan appeared in 1458, as a possession of the Czartoryski family. Construction of the castle was started by Michał Czartoryski in 1454, and completed by his son Fedor. In the 1590s, Jerzy Czartoryski built the Church of the Assumption, which became one of the burial places of the Czartoryski family. Klewań was plundered by the Cossacks in 1648 and partly destroyed by the Tatars in 1653. In 1654, King John II Casimir Vasa vested the settlement with Magdeburg rights, established two annual fairs and two weekly markets. He also established the town's coat of arms, depicting Archangel Michael. Mikołaj Czartoryski built a town hall and established bakers' and weavers' guilds. Klewań, as it was known in Polish, was a private town, administratively located in the Volhynian Voivodeship in the Lesser Poland Province of the Kingdom of Poland.

The town was annexed by Russia in the Second Partition of Poland in 1793. As a result of Russian discriminatory policies (see Pale of Settlement), it saw an influx of Jews. The Polish district school operated until 1831, when it was subjected to Russification as a part of repression for the unsuccessful Polish November Uprising. Following World War I, the town became again part of Poland, within which it was administratively located in the Równe County in the Wołyń Voivodeship. According to the 1921 Polish census, the population of the town with the adjacent railway settlement was 61.2% Jewish, 22.6% Polish and 12.1% Ukrainian.

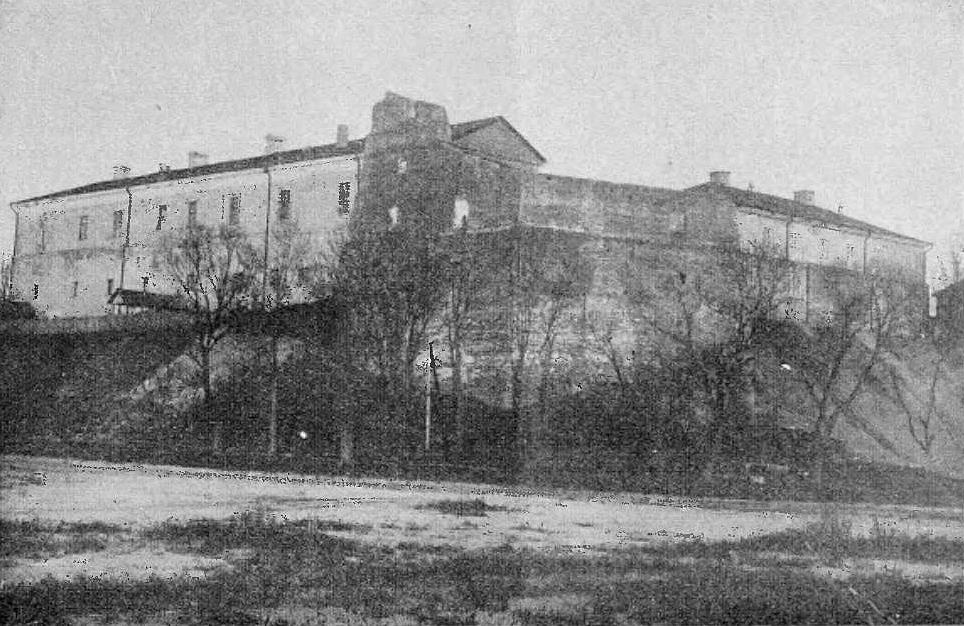
Czartoryski Castle in 1936

Following the invasion of Poland, which started World War II in September 1939, it was first occupied by the Soviet Union until 1941, and then by Nazi Germany. In 1940, the town's status was changed to an urban-type settlement. In 1941, the local synagogue was burned by the Nazis and the local Jews were exterminated. The Czartoryski Castle served as a Communist and Nazi prison during Soviet and German occupation, respectively. In 1944, the settlement was re-occupied by the Soviets, and then eventually annexed from Poland the following year. The Poles continued to live in Klevan until they were evicted by the Soviets. By June 1945, some 800 expelled Poles from Klevan settled in Skwierzyna. Klevan also became the centre of the deployment of national-liberation struggle of the Ukrainian Insurgent Army.

Under the Soviet Union Klevan served as a district centre. In 1979, it had a population of 8,400 people.

Until 26 January 2024, Klevan was designated urban-type settlement. On this day, a new law entered into force which abolished this status, and Klevan became a rural settlement.

== Geography ==
Klevan is accessed via the T1817 and H22 roads, and is located 28.3 km northwest of Rivne and 50.4 kilometres southeast of Lutsk along the H22. Klevan lies on the Stubla River, a tributary of Horyn.

== Notable landmarks ==
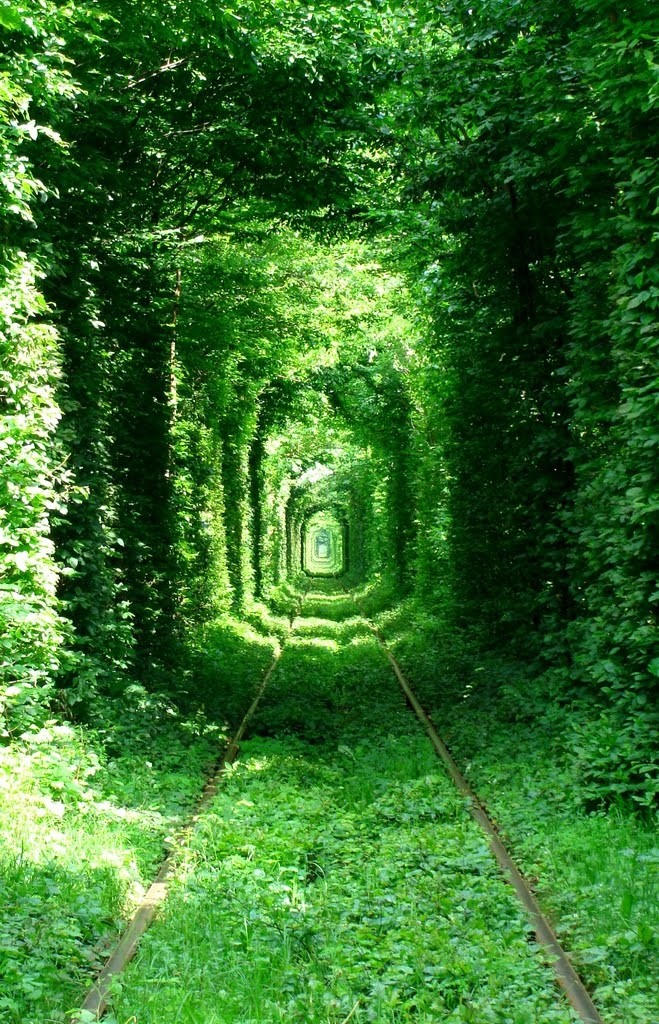
Tunnel of Love near Klevan

Klevan contains the ruins of Klevan Castle, whose construction began in 1475 and was eventually completed in 1561. The town also houses the Church of the Annunciation with a bell tower dating back to 1630, as well as the Church of the Nativity, which was built in 1777. There is also Klevan Railway station, which connects the town with the oblast's administrative center Rivne and Kivertsi, as well as a woodworking plant and food-processing facilities.

An industrial railway enclosed by trees, which has become a walkway for lovers known as the Tunnel of Love is also located near Klevan.

== People from Klevan ==
- Michał Fryderyk Czartoryski (1696–1775), Polish nobleman, Duke of Klewań and Żuków

== See also ==
- Kvasyliv and Orzhiv, the other two urban-type settlements in Rivne Raion of Rivne Oblast
