= Royal International Air Tattoo =

Military air show in Wiltshire, England

- RIAT logo
- Status: Active
- Genre: Air show
- Frequency: Annually
- Venue: MOD Boscombe Down, Wiltshire, England
- Established: 1971; 55 years ago
- Previous event: 18–20 July 2025
- Next event: 16–18 July 2027
- Attendance: 200,000 (2023)
- Major events: Aerobatic and static displays
- Website: www.airtattoo.com

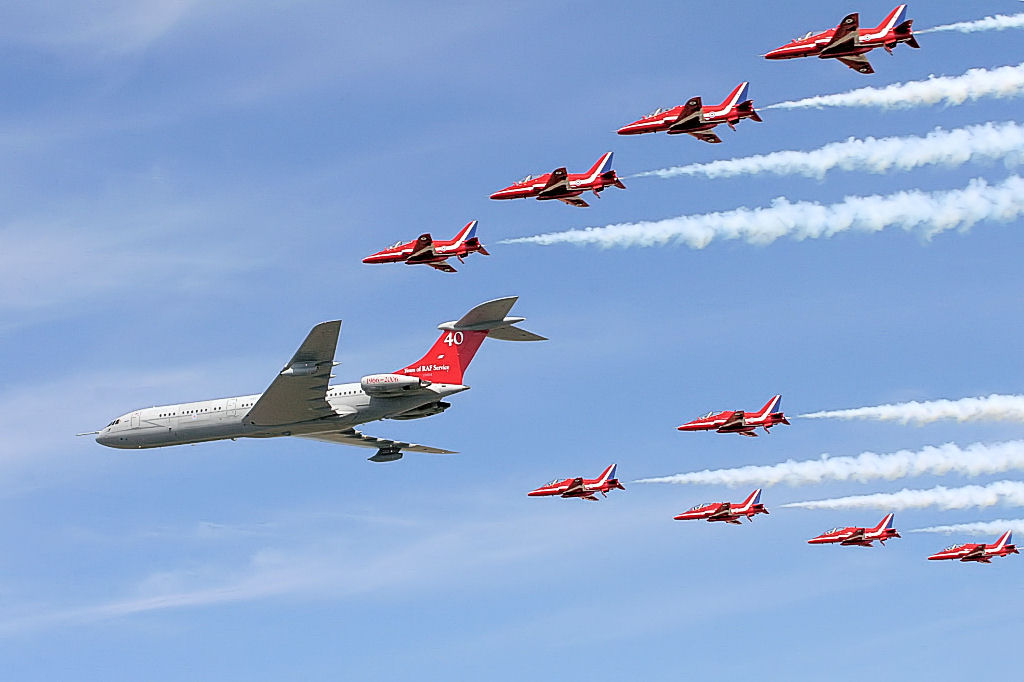
The Red Arrows fly in formation with an RAF Vickers VC10 at RIAT 2006

The Royal International Air Tattoo (RIAT) is the world's largest military airshow, held annually in July, in support of The Royal Air Force Charitable Trust. The show typically attracts a total of 150,000 to 200,000 spectators over the weekend. RIAT often features upwards of 200 aircraft over the weekend in July, visiting from countries across the globe. RIAT has 200+ static aircraft attend over the weekend and normally around 25+ flying displays each day of the event.

== History ==
The first Air Tattoo was staged at North Weald Airfield in Essex in 1971, with just over 100 aircraft taking part. The event was founded by Paul Bowen and Timothy Prince, who were CAA air traffic controllers, and Air Marshal Sir Denis Crowley-Milling. From 1973 to 1983 it was held intermittently at RAF Greenham Common, initially under the title of the Royal Air Forces Association, South Eastern Area, Air Tattoo before moving to RAF Fairford in 1985. The show became the International Air Tattoo in 1976, and recognition of its unique status was granted by Elizabeth II in 1996, when the current Royal International Air Tattoo title was adopted.

- The show took place at Fairford every two years until it became an annual show from 1993. Due to redevelopment work at RAF Fairford the show was held at RAF Cottesmore, Rutland in 2000 and 2001.
- Guinness World Records have recognised RIAT 2003 as the world's largest ever military airshow, with 535 aircraft in attendance.
- RIAT 2022 saw 266 aircraft from 33 nations on display, as the show returned from an extended hiatus due to COVID-19.

The event has had a number of air show firsts, including the first display and landing of the B-2A Spirit stealth bomber outside the United States of America during the 1997 "50 Years of the USAF" event and in 2008 the first landing of the Lockheed F-22 Raptor in Europe.

The RIAT has evolved into an important showcase for the world's military, taking place the week after the annual Global Air & Space Chiefs' Conference in London and the week before the bi-annual Farnborough Airshow which occurs in 'even' years. RIAT allows the military aerospace industry to showcase its products to both the general public and customers in a more relaxed environment outside the commercial selling pressure of the Farnborough trade show. The Farnborough show also restricts public attendance, in 2022 this was to a single day with free entry for under-21s to promote aerospace careers/recruitment.

As an extension to the Air Tattoo, Bowen and Price started the Flying Scholarship for Disabled People in 1983 in memory of Douglas Bader, who was a war hero and pilot despite losing his legs in an aerobatic crash. They have given over 400 scholarships to people with all types of disabilities and carry on the legacy of Bader.

=== 2008 cancellation ===
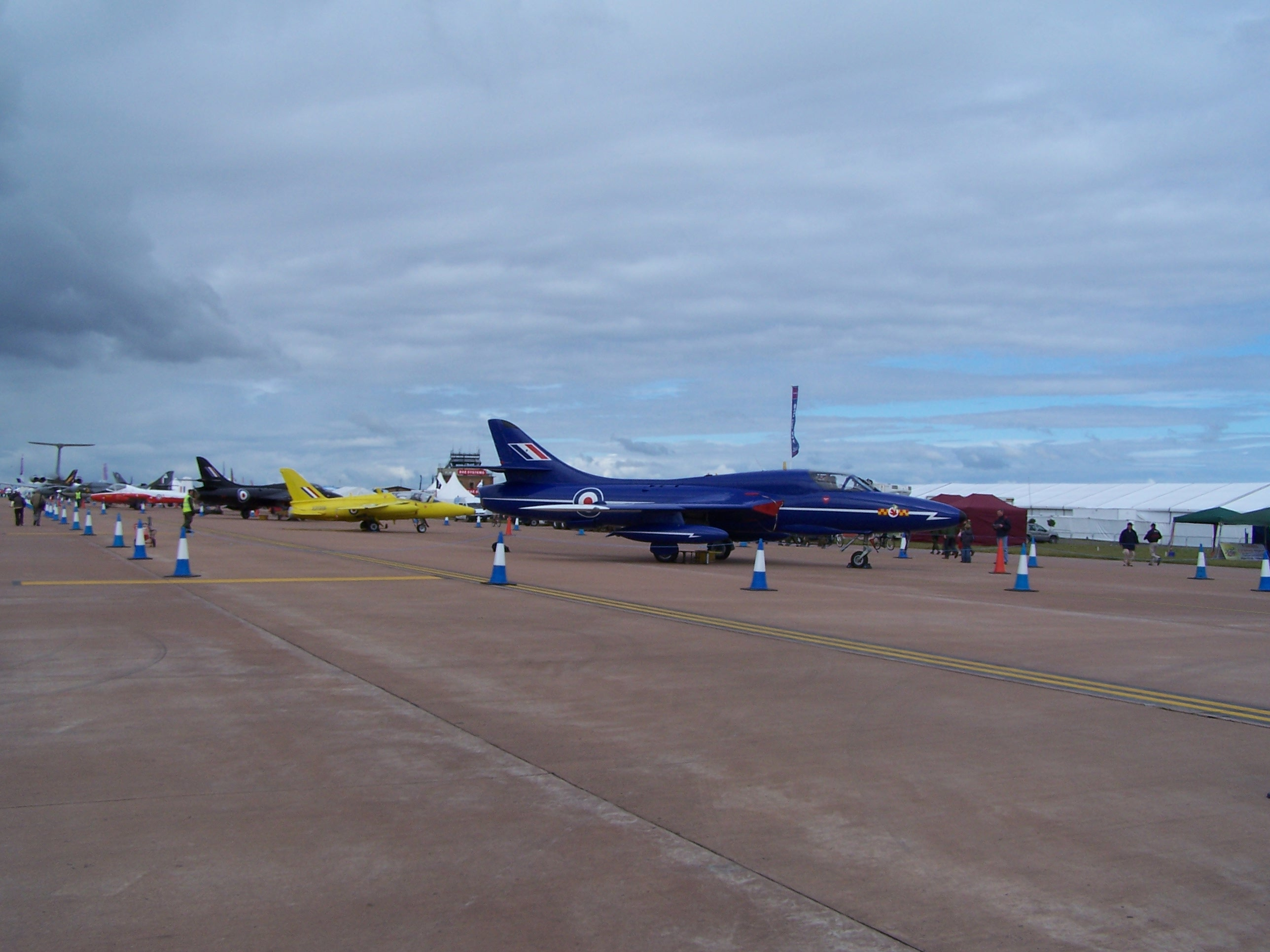
Vintage aircraft sit on the runway following the cancellation of RIAT 2008

The 2008 airshow was to feature two themes, the 90th Anniversary of the Royal Air Force and Global Engagement and was scheduled to be held on 12–13 July. The USAF Air Combat Command's F-22 Raptor Demo Team had made the first trans-Atlantic flight for the new stealth aircraft to participate in the show. On 11 July, the day before the air show opened to the public, Queen Elizabeth II presented, in poor weather conditions, new colours to the RAF and RAF Regiment in front of selected guests and VIPs. A week of heavy rainfall made the already-waterlogged car parks and parts of the airfield unusable. Safety concerns for the hundreds of thousands of expected visitors led the organisers to a last-minute cancellation of the public section of RIAT for the first time in the show's history.

=== RIAT 2009 ===
RIAT 2009 was held on 18–19 July 2009. The show celebrated the 60th anniversary of NATO by charting its history in chronological order. The show also featured a Search and Rescue display to recognise the significance of missions undertaken by the aircraft and people that undertake these jobs. The show reportedly had over 160,000 spectators.

=== RIAT 2010 ===
RIAT 2010 was held on 17–18 July 2010. The themes for the show were the 70th anniversary of the Battle of Britain, Training Aircraft and the 150th anniversary of Cadets. Nine members of the Royal Canadian Air Cadets and three members of the New Zealand Air Training Corps were invited to the event for the first time, as part of the International Air Cadet Exchange. The F-22 Raptor also appeared in its first RIAT flying display since 2008's cancelled show. Notable visitors to the 2010 show included James May and David Jason.

=== RIAT 2011 ===
RIAT 2011 was held on 16–17 July 2011. This Air Tattoo looked back over the past four decades as it celebrated the show's 40th anniversary with a series of special aerial displays and ground entertainment. It also hosted a gathering of specially-decorated "Tiger" aircraft from the NATO Tiger Association. Tiger aircraft came from NATO squadrons that have a Tiger or Big Cat in their emblem and their association marked its 50th anniversary in 2011. RIAT 2011 saw a smaller crowd than usual of 138,000 attend the show. The pilot of the SoloTürk team, Murat Keleş was honoured with the highest award, the King Hussein Memorial Sword for the Best Overall Flying Demonstration.

=== RIAT 2012 ===
RIAT 2012 was held on 7–8 July 2012. It saw the debut of Royal Air Force's largest-ever aircraft, the Airbus Voyager; its new aerial refuelling multi-role tanker transport (MRTT) aircraft, which are military-converted Airbus A330 wide-body airliners. Another debut was the Black Eagles aerobatic team from South Korea and Japan became the 54th nation to participate at the tattoo with the arrival of one of its four Boeing KC-767Js operated by the Japan Air Self-Defense Force, which also brought the JASDF Taiko Drummers to the show.

=== RIAT 2013 ===
RIAT 2013 took place on 20–21 July 2013. Invitations of participation were distributed to over 70 countries. The programme featured an Airbus A400M Atlas and one of the first deliveries of the Airbus A380 to British Airways, both of which flew in formation with the Royal Air Force Red Arrows aerobatic team over the show weekend. RIAT 2013 was also notable due to the lack of U.S. military aircraft represented at the event, due to U.S. government sequestration.

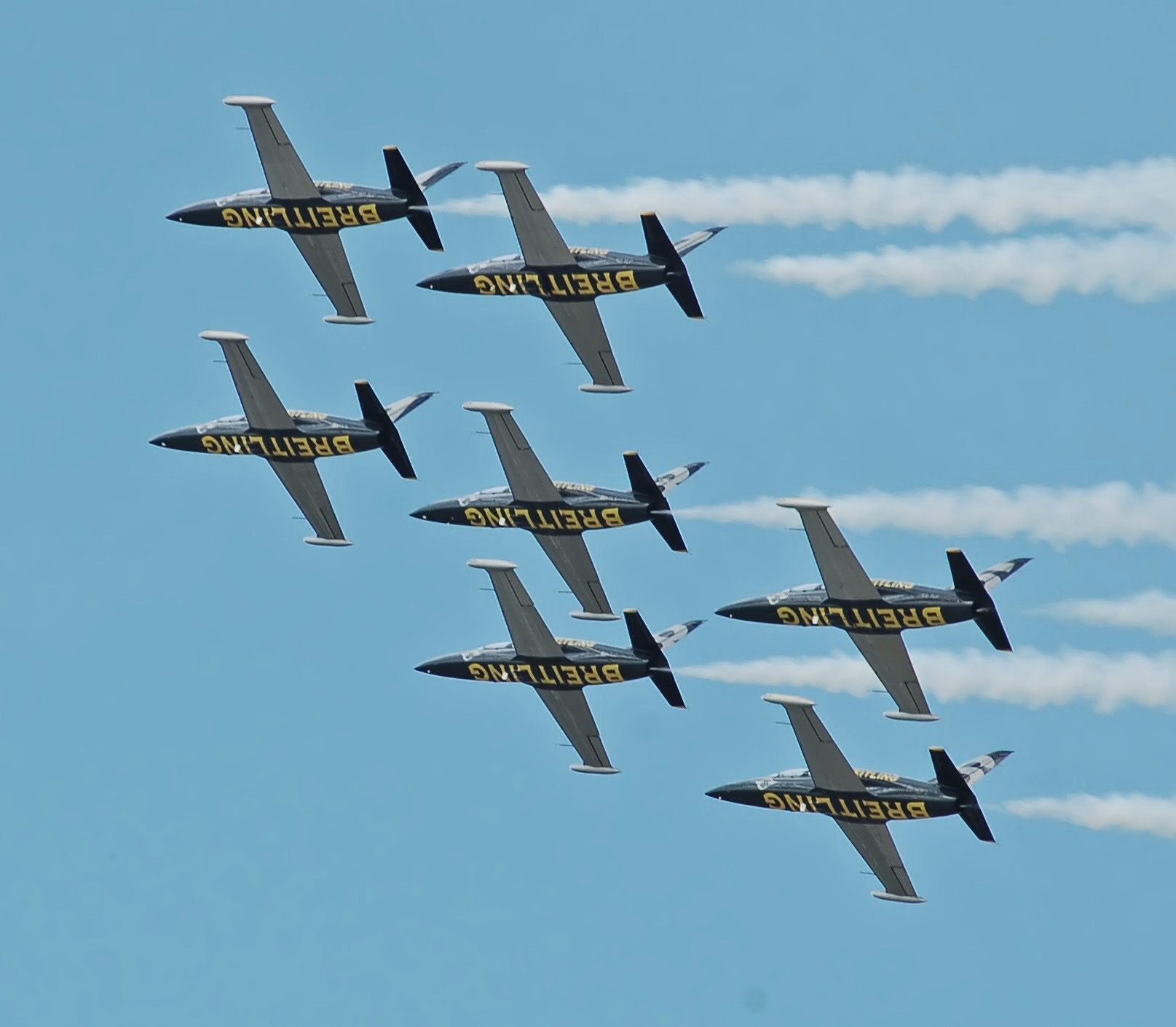
Aero L-39 Albatros aircraft of the Breitling Jet Team perform at RIAT 2014.

=== RIAT 2014 ===
RIAT 2014 took place 11–13 July 2014; the first time in its history that the show has been open to the public on a Friday. The Lockheed Martin F-35 Lightning II was to make its anticipated European debut but was grounded in the U. S. due to an engine failure before it could cross the Atlantic. Highlights of 2014's show included a pair of Polish Air Force Sukhoi Su-22 Fitters along with celebrations for the 50th display season of the Red Arrows.

=== RIAT 2015 ===
RIAT 2015 was staged from 17–19 July 2015. The show's main theme was the celebration of 75 years since the Battle of Britain took place in the summer of 1940. RIAT 2015 also marked the last year of Avro Vulcan XH558's airworthiness, being retired later in the year. The show also paid tribute to 35 years of the Tri-National Tornado Training Establishment, with three aircraft performing flypasts over the weekend. Other participants included the Finnish Air Force F/A-18C Hornet, a British Airways Airbus A318 and the British debut of the Japanese Maritime Self Defence Force's Kawasaki P-1, which performed in the flying display, as well as the static park.

=== RIAT 2016 ===
RIAT 2016 took place from 8–10 July 2016. This show revolved around the latest generation of military aircraft types. The F-35 Lightning II (both the 'A' and 'B' variants) made its UK debut after its cancellation in 2014, and the Lockheed Martin F-22 Raptor also made a rare appearance. Other acts included the Swedish Air Force Saab Gripen and French Air Force Dassault Rafale. Notable static display items included the Hellenic Air Force F-4 Phantom, the first UK airshow appearance of a German Air Force Airbus A400M and the last airshow appearance of the QinetiQ Alpha Jet.

=== RIAT 2017 ===
RIAT 2017 took place between 14–17 July 2017. The show was a tribute to the 70th anniversary of the United States Air Force (USAF) and saw the return of the Thunderbirds demonstration team for the first time in 10 years. The show featured a special flypast from the USAF that included a C-130 Hercules, three F-15E Strike Eagles, two F-16 Fighting Falcons, a KC-135 Stratotanker and on the Sunday a special appearance from a B-2 Spirit stealth bomber. There was also a display from the F-22 Raptor on the Sunday of the show. A Sea King Helicopter from the Belgian Air Component performed a search and rescue demo.

The flying display also saw the Ukrainian Air Force Sukhoi Su-27 as a last minute addition as well as the Battle of Britain Memorial Flight Avro Lancaster bomber flying with three Spitfires and a Hurricane in a formation known as Thompson formation. Notable static displays included two F-4 Phantoms from the Hellenic Air Force, a second Ukrainian Su-27 and an Ilyushin Il-76. The USAF provided many aircraft for static including a B-1 Lancer, B-52 Stratofortress and a Lockheed U-2 reconnaissance aircraft.

=== RIAT 2018 ===
RIAT 2018 was staged over 13–15 July 2018. The 2018 show featured 302 aircraft from 43 air arms and 30 nations, and featured a celebration of the centenary of the founding of the Royal Air Force. The show included a special "Dambusters Tribute Flypast" featuring an Avro Lancaster of the Battle of Britain Memorial Flight accompanied by a Panavia Tornado and Lockheed Martin F-35 Lightning II aircraft, all operated by the No. 617 Squadron RAF. Other flying highlights included displays by the USAF Heritage Flight; a Ukrainian Air Force Sukhoi Su-27; a Royal Canadian Air Force McDonnell Douglas CF-18 Hornet; a French Aéronavale Dassault Rafale duo; the Italian Air Force's Frecce Tricolori aerobatic display team, and the RAF's Red Arrows. Visitors on Saturday were treated to a rare flypast by a USAF Northrop Grumman B-2 Spirit stealth bomber that had made the round trip from Whiteman Air Force Base in Missouri, United States.

In the static aircraft display there were examples of aircraft from around the world including debut appearances by an Embraer KC-390 from Brazil, a Kawasaki C-2 from Japan and an HH-101A variant of the AgustaWestland AW101 tactical helicopter from the Italian Air Force.

=== RIAT 2019 ===
RIAT 2019 was staged from 19–21 July 2019, with 245 aircraft in attendance. The theme for the 2019 show was 'Air and Space, inspiring the next generation air force' and Tim Peake was among the guest speakers. The show also celebrated the 70th anniversary of NATO. Notable appearances included the Turkish Air Force F-4 Phantom on static display, a flying display from the heavily upgraded Romanian Air Force MiG-21 LanceR-C, designed in the 1950s, and the Spanish Navy's EAV-8B Matador II Plus on flying display. 2019 marked the centenary of British Airways, and, as such, a British Airways Boeing 747 in BOAC livery performed a flypast in formation with the Red Arrows on the Saturday. Sunday saw another pair of flypasts, most notably from the Red Arrows and Patrouille de France, who flew together, both in their 'Concorde' formation, to mark 50 years since the aircraft's first flight. To celebrate the 70th anniversary of NATO, a flypast took place on both Friday and Saturday, consisting of many F-16s and Eurofighter Typhoons from different air arms, three USAF F-15s, and a French Air Force C-135 tanker.

=== RIAT 2020 & 2021 cancellations ===
RIAT 2020 was due to be staged from 17–19 July 2020, but was cancelled due to the effects of the COVID-19 pandemic. In its place a 'Virtual Air Tattoo' took place online that weekend, featuring content from past editions of the show as well as virtual displays from aerobatic teams in Digital Combat Simulator.

RIAT 2021 was scheduled to take place from 16–18 July 2021, and was due to celebrate the 50th anniversary of the show. However, it was cancelled for the second year running due to the continuing COVID-19 pandemic and the uncertainty of restrictions on both large crowds and international travel being in place by then.

=== RIAT 2022 ===
After two years of being cancelled, RIAT 2022 was staged from 15–17 July 2022 and featured 266 aircraft. The show heavily focused on training aircraft as this years operational theme was 'Training the Next Generation Air Force' but it also focused on the 75th Anniversary of the USAF, which included a rare appearance of the Boeing E-4 performing a flypast on the Friday and being on static display over the weekend. The Airbus BelugaXL made its Air Tattoo debut on the Saturday, performing two flypasts. One of the special guests of this year was actor Tom Cruise.

=== RIAT 2023 ===
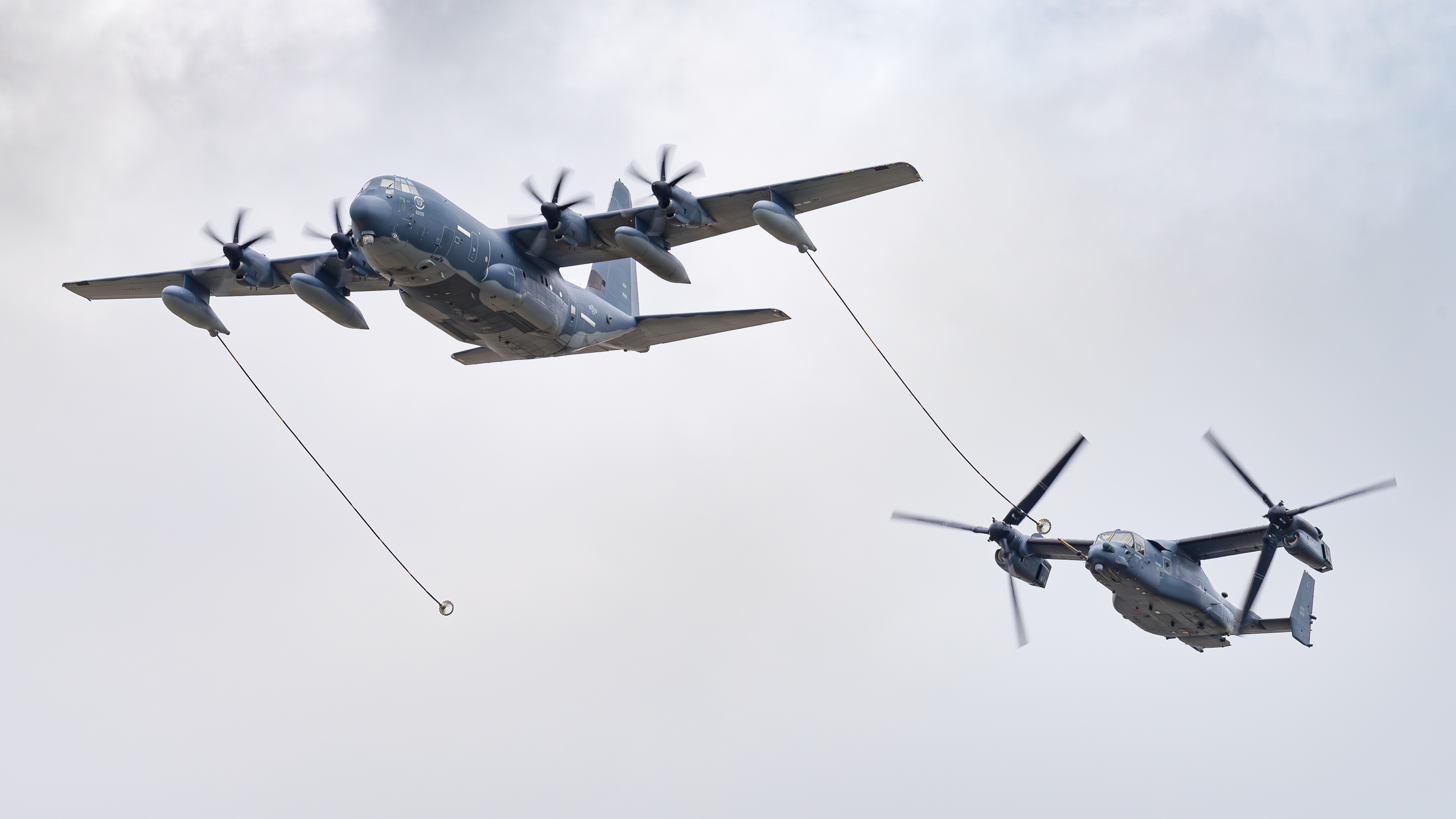
Demonstration of air-to-air refuelling a CV-22B Osprey at RIAT 2023

RIAT 2023 was staged from 14–16 July 2023. The theme for RIAT 2023 was SKYTANKER23, focusing on aircraft capable of performing air-to-air refueling as 2023 is the centenary of the first air-to-air refueling. Also the 100th anniversary of the Italian Air Force was celebrated with a large number of Italian aircraft. Heavy rain and high winds saw the cancellation of many of the planned flying displays on Friday and Saturday, with the "star" of the show, a replica Messerschmitt Me 262, making its only flying appearance on Sunday. Further highlights were the return of an Italian A-129 Mangusta, a Spanish Navy McDonnell Douglas AV-8B Harrier II, a rare appearance of an American WC-130J Weatherbird, and the return of the Al Fursan display team from the UAE since their last appearance in 2012.

=== RIAT 2024 ===
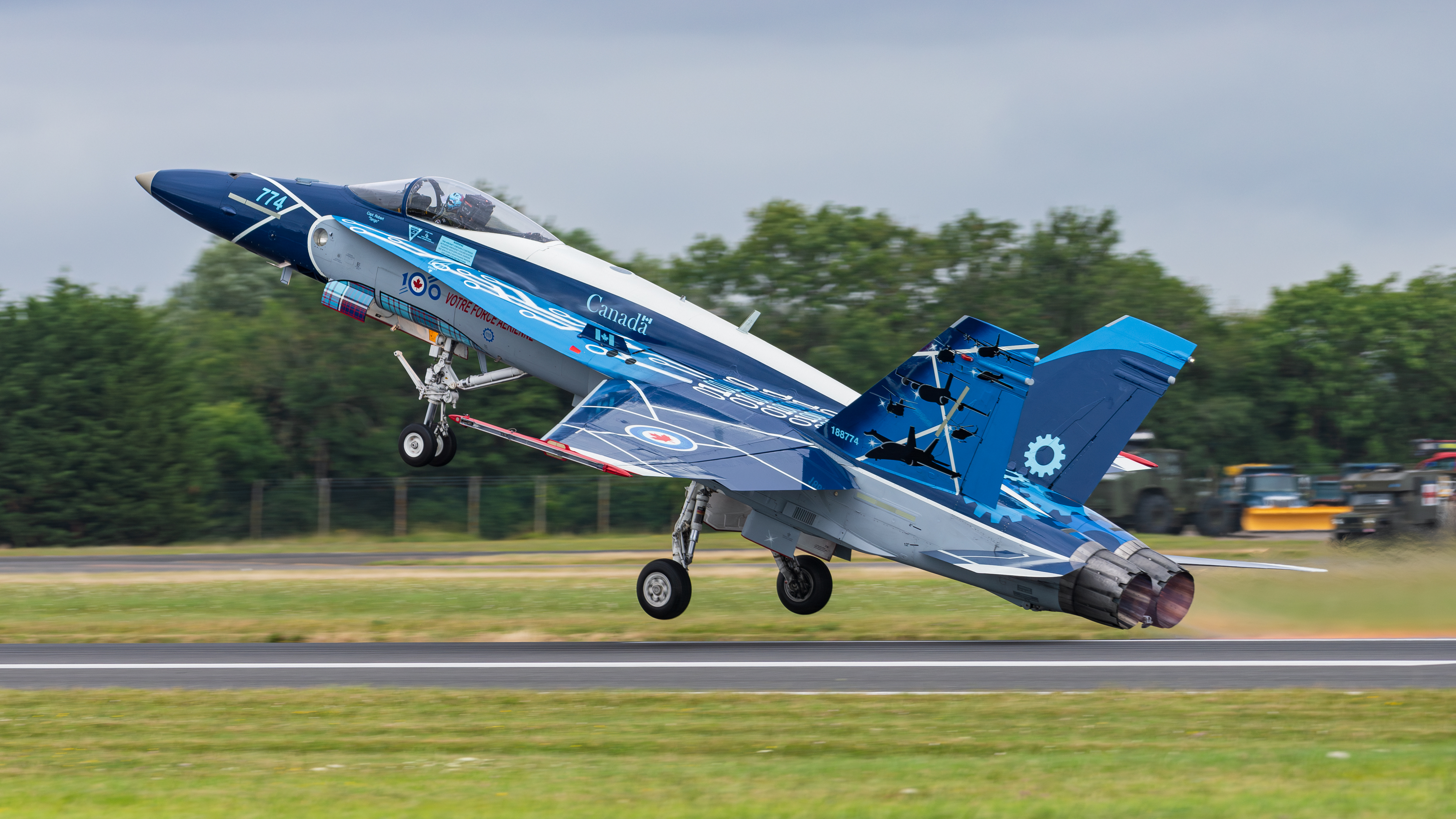
CF-18A Hornet of the RCAF with a special 100th anniversary livery starting its display at RIAT 2024.

RIAT 2024 was staged from 19–21 July 2024. The main theme celebrated the 50th anniversary of the F-16 Fighting Falcon with aircraft appearing in both the flying and static displays. 16 aircraft from across Europe appeared in the static display together in what the event referred to as the "Viper Line". Other themes commemorated the 75th anniversary of NATO which saw a special flypast on the Friday and the 100th anniversary of the Royal Canadian Air Force which also included displays by a CF-18 Hornet and a flypast with a Supermarine Spitfire painted in the colour scheme of a Royal Canadian Air Force squadron that served with the Royal Air Force. Some other notable highlights included a USAF Lockheed U-2 Dragon Lady which flew a rare role demonstration on the Friday and The Qatari Emiri Air Force which sent an F-15EX Eagle II (the QA 'Ababil' variant). The display was sponsored by Boeing themselves and had two test pilots performing different routines across the weekend. The Royal Air Force also included a role demonstration of an F-35B Lightning which performed on all 3 days.

=== RIAT 2025 ===
RIAT 2025 took place between 18–20 July. The show had been given the theme "Eyes in the Skies." It entailed aircraft themed around airborne early warning, aerial surveillance, maritime patrol, and other forms of airborne reconnaissance and surveillance. Pakistan's C-130H Hercules aircraft received the "Concours d’Elegance Trophy" for best-maintained and most aesthetically presented aircraft. RIAT 2025 also had the public debut of the RAF's new E7 Wedgetail which was on Saturday.

=== RIAT 2026 cancellation ===
RIAT 2026 was cancelled due the uncertainties over access to RAF Fairford in the context of the 2026 Iran War.

In November 2026, it was announced that RIAT 2027 and future events will relocate to MOD Boscombe Down.

== Incidents ==
=== Mid-air collision at IAT 1993 ===
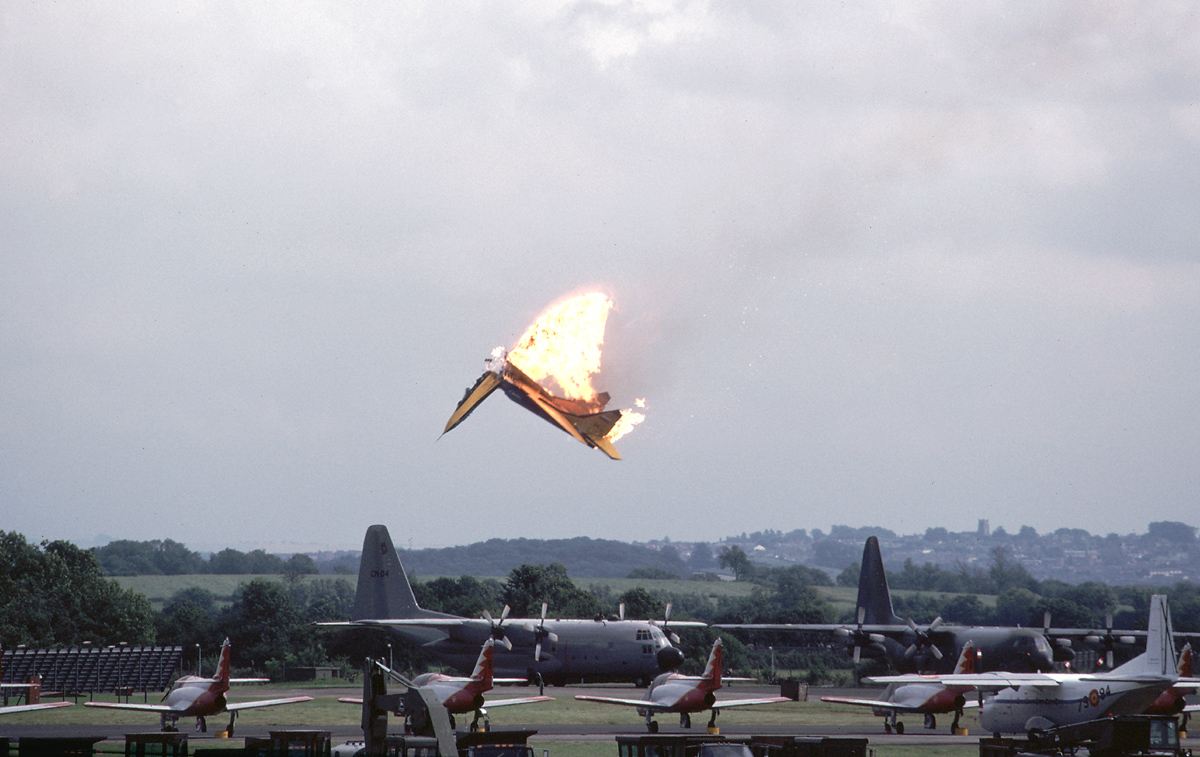
MiG-29 crashing at Fairford in 1993 after a collision.

On 24 July 1993, two MiG-29 Fulcrums of the Russian Air Force collided in mid-air and crashed away from the public. No one was hurt. After ejecting, the two pilots landed safely. Investigators later determined that pilot error was the cause, after one pilot did a reverse loop and disappeared into the clouds, the other one lost sight of his wingman and aborted the routine.

=== 2002 Italian Air Force accident ===
In 2002 a G-222 of the Italian Air Force made a hard landing after demonstrating a steep descent approach, collapsing the nosewheel and causing a fire. The crew evacuated the aircraft safely and the show was paused while the runway was cleared of the damaged aircraft.

== See also ==
- Mykola Koval (pilot)
