= List of Shuttle Carrier Aircraft flights =

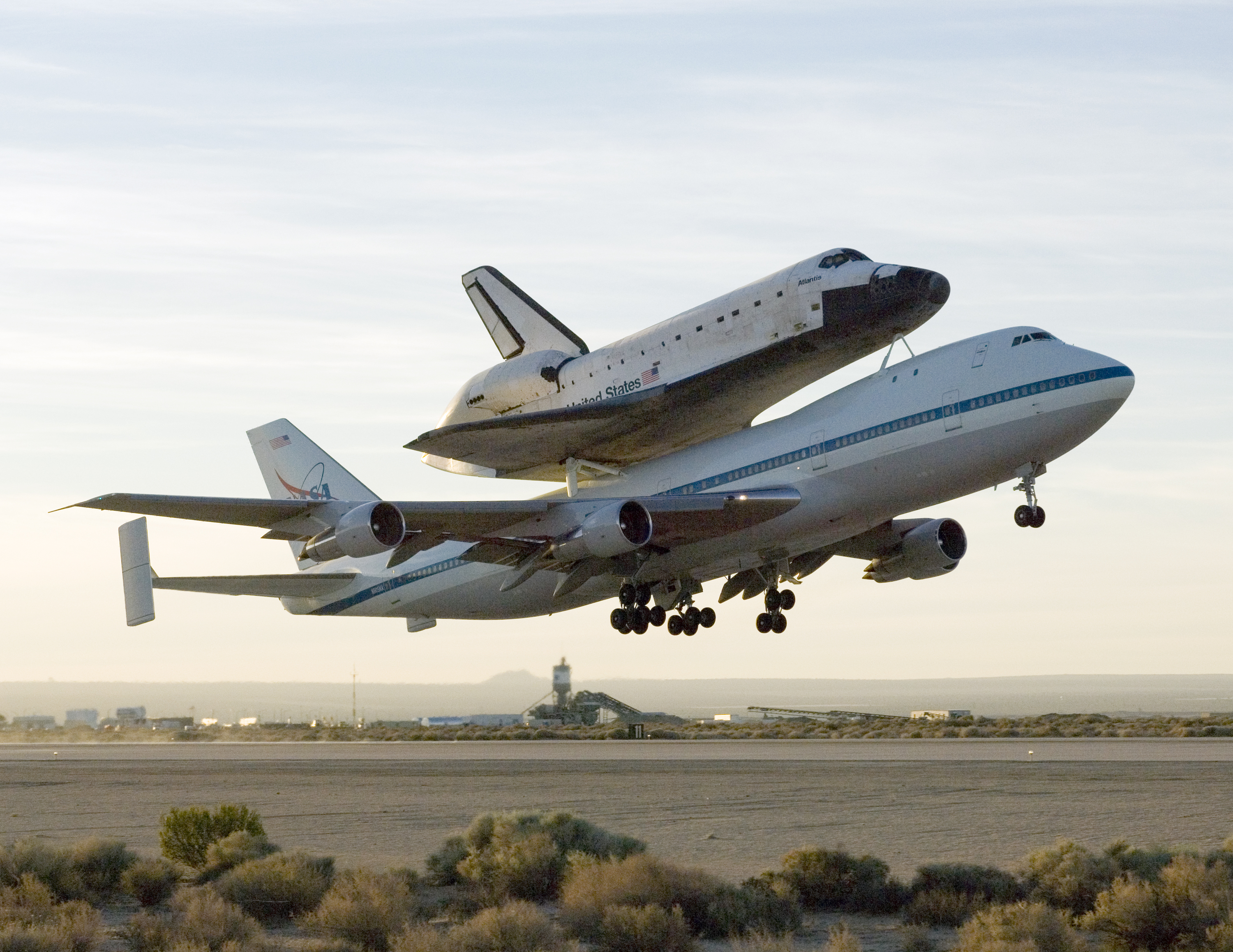
A 747 Shuttle Carrier Aircraft carrying the space shuttle Atlantis taking off from Edwards Air Force Base in California on 1 July 2007

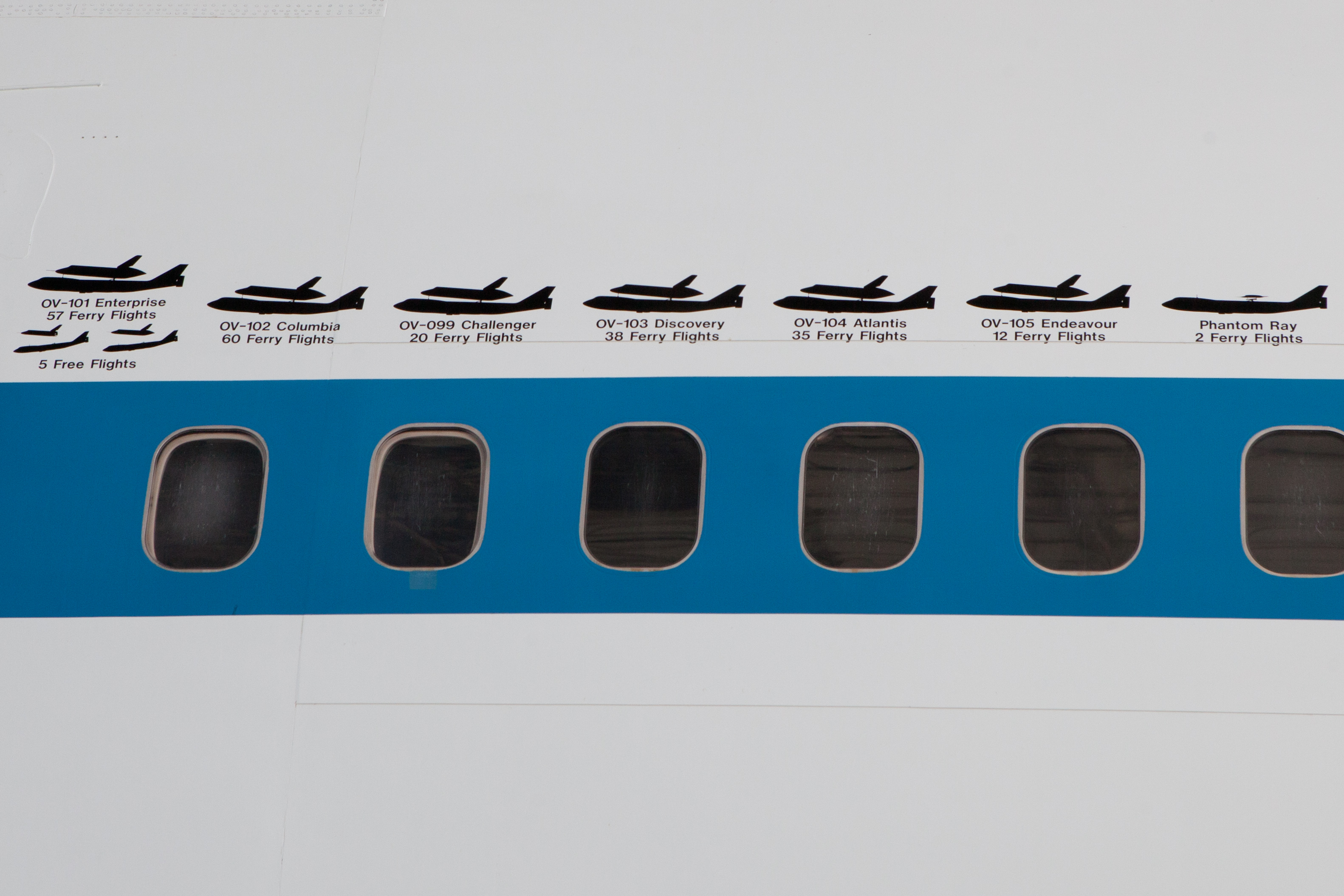
Silhouettes listing the number of ferry and free flights of the various Orbiters and the Phantom Ray on the port side of one of the SCAs

Shuttle Carrier Aircraft ferry flights generally originated at Edwards Air Force Base in California or on one occasion White Sands Space Harbor in New Mexico following missions which landed there, especially in the early days of the Space Shuttle program or when weather at the Shuttle Landing Facility (SLF) at Kennedy Space Center prevented ending missions there. Flights generally ended at the SLF. A number of flights began at Armstrong Flight Research Center following delivery of the orbiter from Rockwell International to NASA from the nearby facilities in Palmdale, California.

== Ferry Flights ==
- November 15, 1977 Enterprise, ferry flight test started and ended at the Armstrong Flight Research Center, lasted 3 hours, 21 minutes
- November 16, 1977 Enterprise, ferry flight test started and ended at the Armstrong Flight Research Center, lasted 4 hours, 17 minutes
- November 17, 1977 Enterprise, ferry flight test started and ended at the Armstrong Flight Research Center, lasted 4 hours, 13 minutes
- November 18, 1977 Enterprise, ferry flight test started and ended at the Armstrong Flight Research Center, lasted 3 hours, 37 minutes
- December 9, 1977 Enterprise, approach and landing flight tests Armstrong Flight Research Center, lasted 3 hours, 37 minutes
- March 10–13, 1978 Enterprise, ferry flight from Armstrong Flight Research Center to Marshall Space Flight Center (via Ellington Air Force Base) for vertical ground vibration tests at MSFC.
- April 10, 1979 Enterprise, ferry flight from Marshall Space Flight Center to Kennedy Space Center following vertical ground vibration tests at MSFC.
- August 10–16, 1979 Enterprise transported from Kennedy Space Center in Florida to Armstrong Flight Research Center in California (via Atlanta, St. Louis, Tulsa, Denver, Hill Air Force Base Utah, Vandenberg Air Force Base) following static tests at KSC

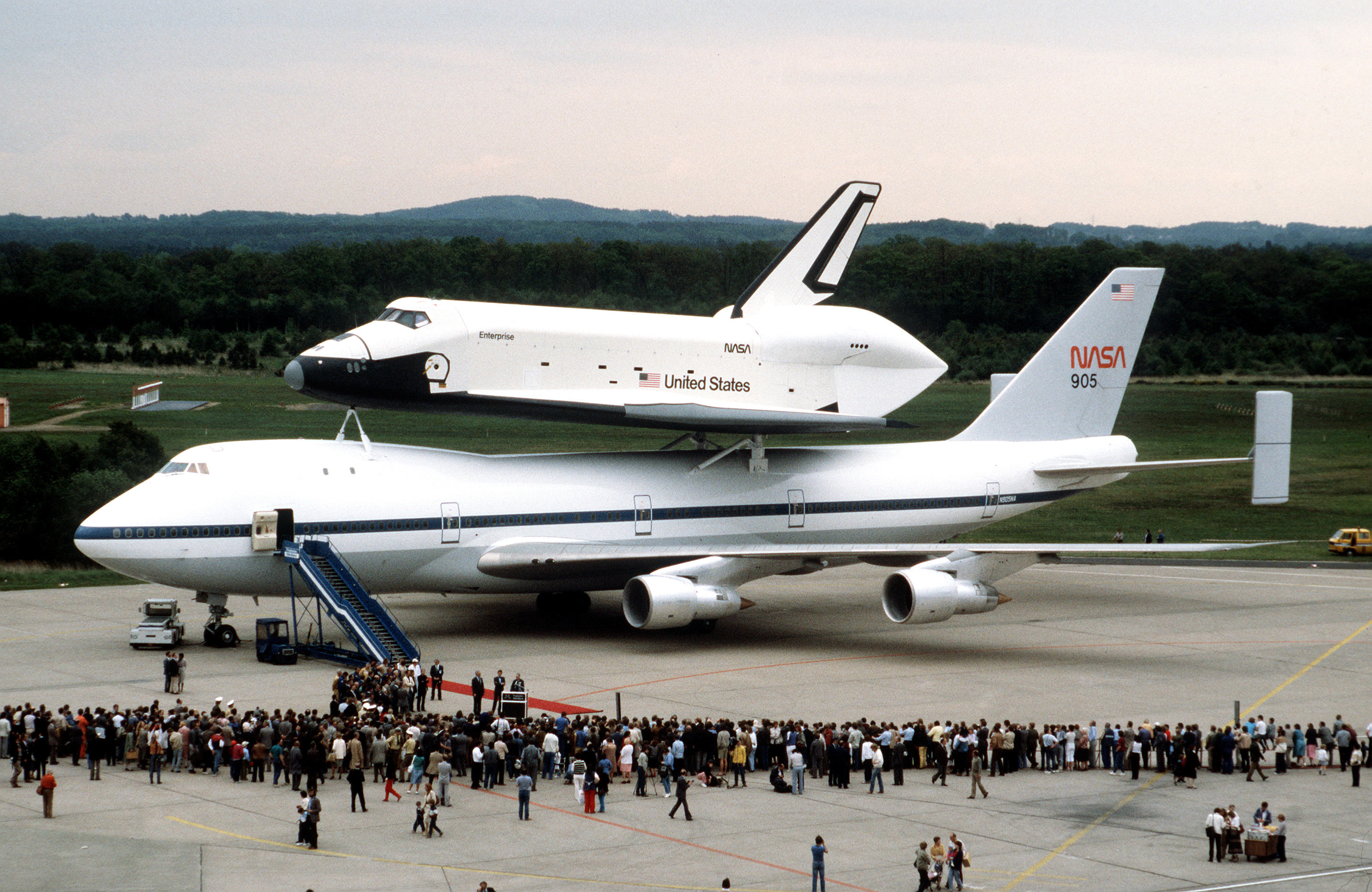
Spectators observe the arrival of the Space Shuttle Enterprise and its modified 747 transport aircraft at Cologne Bonn Airport, May 20, 1983.

- May 16-June 12, 1983 Enterprise, tour of the United States, Canada and Europe. From Edwards Air Force Base to Peterson Air Force Base, McConnell Air Force Base, Wright-Patterson Air Force Base, CFB Goose Bay, Keflavik Naval Air Station, RAF Fairford (20 May), Cologne Bonn Airport, Paris Air Show (arrived 24 May), Ciampino Airport, Stansted Airport, Ottawa International Airport, Scott Air Force Base and Sheppard Air Force Base.
- March 22–29, 1984 Enterprise, ferry flight from Edwards Air Force Base to Brookley Air Force Base (via Vandenberg Air Force Base) for overland and barge transport to the 1984 Louisiana World Exposition.
- November 10–13, 1984 Enterprise, ferry flight from Brookley Air Force Base to Edwards Air Force Base (via Kansas City) following the 1984 Louisiana World Exposition.
- November 10–13, 1984 Enterprise, ferry flight from Edwards Air Force Base to Vandenberg Air Force Base

Shuttle Carrier Aircraft flights excluding Enterprise
#	Mission	SCA	Orbiter	Leg count	Date	Leg
1	Delivery to KSC	905	Columbia (OV-102)	4	20/03/1979	Edwards AFB - Biggs Army Airfield
1	Delivery to KSC	905	Columbia (OV-102)	4	22/03/1979	Biggs Army Airfield - Kelly Field
1	Delivery to KSC	905	Columbia (OV-102)	4	23/03/1979	Kelly Field - Eglin AFB
1	Delivery to KSC	905	Columbia (OV-102)	4	24/03/1979	Eglin AFB - Shuttle Landing Facility, KSC
2	STS-1	905	Columbia (OV-102)	2	27/04/1981	Edwards AFB - Tinker AFB
2	STS-1	905	Columbia (OV-102)	2	28/04/1981	Tinker AFB - Shuttle Landing Facility, KSC
3	STS-2	905	Columbia (OV-102)	2	24/11/1981	Edwards AFB - Bergstrom AFB
3	STS-2	905	Columbia (OV-102)	2	25/11/1981	Bergstrom AFB - Shuttle Landing Facility, KSC
4	STS-3	905	Columbia (OV-102)	2	06/04/1982	White Sands Space Harbor - Barskdale AFB
4	STS-3	905	Columbia (OV-102)	2	06/04/1982	Barskdale AFB - Shuttle Landing Facility, KSC
5	Delivery to KSC	905	Challenger (OV-099)	2	04/07/1982	Edwards AFB - Ellington Field
5	Delivery to KSC	905	Challenger (OV-099)	2	05/07/1982	Ellington Field - Shuttle Landing Facility, KSC
6	STS-4	905	Columbia (OV-102)	2	14/07/1982	Edwards AFB - Dyess AFB
6	STS-4	905	Columbia (OV-102)	2	15/07/1982	Dyess AFB - Shuttle Landing Facility, KSC
7	STS-5	905	Columbia (OV-102)	2	21/11/1982	Edwards AFB - Kelly Field
7	STS-5	905	Columbia (OV-102)	2	22/11/1982	Kelly Field - Shuttle Landing Facility, KSC
8	STS-6	905	Challenger (OV-099)	2	14/04/1983	Edwards AFB - Kelly Field
8	STS-6	905	Challenger (OV-099)	2	14/04/1983	Kelly Field - Shuttle Landing Facility, KSC
9	STS-7	905	Challenger (OV-099)	2	28/06/1983	Edwards AFB - Kelly Field
9	STS-7	905	Challenger (OV-099)	2	29/06/1983	Kelly Field - Shuttle Landing Facility, KSC
10	STS-8	905	Challenger (OV-099)	2	09/09/1983	Edwards AFB - Sheppard AFB
10	STS-8	905	Challenger (OV-099)	2	09/09/1983	Sheppard AFB - Shuttle Landing Facility, KSC
11	Delivery to KSC	905	Discovery (OV-103)	3	06/11/1983	Edwards AFB - Vandenberg AFB
11	Delivery to KSC	905	Discovery (OV-103)	3	08/11/1983	Vandenberg AFB - Carswell AFB
11	Delivery to KSC	905	Discovery (OV-103)	3	09/11/1983	Carswell AFB - Shuttle Landing Facility, KSC
12	STS-9	905	Columbia (OV-102)	4	14/12/1983	Edwards AFB - Biggs Army Airfield
12	STS-9	905	Columbia (OV-102)	4	14/12/1983	Biggs Army Airfield - Kelly Field
12	STS-9	905	Columbia (OV-102)	4	15/12/1983	Kelly Field - Eglin AFB
12	STS-9	905	Columbia (OV-102)	4	15/12/1983	Eglin AFB - Shuttle Landing Facility, KSC
13	Mods	905	Columbia (OV-102)	2	26/01/1984	Shuttle Landing Facility, KSC - Kelly Field
13	Mods	905	Columbia (OV-102)	2	27/01/1984	Kelly Field - Edwards AFB
14	STS-41C	905	Challenger (OV-099)	2	17/04/1984	Edwards AFB - Kelly Field
14	STS-41C	905	Challenger (OV-099)	2	18/04/1984	Kelly Field - Shuttle Landing Facility, KSC
15	STS-41D	905	Discovery (OV-103)	2	09/09/1984	Edwards AFB - Altus AFB
15	STS-41D	905	Discovery (OV-103)	2	10/09/1984	Altus AFB - Shuttle Landing Facility, KSC
16	Delivery to KSC	905	Atlantis (OV-104)	2	12/04/1985	Edwards AFB - Ellington Field
16	Delivery to KSC	905	Atlantis (OV-104)	2	13/04/1985	Ellington Field - Shuttle Landing Facility, KSC
17	STS-51-B	905	Challenger (OV-099)	2	10/05/1985	Edwards AFB - Kelly Field
17	STS-51-B	905	Challenger (OV-099)	2	11/05/1985	Kelly Field - Shuttle Landing Facility, KSC
18	STS-51-G	905	Discovery (OV-103)	2	28/06/1985	Edwards AFB - Bergstrom AFB
18	STS-51-G	905	Discovery (OV-103)	2	28/06/1985	Bergstrom AFB - Shuttle Landing Facility, KSC
19	Mods	905	Columbia (OV-102)	2	14/07/1985	Edwards AFB - Offut AFB
19	Mods	905	Columbia (OV-102)	2	14/07/1985	Offut AFB - Shuttle Landing Facility, KSC
20	STS-51-F	905	Challenger (OV-099)	4	10/08/1985	Edwards AFB - Davis-Monthan AFB
20	STS-51-F	905	Challenger (OV-099)	4	10/08/1985	Davis-Monthan AFB - Kelly Field
20	STS-51-F	905	Challenger (OV-099)	4	11/08/1985	Kelly Field - Eglin AFB
20	STS-51-F	905	Challenger (OV-099)	4	11/08/1985	Eglin AFB - Shuttle Landing Facility, KSC
21	STS-51-I	905	Discovery (OV-103)	2	07/09/1985	Edwards AFB - Kelly Field
21	STS-51-I	905	Discovery (OV-103)	2	08/09/1985	Kelly Field - Shuttle Landing Facility, KSC
22	STS-51-J	905	Atlantis (OV-104)	2	11/10/1985	Edwards AFB - Kelly Field
22	STS-51-J	905	Atlantis (OV-104)	2	11/10/1985	Kelly Field - Shuttle Landing Facility, KSC
23	STS-61-A	905	Challenger (OV-099)	4	10/11/1985	Edwards AFB - Davis-Monthan AFB
23	STS-61-A	905	Challenger (OV-099)	4	10/11/1985	Davis-Monthan AFB - Kelly Field
23	STS-61-A	905	Challenger (OV-099)	4	11/11/1985	Kelly Field - Eglin AFB
23	STS-61-A	905	Challenger (OV-099)	4	11/11/1985	Eglin AFB - Shuttle Landing Facility, KSC
24	STS-61-B	905	Atlantis (OV-104)	2	07/12/1985	Edwards AFB - Kelly Field
24	STS-61-B	905	Atlantis (OV-104)	2	07/12/1985	Kelly Field - Shuttle Landing Facility, KSC
25	STS-61-C	905	Columbia (OV-102)	4	22/01/1986	Edwards AFB - Davis-Monthan AFB
25	STS-61-C	905	Columbia (OV-102)	4	22/01/1986	Davis-Monthan AFB - Kelly Field
25	STS-61-C	905	Columbia (OV-102)	4	23/01/1986	Kelly Field - Eglin AFB
25	STS-61-C	905	Columbia (OV-102)	4	23/01/1986	Eglin AFB - Shuttle Landing Facility, KSC
26	STS-26	905	Discovery (OV-103)	2	08/10/1988	Edwards AFB - Kelly Field
26	STS-26	905	Discovery (OV-103)	2	08/10/1988	Kelly Field - Shuttle Landing Facility, KSC
27	STS-27	905	Atlantis (OV-104)	3	11/12/1988	Edwards AFB - Davis-Monthan AFB
27	STS-27	905	Atlantis (OV-104)	3	12/12/1988	Davis-Monthan AFB - Kelly Field
27	STS-27	905	Atlantis (OV-104)	3	13/12/1988	Kelly Field - Shuttle Landing Facility, KSC
28	STS-29	905	Discovery (OV-103)	2	23/03/1989	Edwards AFB - Kelly Field
28	STS-29	905	Discovery (OV-103)	2	24/03/1989	Kelly Field - Shuttle Landing Facility, KSC
29	STS-30	905	Atlantis (OV-104)	4	13/05/1989	Edwards AFB - Biggs Army Airfield
29	STS-30	905	Atlantis (OV-104)	4	15/05/1989	Biggs Army Airfield - Dallas Fort Worth
29	STS-30	905	Atlantis (OV-104)	4	15/05/1989	Dallas Fort Worth - Robins AFB
29	STS-30	905	Atlantis (OV-104)	4	15/05/1989	Robins AFB - Shuttle Landing Facility, KSC
30	STS-28	905	Columbia (OV-102)	4	18/08/1989	Edwards AFB - Edwards AFB
30	STS-28	905	Columbia (OV-102)	4	20/08/1989	Edwards AFB - Sheppard AFB
30	STS-28	905	Columbia (OV-102)	4	20/08/1989	Sheppard AFB - Robins AFB
30	STS-28	905	Columbia (OV-102)	4	21/08/1989	Robins AFB - Shuttle Landing Facility, KSC
31	STS-34	905	Atlantis (OV-104)	3	28/10/1989	Edwards AFB - Biggs Army Airfield
31	STS-34	905	Atlantis (OV-104)	3	28/10/1989	Biggs Army Airfield - Columbus AFB
31	STS-34	905	Atlantis (OV-104)	3	29/10/1989	Columbus AFB - Shuttle Landing Facility, KSC
32	STS-33	905	Discovery (OV-103)	4	02/12/1989	Edwards AFB - Edwards AFB
32	STS-33	905	Discovery (OV-103)	4	03/12/1989	Edwards AFB - Kelly Field
32	STS-33	905	Discovery (OV-103)	4	03/12/1989	Kelly Field - Eglin AFB
32	STS-33	905	Discovery (OV-103)	4	04/12/1989	Eglin AFB - Shuttle Landing Facility, KSC
33	STS-32	905	Columbia (OV-102)	3	25/01/1990	Edwards AFB - Davis-Monthan AFB
33	STS-32	905	Columbia (OV-102)	3	25/01/1990	Davis-Monthan AFB - Kelly Field
33	STS-32	905	Columbia (OV-102)	3	26/01/1990	Kelly Field - Shuttle Landing Facility, KSC
34	STS-36	905	Atlantis (OV-104)	4	10/03/1990	Edwards AFB - Edwards AFB
34	STS-36	905	Atlantis (OV-104)	4	11/03/1990	Edwards AFB - Biggs Army Airfield
34	STS-36	905	Atlantis (OV-104)	4	13/03/1990	Biggs Army Airfield - Columbus AFB
34	STS-36	905	Atlantis (OV-104)	4	13/03/1990	Columbus AFB - Shuttle Landing Facility, KSC
35	STS-31	905	Discovery (OV-103)	3	05/05/1990	Edwards AFB - Sheppard AFB
35	STS-31	905	Discovery (OV-103)	3	06/05/1990	Sheppard AFB - Robins AFB
35	STS-31	905	Discovery (OV-103)	3	07/05/1990	Robins AFB - Shuttle Landing Facility, KSC
36	STS-41	905	Discovery (OV-103)	3	15/10/1990	Edwards AFB - Sheppard AFB
36	STS-41	905	Discovery (OV-103)	3	15/10/1990	Sheppard AFB - Eglin AFB
36	STS-41	905	Discovery (OV-103)	3	16/10/1990	Eglin AFB - Shuttle Landing Facility, KSC
37	STS-35	905	Columbia (OV-102)	5	16/12/1990	Edwards AFB - Edwards AFB
37	STS-35	905	Columbia (OV-102)	5	18/12/1990	Edwards AFB - Biggs Army Airfield
37	STS-35	905	Columbia (OV-102)	5	18/12/1990	Biggs Army Airfield - Kelly Field
37	STS-35	905	Columbia (OV-102)	5	19/12/1990	Kelly Field - Barskdale AFB
37	STS-35	905	Columbia (OV-102)	5	21/12/1990	Barskdale AFB - Shuttle Landing Facility, KSC
38	STS-37	905	Atlantis (OV-104)	4	16/04/1991	Edwards AFB - Kelly Field
38	STS-37	905	Atlantis (OV-104)	4	16/04/1991	Kelly Field - Columbus AFB
38	STS-37	905	Atlantis (OV-104)	4	17/04/1991	Columbus AFB - McDill AFB
38	STS-37	905	Atlantis (OV-104)	4	18/04/1991	McDill AFB - Shuttle Landing Facility, KSC
39	Delivery to KSC	911	Endeavour (OV-105)	6	02/05/1991	Plant 42, Palmdale - Plant 42, Palmdale
39	Delivery to KSC	911	Endeavour (OV-105)	6	03/05/1991	Plant 42, Palmdale - Biggs Army Airfield
39	Delivery to KSC	911	Endeavour (OV-105)	6	05/05/1991	Biggs Army Airfield - Kelly Field
39	Delivery to KSC	911	Endeavour (OV-105)	6	06/05/1991	Kelly Field - Ellington Field
39	Delivery to KSC	911	Endeavour (OV-105)	6	06/05/1991	Ellington Field - Columbus AFB
39	Delivery to KSC	911	Endeavour (OV-105)	6	07/05/1991	Columbus AFB - Shuttle Landing Facility, KSC
40	STS-40	905	Columbia (OV-102)	4	19/06/1991	Edwards AFB - Biggs Army Airfield
40	STS-40	905	Columbia (OV-102)	4	20/06/1991	Biggs Army Airfield - Kelly Field
40	STS-40	905	Columbia (OV-102)	4	20/06/1991	Kelly Field - Columbus AFB
40	STS-40	905	Columbia (OV-102)	4	21/06/1991	Columbus AFB - Shuttle Landing Facility, KSC
41	OMDP	911	Columbia (OV-102)	4	09/08/1991	Shuttle Landing Facility, KSC - Shuttle Landing Facility, KSC
41	OMDP	911	Columbia (OV-102)	4	10/08/1991	Shuttle Landing Facility, KSC - McDill AFB
41	OMDP	911	Columbia (OV-102)	4	12/08/1991	McDill AFB - Kelly Field
41	OMDP	911	Columbia (OV-102)	4	13/08/1991	Kelly Field - Plant 42, Palmdale
42	STS-48	911	Discovery (OV-103)	4	24/09/1991	Edwards AFB - Biggs Army Airfield
42	STS-48	911	Discovery (OV-103)	4	24/09/1991	Biggs Army Airfield - Tinker AFB
42	STS-48	911	Discovery (OV-103)	4	25/09/1991	Tinker AFB - Columbus AFB
42	STS-48	911	Discovery (OV-103)	4	26/09/1991	Columbus AFB - Shuttle Landing Facility, KSC
43	STS-44	911	Atlantis (OV-104)	2	07/12/1991	Edwards AFB - Sheppard AFB
43	STS-44	911	Atlantis (OV-104)	2	08/12/1991	Sheppard AFB - Shuttle Landing Facility, KSC
44	OMDP	905	Columbia (OV-102)	3	07/02/1992	Plant 42, Palmdale - Plant 42, Palmdale
44	OMDP	905	Columbia (OV-102)	3	09/02/1992	Plant 42, Palmdale - Kelly Field
44	OMDP	905	Columbia (OV-102)	3	09/02/1992	Kelly Field - Shuttle Landing Facility, KSC
45	STS-42	905	Discovery (OV-103)	5	11/02/1992	Edwards AFB - Edwards AFB
45	STS-42	905	Discovery (OV-103)	5	14/02/1992	Edwards AFB - Biggs Army Airfield
45	STS-42	905	Discovery (OV-103)	5	15/02/1992	Biggs Army Airfield - Columbus AFB
45	STS-42	905	Discovery (OV-103)	5	16/02/1992	Kelly Field - Columbus AFB
45	STS-42	905	Discovery (OV-103)	5	16/02/1992	Columbus AFB - Shuttle Landing Facility, KSC
46	STS-49	911	Endeavour (OV-105)	4	21/05/1992	Edwards AFB - Edwards AFB
46	STS-49	911	Endeavour (OV-105)	4	27/05/1992	Edwards AFB - Biggs Army Airfield
46	STS-49	911	Endeavour (OV-105)	4	29/05/1992	Biggs Army Airfield - Kelly Field
46	STS-49	911	Endeavour (OV-105)	4	30/05/1992	Kelly Field - Shuttle Landing Facility, KSC
47	OMDP	911	Atlantis (OV-104)	3	18/10/1992	Shuttle Landing Facility, KSC - Gregg County
47	OMDP	911	Atlantis (OV-104)	3	18/10/1992	Gregg County - Biggs Army Airfield
47	OMDP	911	Atlantis (OV-104)	3	18/10/1992	Biggs Army Airfield - Plant 42, Palmdale
48	STS-53	911	Discovery (OV-103)	3	15/12/1992	Edwards AFB - Kelly Field
48	STS-53	911	Discovery (OV-103)	3	18/12/1992	Kelly Field - Eglin AFB
48	STS-53	911	Discovery (OV-103)	3	18/12/1992	Eglin AFB - Shuttle Landing Facility, KSC
49	STS-55	905	Columbia (OV-102)	4	11/05/1993	Edwards AFB - Biggs Army Airfield
49	STS-55	905	Columbia (OV-102)	4	12/05/1993	Biggs Army Airfield - Kelly Field
49	STS-55	905	Columbia (OV-102)	4	12/05/1993	Kelly Field - Columbus AFB
49	STS-55	905	Columbia (OV-102)	4	14/05/1993	Columbus AFB - Shuttle Landing Facility, KSC
50	STS-58	911	Columbia (OV-102)	4	07/11/1993	Edwards AFB - Biggs Army Airfield
50	STS-58	911	Columbia (OV-102)	4	07/11/1993	Biggs Army Airfield - Kelly Field
50	STS-58	911	Columbia (OV-102)	4	07/11/1993	Kelly Field - Columbus AFB
50	STS-58	911	Columbia (OV-102)	4	08/11/1993	Columbus AFB - Shuttle Landing Facility, KSC
51	STS-59	911	Endeavour (OV-105)	4	26/04/1994	Edwards AFB - Edwards AFB
51	STS-59	911	Endeavour (OV-105)	4	30/04/1994	Edwards AFB - El Paso
51	STS-59	911	Endeavour (OV-105)	4	01/05/1994	El Paso - Little Rock AFB
51	STS-59	911	Endeavour (OV-105)	4	03/05/1994	Little Rock AFB - Shuttle Landing Facility, KSC
52	OMDP	911	Atlantis (OV-104)	4	27/05/1994	Plant 42, Palmdale - Biggs Army Airfield
52	OMDP	911	Atlantis (OV-104)	4	28/05/1994	Biggs Army Airfield - Columbus AFB
52	OMDP	911	Atlantis (OV-104)	4	28/05/1994	Columbus AFB - Robins AFB
52	OMDP	911	Atlantis (OV-104)	4	29/05/1994	Robins AFB - Shuttle Landing Facility, KSC
53	STS-64	905	Discovery (OV-103)	2	26/09/1994	Edwards AFB - Kelly Field
53	STS-64	905	Discovery (OV-103)	2	27/09/1994	Kelly Field - Shuttle Landing Facility, KSC
54	OMDP	905	Columbia (OV-102)	4	08/10/1994	Shuttle Landing Facility, KSC - Huntsville
54	OMDP	905	Columbia (OV-102)	4	10/10/1994	Huntsville - Ellington Field
54	OMDP	905	Columbia (OV-102)	4	11/10/1994	Ellington Field - Biggs Army Airfield
54	OMDP	905	Columbia (OV-102)	4	11/10/1994	Biggs Army Airfield - Plant 42, Palmdale
55	STS-68	911	Endeavour (OV-105)	4	19/10/1994	Edwards AFB - Biggs Army Airfield
55	STS-68	911	Endeavour (OV-105)	4	19/10/1994	Biggs Army Airfield - Dyess AFB
55	STS-68	911	Endeavour (OV-105)	4	20/10/1994	Dyess AFB - Eglin AFB
55	STS-68	911	Endeavour (OV-105)	4	20/10/1994	Eglin AFB - Shuttle Landing Facility, KSC
56	STS-66	911	Atlantis (OV-104)	3	21/11/1994	Edwards AFB - Kelly Field
56	STS-66	911	Atlantis (OV-104)	3	21/11/1994	Kelly Field - Eglin AFB
56	STS-66	911	Atlantis (OV-104)	3	22/11/1994	Eglin AFB - Shuttle Landing Facility, KSC
57	STS-67	905	Endeavour (OV-105)	3	26/03/1995	Edwards AFB - Dyess AFB
57	STS-67	905	Endeavour (OV-105)	3	27/03/1995	Dyess AFB - Columbus AFB
57	STS-67	905	Endeavour (OV-105)	3	27/03/1995	Columbus AFB - Shuttle Landing Facility, KSC
58	OMDP	905	Columbia (OV-102)	2	11/04/1995	Plant 42, Palmdale - Ellington Field
58	OMDP	905	Columbia (OV-102)	2	14/04/1995	Ellington Field - Shuttle Landing Facility, KSC
59	OMDP	905	Discovery (OV-103)	3	27/09/1995	Shuttle Landing Facility, KSC - NASJRB Fort Worth
59	OMDP	905	Discovery (OV-103)	3	27/09/1995	NASJRB Fort Worth - Salt Lake City
59	OMDP	905	Discovery (OV-103)	3	28/09/1995	Salt Lake City - Plant 42, Palmdale
60	STS-76	905	Atlantis (OV-104)	5	06/04/1996	Edwards AFB - Edwards AFB
60	STS-76	905	Atlantis (OV-104)	5	11/04/1996	Edwards AFB - Davis-Monthan AFB
60	STS-76	905	Atlantis (OV-104)	5	11/04/1996	Davis-Monthan AFB - Dyess AFB
60	STS-76	905	Atlantis (OV-104)	5	12/04/1996	Dyess AFB - Eglin AFB
60	STS-76	905	Atlantis (OV-104)	5	12/04/1996	Eglin AFB - Shuttle Landing Facility, KSC
61	OMDP	911	Discovery (OV-103)	4	25/06/1996	Plant 42, Palmdale - Plant 42, Palmdale
61	OMDP	911	Discovery (OV-103)	4	28/06/1996	Plant 42, Palmdale - Altus AFB
61	OMDP	911	Discovery (OV-103)	4	28/06/1996	Altus AFB - Robins AFB
61	OMDP	911	Discovery (OV-103)	4	29/06/1996	Robins AFB - Shuttle Landing Facility, KSC
62	OMDP	911	Endeavour (OV-105)	2	30/07/1996	Shuttle Landing Facility, KSC - Kelly Field
62	OMDP	911	Endeavour (OV-105)	2	30/07/1996	Kelly Field - Plant 42, Palmdale
63	OMDP	905	Endeavour (OV-105)	4	25/03/1997	Plant 42, Palmdale - Plant 42, Palmdale
63	OMDP	905	Endeavour (OV-105)	4	26/03/1997	Plant 42, Palmdale - NASJRB Fort Worth
63	OMDP	905	Endeavour (OV-105)	4	26/03/1997	NASJRB Fort Worth - Robins AFB
63	OMDP	905	Endeavour (OV-105)	4	27/03/1997	Robins AFB - Shuttle Landing Facility, KSC
64	OMDP	911	Atlantis (OV-104)	2	11/11/1997	Shuttle Landing Facility, KSC - Tinker AFB
64	OMDP	911	Atlantis (OV-104)	2	14/11/1997	Tinker AFB - Plant 42, Palmdale
65	OMDP	905	Atlantis (OV-104)	4	22/09/1998	Plant 42, Palmdale - Plant 42, Palmdale
65	OMDP	905	Atlantis (OV-104)	4	23/09/1998	Plant 42, Palmdale - Robert Gray Army Airfield
65	OMDP	905	Atlantis (OV-104)	4	23/09/1998	Robert Gray Army Airfield - Campbell Army Airfield
65	OMDP	905	Atlantis (OV-104)	4	27/09/1998	Campbell Army Airfield - Shuttle Landing Facility, KSC
66	OMM	905	Columbia (OV-102)	2	24/09/1999	Shuttle Landing Facility, KSC - Whiteman AFB
66	OMM	905	Columbia (OV-102)	2	25/09/1999	Whiteman AFB - Plant 42, Palmdale
67	STS-92	905	Discovery (OV-103)	3	02/11/2000	Edwards AFB - Altus AFB
67	STS-92	905	Discovery (OV-103)	3	02/11/2000	Altus AFB - Whiteman AFB
67	STS-92	905	Discovery (OV-103)	3	03/11/2000	Whiteman AFB - Shuttle Landing Facility, KSC
68	OMM	905	Columbia (OV-102)	3	01/03/2001	Plant 42, Palmdale - Dyess AFB
68	OMM	905	Columbia (OV-102)	3	04/03/2001	Dyess AFB - Cape Canaveral AFS
68	OMM	905	Columbia (OV-102)	3	05/03/2001	Cape Canaveral AFS - Shuttle Landing Facility, KSC
69	STS-98	911	Atlantis (OV-104)	4	01/03/2001	Edwards AFB - Altus AFB
69	STS-98	911	Atlantis (OV-104)	4	03/03/2001	Altus AFB - Barskdale AFB
69	STS-98	911	Atlantis (OV-104)	4	03/03/2001	Barskdale AFB - Eglin AFB
69	STS-98	911	Atlantis (OV-104)	4	04/03/2001	Eglin AFB - Shuttle Landing Facility, KSC
70	STS-100	905	Endeavour (OV-105)	3	08/05/2001	Edwards AFB - Altus AFB
70	STS-100	905	Endeavour (OV-105)	3	08/05/2001	Altus AFB - Little Rock AFB
70	STS-100	905	Endeavour (OV-105)	3	09/05/2001	Little Rock AFB - Shuttle Landing Facility, KSC
71	STS-111	911	Endeavour (OV-105)	3	28/06/2002	Edwards AFB - Altus AFB
71	STS-111	911	Endeavour (OV-105)	3	28/06/2002	Altus AFB - Whiteman AFB
71	STS-111	911	Endeavour (OV-105)	3	29/06/2002	Whiteman AFB - Shuttle Landing Facility, KSC
72	STS-114	905	Discovery (OV-103)	3	19/08/2005	Edwards AFB - Altus AFB
72	STS-114	905	Discovery (OV-103)	3	19/08/2005	Altus AFB - Barskdale AFB
72	STS-114	905	Discovery (OV-103)	3	21/08/2005	Barskdale AFB - Shuttle Landing Facility, KSC
73	STS-117	905	Atlantis (OV-104)	4	01/07/2007	Edwards AFB - Amarillo
73	STS-117	905	Atlantis (OV-104)	4	01/07/2007	Amarillo - Offut AFB
73	STS-117	905	Atlantis (OV-104)	4	02/07/2007	Offut AFB - Campbell Army Airfield
73	STS-117	905	Atlantis (OV-104)	4	03/07/2007	Campbell Army Airfield - Shuttle Landing Facility, KSC
74	STS-126	911	Endeavour (OV-105)	4	10/12/2008	Edwards AFB - Biggs Army Airfield
74	STS-126	911	Endeavour (OV-105)	4	10/12/2008	Biggs Army Airfield - NASJRB Fort Worth
74	STS-126	911	Endeavour (OV-105)	4	11/12/2008	NASJRB Fort Worth - Barskdale AFB
74	STS-126	911	Endeavour (OV-105)	4	12/12/2008	Barskdale AFB - Shuttle Landing Facility, KSC
75	STS-125	911	Atlantis (OV-104)	4	01/06/2009	Edwards AFB - Biggs Army Airfield
75	STS-125	911	Atlantis (OV-104)	4	02/06/2009	Biggs Army Airfield - Kelly Field
75	STS-125	911	Atlantis (OV-104)	4	02/06/2009	Kelly Field - Columbus AFB
75	STS-125	911	Atlantis (OV-104)	4	02/06/2009	Columbus AFB - Shuttle Landing Facility, KSC
76	STS-128	911	Discovery (OV-103)	4	20/09/2009	Edwards AFB - Amarillo
76	STS-128	911	Discovery (OV-103)	4	20/09/2009	Amarillo - NASJRB Fort Worth
76	STS-128	911	Discovery (OV-103)	4	20/09/2009	NASJRB Fort Worth - Barskdale AFB
76	STS-128	911	Discovery (OV-103)	4	21/09/2009	Barskdale AFB - Shuttle Landing Facility, KSC

== Other transportation methods ==
=== Overland ===
Space shuttle orbiters were constructed in Palmdale, California and transported overland to the Armstrong Flight Research Center (AFRC), a distance of 36 miles. The shuttle carrier aircraft was not used for this initial leg of the journey but was used to transport the orbiters to the Kennedy Space Center in Florida. Additionally the orbiters were routinely towed from the Shuttle Landing Facility to the Orbiter Processing Facility after landing at the Kennedy Space Center either after missions or after removal from the SCA.

- Enterprise January 31, 1977 (Palmdale to DFRC) for ferry flight to KSC
- Columbia March 8, 1979 (Palmdale to DFRC) for ferry flight to KSC
- Enterprise October 30, 1979 (DFRC to Palmdale) for ferry flight to KSC
- Challenger July 1, 1982 (Palmdale to DFRC) for ferry flight to KSC
- Discovery November 5, 1983 (Palmdale to DFRC) for ferry flight to KSC
- Columbia January 30, 1984 (DFRC to Palmdale) for STS-17 modifications
- Enterprise April 2, 1984 (Brookley Air Force Base, Mobile Alabama to U.S. Coast Guard Station, Mobile Alabama), for transfer to a barge for transport to New Orleans for the 1984 Louisiana World Exposition
- Atlantis April 9, 1985 (Palmdale to DFRC) for ferry flight to KSC
- Columbia July 11, 1985 (Palmdale to DFRC) for ferry flight to KSC, following modifications
- Endeavour October 12–14, 2012 (LAX to California Science Center), for display

=== Barge ===
- Enterprise April 3–5, 1984 (U.S. Coast Guard Station, Mobile Alabama to New Orleans), for the 1984 Louisiana World Exposition
- Enterprise November 3–5, 1984 (New Orleans to U.S. Coast Guard Station, Mobile Alabama), following the 1984 Louisiana World Exposition
