= Houston Spaceport =

Spaceport in Houston, Texas

Coordinates: 29.6041056°N 95.1758806°W

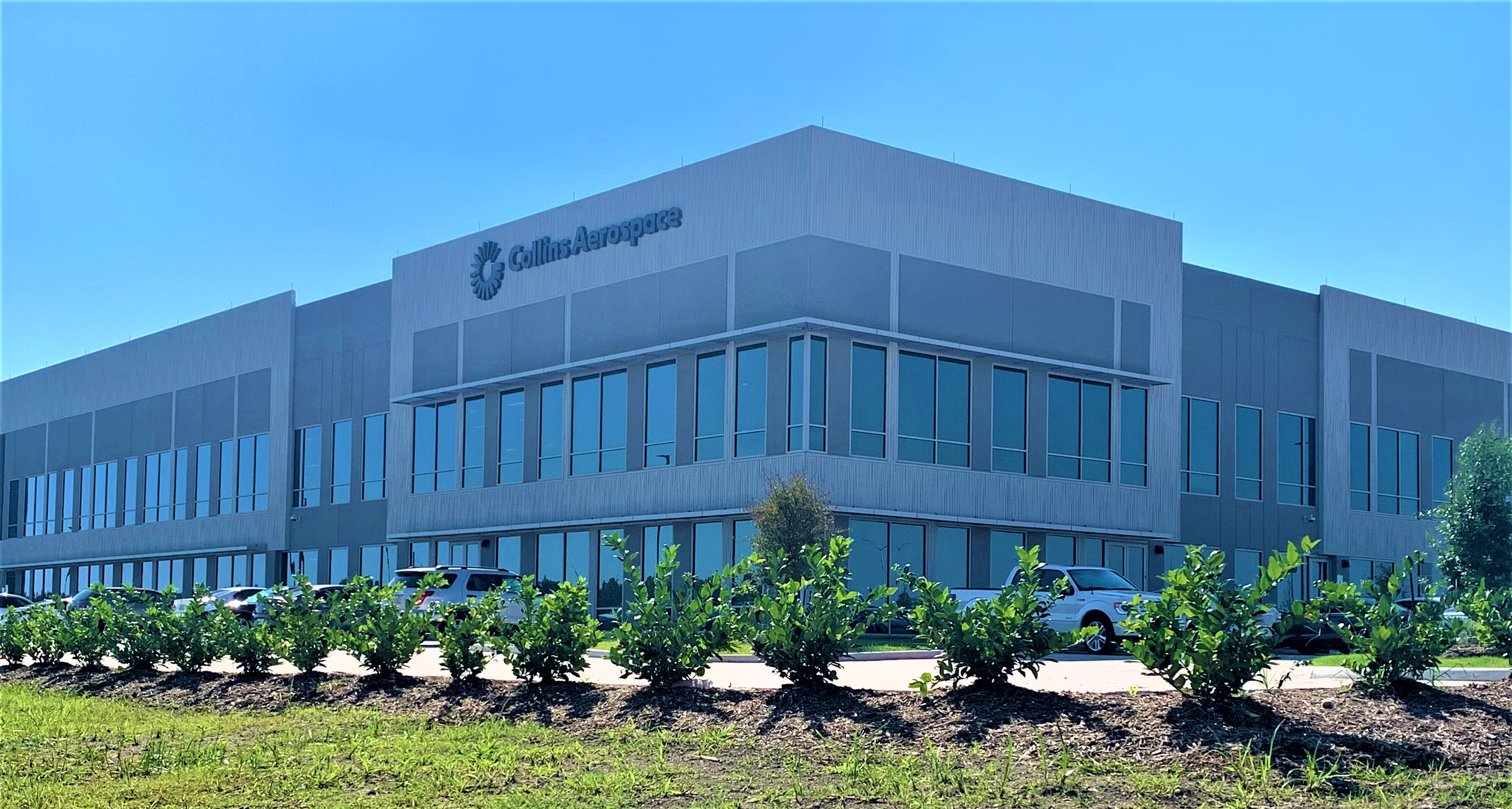
Collins Aerospace's 120.000 sq ft facility at the Houston Spaceport.

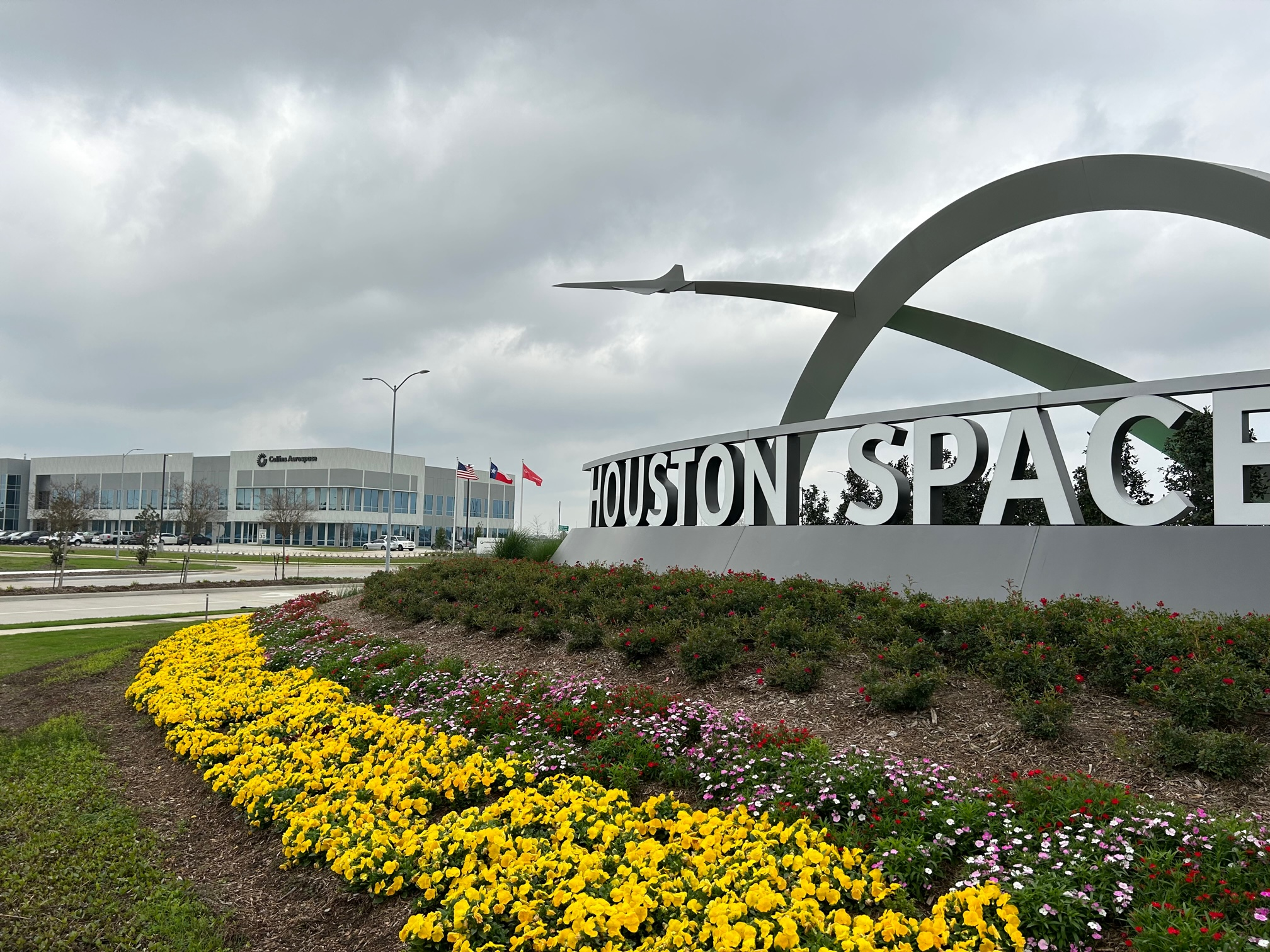
The main entrance of the Houston Spaceport from Space Center Blvd.

The Houston Spaceport is a federally licensed commercial spaceport located in Houston, Texas, United States. Situated on 400 acres (160 ha) at Ellington Airport (EFD), the spaceport is managed by the Houston Airport System, a department of the City of Houston. It was established in 2015 to act as a hub for commercial aerospace and aviation companies, and as a center for research, development, fabrication and education. The Houston Spaceport is FAA-licensed as a launch and landing site for suborbital, reusable launch vehicles. It is the 10th commercial spaceport in the United States to receive a federal license for spaceflight.

As of 2024, current activities at the Houston Spaceport include:

- Lunar exploration activities in support of NASA's Commercial Lunar Payload Services program
- Hypersonic spacecraft development and engine testing
- Space station fabrication and assembly
- Space/planetary research and education
- Development and testing of next-generation spacesuits
- Developing and manufacturing habitation environment systems for government and commercial space vehicles
- Aerospace and aviation training

== History ==
The Houston Airport System began initial discussions about establishing a spaceport in Houston in 2011. In 2013, the Houston City Council approved a feasibility study to determine the possibility of obtaining a spaceport launch site operator’s license at Ellington Airport. The results of the study green lit the Houston Spaceport's efforts to become the (then) ninth federally licensed commercial spaceport in the US.

In 2014 the Houston Spaceport signed a letter of intent with the Sierra Nevada Corporation to explore the possibilities of the proposed Houston Spaceport as a potential landing site for SNC's Dreamchaser spacecraft.

On June 30, 2015, Houston Airport System was granted a launch site license from the Federal Aviation Administration establishing the Houston Spaceport as the tenth commercial spaceport in the United States. 400 acres of greenfield space on the northeast corner of Ellington Airport were allocated for spaceport development.

In October of the same year, NASA and HAS formally entered a development agreement to provide NASA expertise and training at the Houston Spaceport.

=== Phase 1 ===
The following month, on November 4, 2015, the Houston Spaceport purchased Boeing's Houston Product Support Center, (an aerospace engineering building used to process payloads for the International Space Station) and 4.30 acres of land directly adjacent to the existing Houston Spaceport property. Subsequently renamed the Houston Aerospace Support Center (HASC), the building contains clean rooms, laboratories and heavy lift cranes to support vehicle processing and assembly for Houston Spaceport tenants. Purchase of the building marked the functional beginning of the Houston Spaceport, and Intuitive Machines became the spaceport's first commercial tenant when they moved into the HASC in August, 2016.

In 2018, HAS constructed a $12.4 million air traffic control tower EFD with a dedicated mission control for the Houston Spaceport's commercial spaceflight activities. The 143-ft tower replaced the original tower, which was built in 1955 and suffered extensive damage during Hurricane Ike.

=== Phase 1 Expansion ===
On October 17, 2018, the Houston City Council approved $18.8 million in funding for infrastructure development at the Spaceport. This marked the beginning of a large, multi-phase expansion project. officially known as the "Phase 1 Expansion." The expansion provided infrastructure to 153 acres of the Houston Spaceport property closest to the HASC. This included: streets, water/ wastewater, pipelines, electrical power and communications facilities. The infrastructure development project was completed in 2019 and included four new streets named after five of the Orbiters from the Space Shuttle Program: Columbia, Atlantis, Enterprise, Endeavour, and Discovery.

San Jacinto College opened the EDGE Center at the Houston Spaceport in 2020. Housed inside the HASC, the EDGE Center offers aerospace training and programs.

In September 2021, Houston City Council voted to raise the status of the Houston Spaceport to a local government corporation - called the Houston Spaceport Development Corporation - to allow the spaceport to utilize state funding for infrastructure development under the Texas Spaceport Trust Fund.

Also in 2021, Venus Aerospace relocated from Silicon Valley to a 30,000 square foot headquarters at the Houston Spaceport in order to develop their hypersonic Stargazer spacecraft and perform engine testing.

Another aerospace company, RAVN Aerospace, relocated their headquarters to the Houston Spaceport from Silicon Valley the following year.

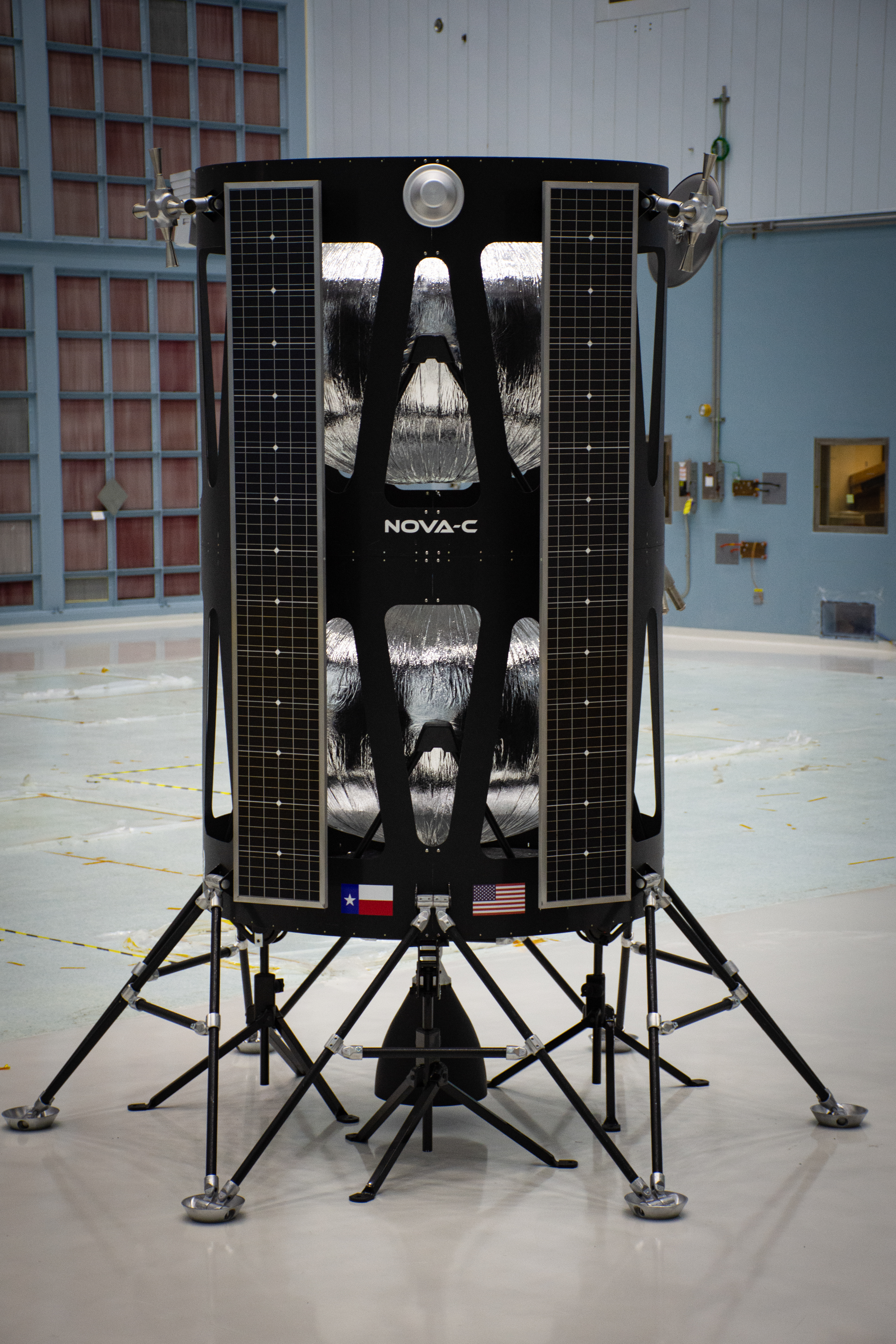
Intuitive Machines' Nova C lunar lander, developed at the Houston Spaceport.

In 2022, Collins Aerospace finished construction of an 8 acre, 120,000 square foot campus at the Spaceport to support the development and testing of space systems, including the next-generation spacesuit. The campus includes a 10,000 square foot spaceflight incubator space.

In April 2023, the Lone Star Flight Museum opened a permanent exhibit entitled "Space Gallery, that features the NASA Crew Compartment Trainer-2, the EVA Airlock System, the Space Shuttle Motion Base Simulator, a rover and other NASA artifacts.

In September 2023, Intuitive Machines moved from the HASC into their newly-constructed $40 million Lunar Operations Center (LOC) on 12.5 acres of the Phase 1 Expansion. The LOC covers 125,000 square feet of office and production space for the manufacturing of lunar landers and spacecraft. The center also includes mission control rooms to track and manage lunar missions, a propulsion test facility and a 3,800 square foot "flame range."

In December 2023, Axiom Space opened its Assembly Integration and Test Building on their new 22-acre campus at the Houston Spaceport. The building serves as Axiom's new world headquarters and includes employee offices, astronaut training facilities and mission control, testing labs and a high bay production facility for the construction of space station modules for Axiom Station.

The same month, Texas Southern University (TSU) broke ground on their new two-acre aerospace training facility at the Houston Spaceport. Once complete, TSU plans to move their Aviation Management programs to the facility.

=== Phase 2 ===
In October 2022, the Houston Spaceport completed a Phase 2 land use plan for the development of the remaining 257 acres of the Spaceport. Phase 2 will include retail and hotels components at the spaceport, as well as expanded infrastructure to accommodate expanded land use by commercial space and education tenants. Additionally, several major infrastructure upgrades are included in Phase 2, including the construction of Taxiway Lima: a full-length taxiway over 8,000 feet long, alongside Runway 4-22. Taxiway Lima will create an additional 120 acres for airside development and operationally connect the Houston Spaceport to Ellington Airport.

== Current tenants ==
- Axiom Space
- Intuitive Machines
- San Jacinto College EDGE Center
- Collins Aerospace/Raytheon
- Venus Aerospace
- RAVN Aerospace
- Northrup Rice
- Texas Southern University
- NASA
- Stellar Access

== Spaceport milestones ==
- October 2022: Venus Aerospace becomes the first company in the world to get room temperature storable liquid fuels to operate in a Rotating Detonation Rocket Engine.
- February 2024: The NOVA-C, designed, developed and tested at the Houston Spaceport, becomes the first American spacecraft to land on the Moon since Apollo 17 in 1972.
