= Airborne Tactical Advantage Company =

Air combat training in Virginia, US

- Type: Private
- Founded: 1994
- Headquarters: Newport News, Virginia, USA
- Area served: United States
- Services: contracted air services and adversary air combat training
- Website: ATAC.com

Airborne Tactical Advantage Company (ATAC), is a government contractor based in Newport News, Virginia, United States. It operates Dassault Mirage F1, Mk-58 Hawker Hunter, Israeli F-21 Kfir, Douglas A-4 Skyhawk, and Aero L-39 Albatros military aircraft in tactical flight training roles for the United States Navy, United States Air Force, and Air National Guard.

Its main air operations base is at Naval Air Station Point Mugu, California. It sends aircraft as far away as Naval Air Facility Atsugi in Japan.

ATAC was acquired by Textron in 2016 and continues to operate as a subsidiary.

== Fleet ==
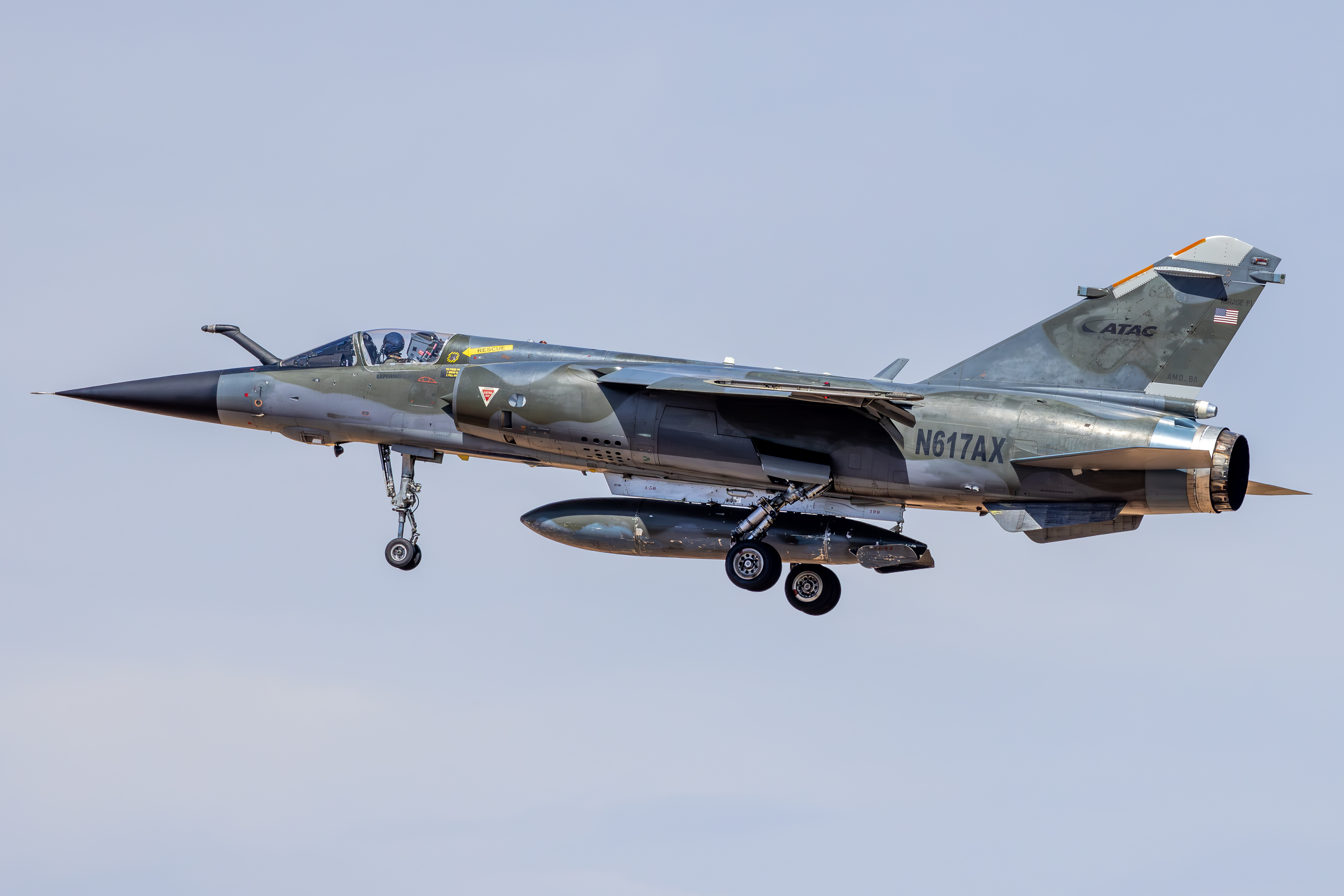
ATAC Dassault Mirage F1CR N617AX landing at Luke Air Force Base, Arizona, August 2023

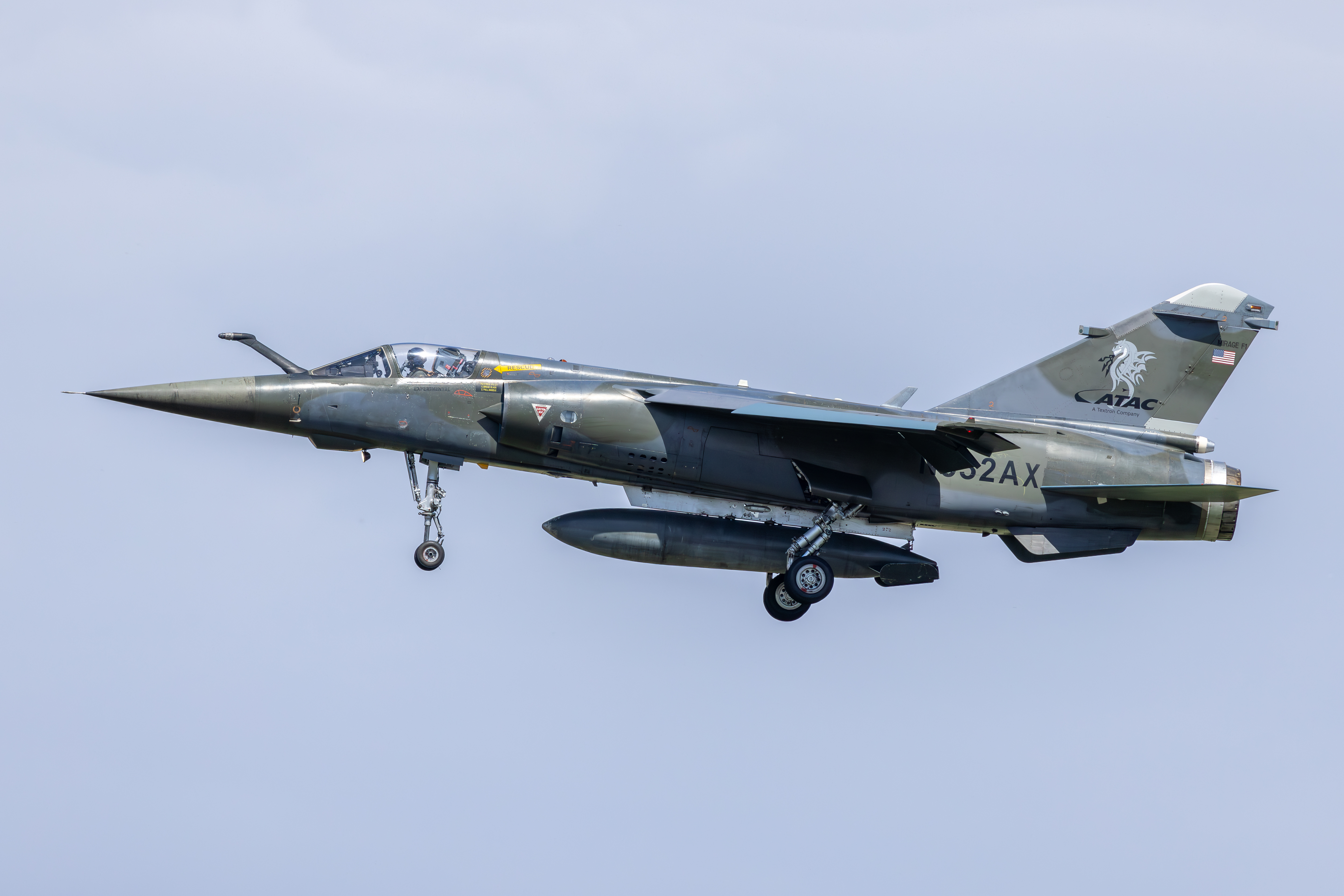
ATAC Dassault Mirage F1CT N632AX at Luke Air Force Base, August 2023

The ATAC air fleet includes the following aircraft

- 20 Hawker Hunters
- 6 IAI F-21 Kfirs
- 1 Douglas A-4 Skyhawk
- 2 Aero L-39 Albatroses
- 63 Dassault Mirage F1s

== Accidents and incidents ==
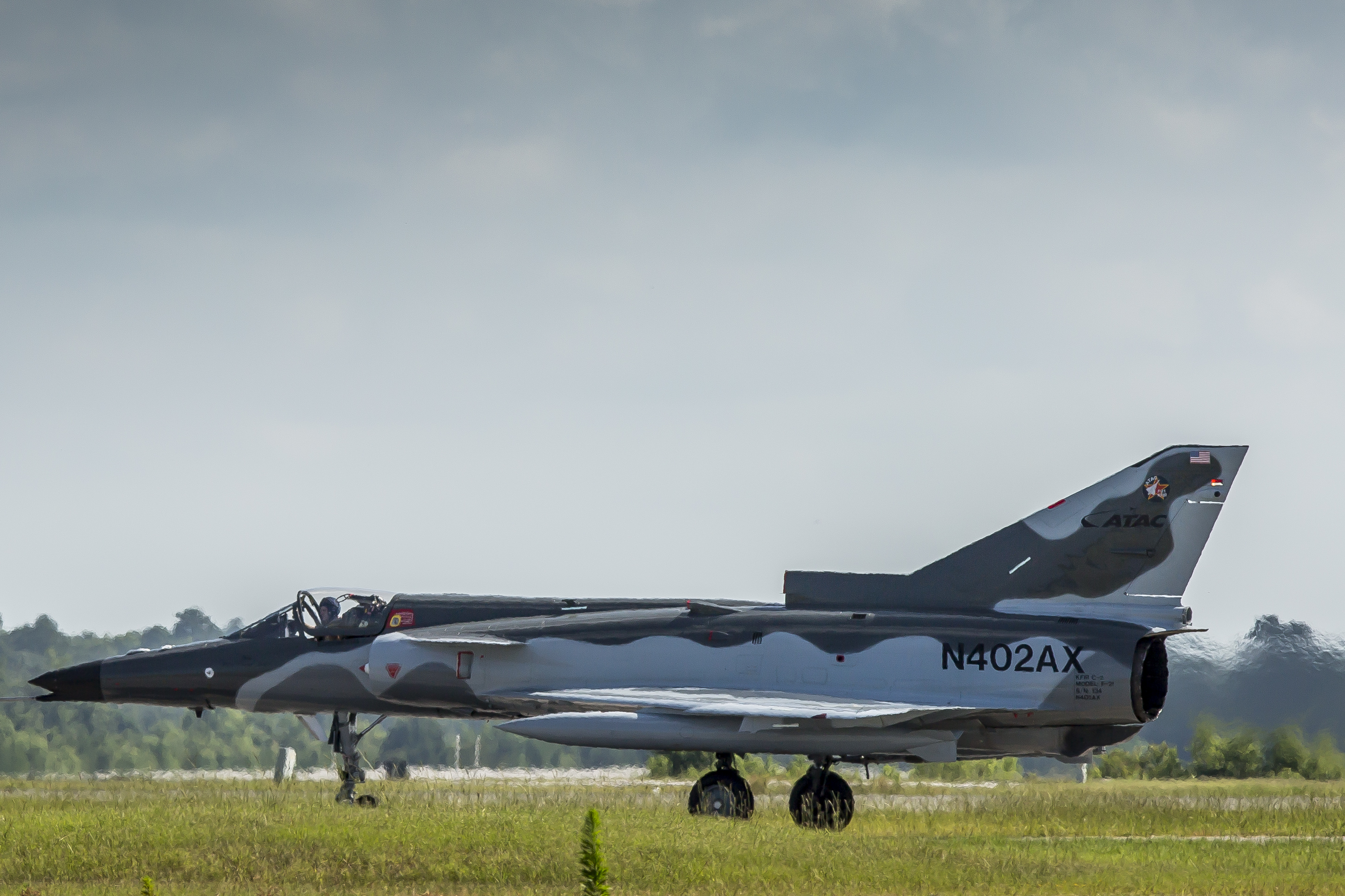
One IAI F-21 Kfir of ATAC in 2016.

- 8 July 2010: Douglas A-4 Skyhawk N132AT lost power during takeoff and crashed in a field near Naval Air Station Fallon. The pilot ejected safely. Investigations by the Federal Aviation Administration (FAA) and National Transportation Safety Board (NTSB) were completed.
- 6 March 2012: IAI Kfir N404AX crashed into a building near at Naval Air Station Fallon in inclement weather, killing the pilot. Investigations by the FAA and NTSB were completed.
- 18 May 2012: Hawker Hunter N329AX crashed in a field on final approach to Naval Air Station Point Mugu, killing the pilot. Investigations by the FAA and NTSB have been completed.
- 29 October 2014: Hawker Hunter N332AX crashed in a field near Naval Air Station Point Mugu, killing the pilot. Investigations by the FAA and NTSB have been completed.
- 22 August 2017 : Hawker Hunter crashed about 100 miles off the coast of San Diego, California. The pilot was able to eject and was recovered by a U.S. Navy helicopter from aircraft carrier USS Theodore Roosevelt.
- 25 February 2021: Mirage F1B slid off the end of the runway at Tyndall Air Force Base. Both pilots were transported to the local hospital.
- 14 April 2021: Hawker Hunter N331AX suffered a runway excursion incident at Marine Corps Air Station Yuma.
- 20 June 2022: Hawker Hunter N337AX crashed approximately 41 nautical miles off the coast of Wrightsville Beach, North Carolina. The pilot was able to eject, suffering a spinal injury upon ejection. Investigations by the FAA and NTSB have been completed.
- 15 October 2025: Hawker Hunter N335AX crashed around 5 nautical miles off Big Sur, California. Pilot ejected and was recovered by a U.S. Navy helicopter.
- 22 September 2026: Hawker Hunter N345AX crashed around 5 nautical miles off the coast of Morro Bay, California. The pilot safely ejected and was recovered by a U.S. Navy helicopter.

== See also ==
- Aggressor squadron
- Draken International
- Tactical Air Support
- Top Aces
- Ravn Aerospace
