= Tactical Air Support =

American defense contractor

Tactical Air Support, Inc.
- Company type: Private
- Industry: Defense, Government contractor
- Founded: Nevada, US, 2005
- Founder: Rolland C. Thompson
- Headquarters: Reno-Stead Airport, Reno, US
- Area served: U.S. and worldwide
- Key people: Rolland C. Thompson, President and CEO; Ronald R. Fogleman, Board Chairman
- Services: Commercial air services to the armed forces, including JTAC training, UAV chase, flight training and adversary support; Consulting services to military aviation fighter/attack and electronic attack communities
- Subsidiaries: TacAir Global Corp
- Website: www.tacticalairsupport.com

Tactical Air Support, Inc. (Tactical Air) is an American defense contractor headquartered in Reno, Nevada at Reno-Stead Airport. Some of its employees are former fighter weapons school and operational commanders, instructors, and/or test pilots that specialize in advanced tactical air support. Tactical Air provides consulting and commercial air services (including JTAC training, UAV chase, flight training, maintenance, logistics, and adversary support) to U.S. and allied forces in a manner similar to the Naval Strike and Air Warfare Center (NSAWC) and the USAF Weapons School. TacAir Global, LLC, a wholly owned subsidiary of Tactical Air Support, Inc., focuses on international training. In 2013, Tactical Air began providing F-5 refresher training to the Botswana Defence Force.

== Aircraft ==
Tactical Air Support's flight operations began in 2008 when it became the first private company outside of Sukhoi trained to fly, operate, and maintain the Sukhoi Su-27 Flanker. In September 2011, Tactical Air received an Embraer A-29 Super Tucano in contract-ready condition. The two-seat, turboprop Super Tucano is a specialty military light-attack aircraft renowned for its capabilities in counter-insurgency and air-to-ground bombing, and is the only one of its kind offered in the U.S. through an Aerospace/Defense services contractor as Tactical Air is the only commercial operator currently flying one. In 2013, the company added four Canadair CF-5D Freedom Fighters and an F-5B, (supersonic fighter/attack aircraft all two-seater ) and 20 years' worth of spare F-5 parts to its existing aircraft fleet. The company's fleet also includes Aero L-39 Albatros jet trainer/light attack aircraft, Marchetti SF-260TP and SM-1019 turboprop light attack/utility aircraft, and Mooney M20E and Cirrus SR20 aircraft used for UAV chase and pilot currency. In 2017, 21 F-5 E/F were recovered from Royal Jordanian Air Force.

== Aircrew ==
Tactical Air Support is made up of U.S. Navy, Marine Corps, and Air Force tactical jet fighter pilots, most of whom served 20 or more years on active duty. Several of the aircrew still serve and fly in the Reserves and Air National Guard. Nearly every member of Tactical Air is a weapons school graduate (USN/USMC/USAF) and most are former TOPGUN instructors.

== Consulting ==
Tactical Air Support's aircrew serve as consultants and tactical subject matter experts for Naval Air Systems Command, Navy Warfare Development Command, NSAWC, and others. It partners with larger defense industry companies (including Lockheed Martin, Wyle, ManTech, and MITRE) on projects that need recent tactical expertise and rapid reach back to the warfare centers of excellence. This support includes technical publication development, project management, tactics development & evaluation, modeling & simulation, and tactical training.

== Board of directors ==
Tactical Air Support's board of directors is chaired by General Ronald Fogleman (former Chief of Staff, USAF) and consists of business leaders and retired USN and USMC flag/general officers that served as leaders in their respective service's tactical jet communities.

== See also ==
- Aggressor squadron
- Airborne Tactical Advantage Company
- Draken International
- Top Aces
- Ravn Aerospace
