= Draken International =

American provider of fighter aircraft

Draken International, LLC

- An A-4 Skyhawk and a MiG-21 on display in front of company headquarters.
- Type: Private
- Founded: 2012
- Founder: Jared Isaacman
- Headquarters: Lakeland, Florida, US
- Area served: United States
- Key people: Nic Anderson (CEO)
- Owner: Blackstone Inc.
- Website: draken.aero

Draken International, LLC is an American provider of tactical fighter aircraft for contract air services including military and defense industry customers. The firm is based at the Lakeland Linder International Airport in Lakeland, Florida, and also has operating bases at Kinston Regional Jetport and Kelly Field in San Antonio, Texas.

Draken offers airborne adversary support (Red Air), joint terminal attack controller (JTAC), close air support (CAS), flight training, threat simulation, electronic warfare support, aerial refueling, research, and testing services to the U.S. Department of Defense, U.S. defense contractors and aerospace firms, provided by a fleet of former military aircraft.

== History ==
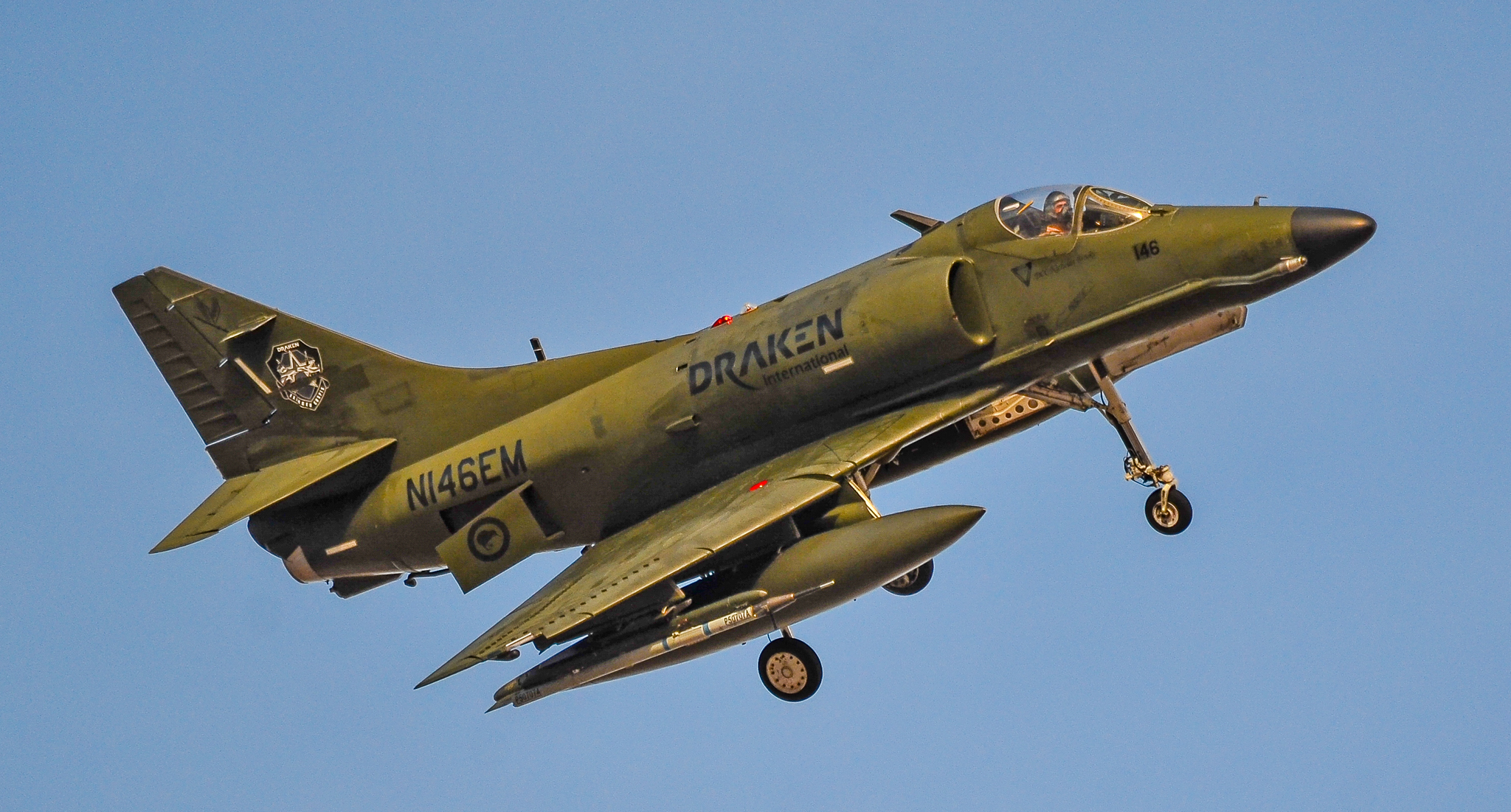
A Draken Douglas A-4K

Draken was established by Jared Isaacman at Lakeland Linder International Airport in January 2012. In 2015, the company was awarded contracts to provide training for the Air National Guard (ANG) at Volk Field in Wisconsin, for the U.S. Marine Corps (USMC) Joint Tactical Air Control at MCAS Cherry Point, North Carolina, and at the Marine Corps Air Ground Combat Center Twentynine Palms, California, as well as providing “adversary support” at Nellis Air Force Base in Las Vegas, Nevada. It also won a contract with the French Navy.

In March 2018, Draken announced a $6.7 million expansion of its headquarters and repair infrastructure at Lakeland Linder International Airport.

On 1 June 2018, the Department of Defense announced that the U.S. Air Force (USAF) had awarded Draken a $280 million contract to continue providing training services for the 57th Adversary Tactics Group at Nellis AFB, as well as Luke AFB in Arizona and Hill AFB in Utah.

In November 2018, the ANG awarded Draken a five-year contract to provide red air services to support key combat readiness training exercises throughout the United States.

Draken provides JTAC training and CAS for the USMC at MCAS Cherry Point and MCAS Yuma, Arizona and United States Navy's (USN) Naval Aviation Warfighting Development Center at NAS Fallon, Nevada.

Draken was one of seven companies awarded an IDIQ contract to support the USAF's Combat Air Force Contracted Air Support (CAF CAS) program in October 2019.

In 2020, Blackstone bought Draken International.

On May 24, 2021, a Mirage F1 operating in the adversarial role crashed near Nellis AFB. The pilot was killed. Military officials and the National Transportation Safety Board launched investigations.

In 2021, Draken announced agreements to purchase up to 24 F-16 Fighting Falcons from the Netherlands and Norway. However, as of 2024 the sales have been cancelled and the aircraft redirected to Ukraine and Romania.

== Fleet ==
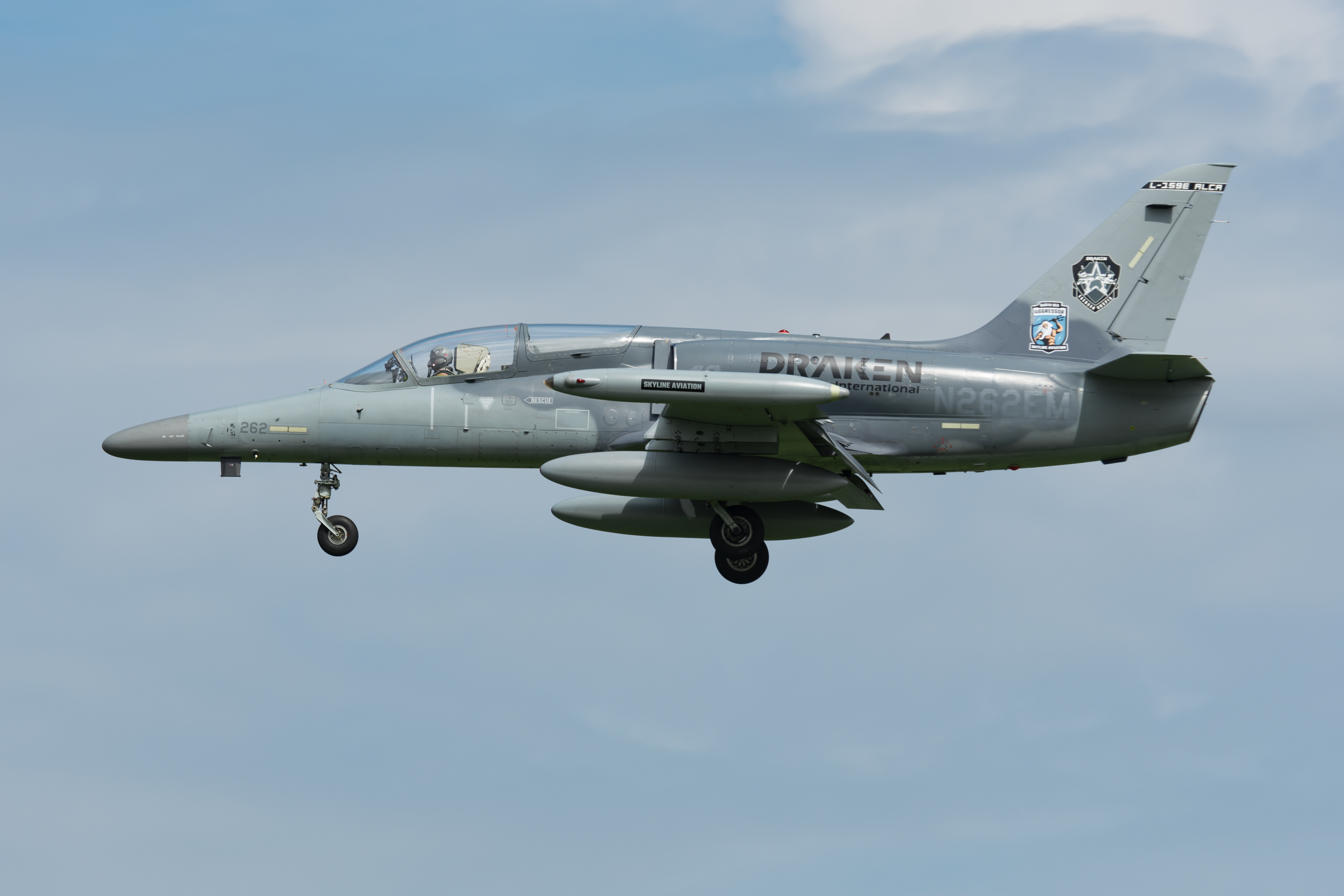
Aero L-159E aircraft operated by Draken International

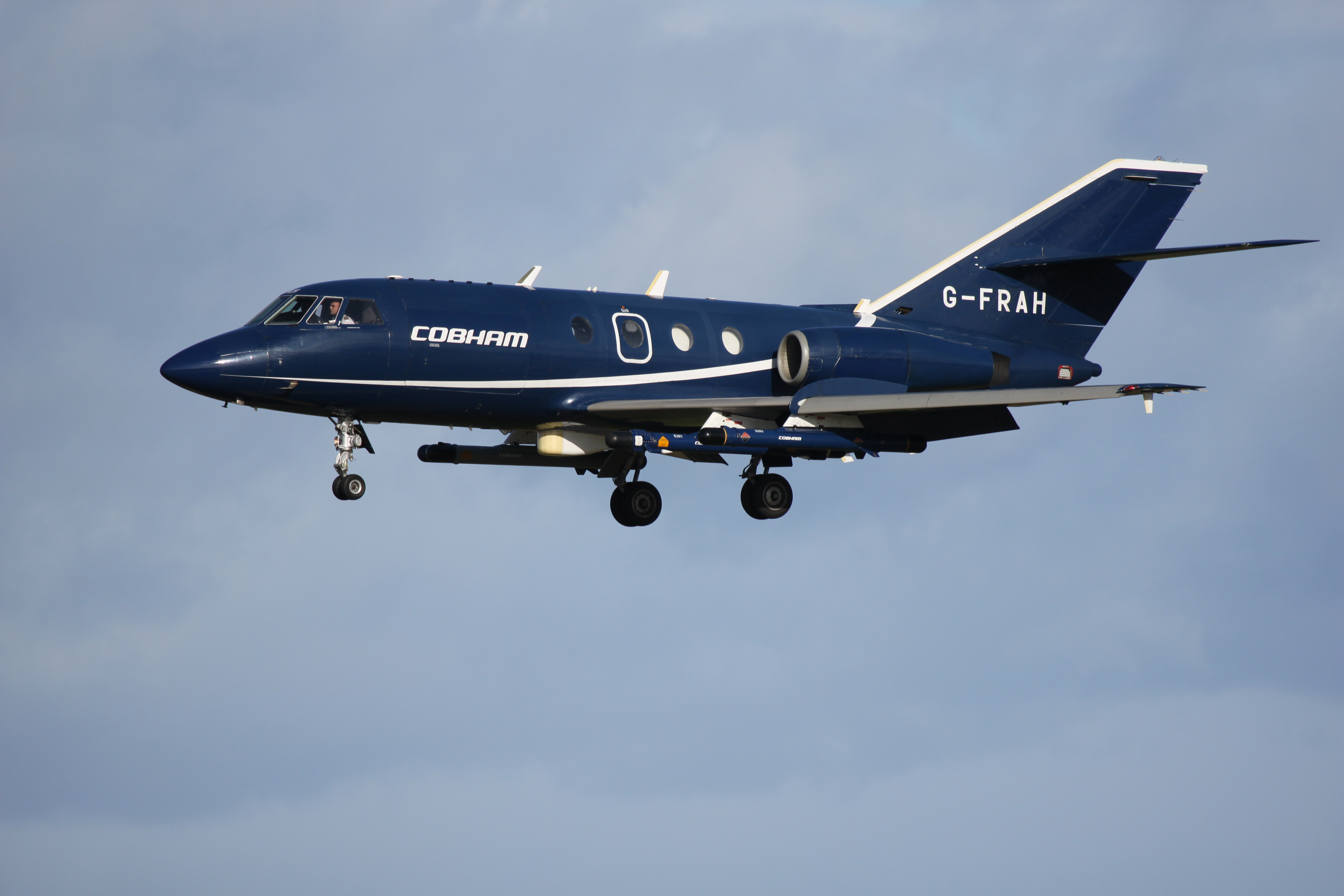
Ex-Cobham Falcon 20 operated by Draken Europe

With approximately 150 jets, the company operates the largest fleet of privately owned former military tactical jet aircraft in the world. The company's fleet as of 2021 included:

- 13 A-4K Skyhawks
- 23 L-159E ALCA
- 21 Dassault Mirage F1
- 25 MiG-21bis
- 12 Atlas Cheetah (3 delivered as of 2025.)
- 15 Dassault Falcon 20 were acquired by the takeover of Cobham Aviation as Draken Europe in 2020

In 2020, to supplement the fleet of former Spanish Air Force aircraft, Draken imported the first of up to 25 former Royal Jordanian Air Force (RJAF) Mirage F1CJ, DJ and EJ aircraft.

== Aircrew ==
The company's pilots are a combination of USAF, U.S. Navy and USMC tactical jet pilots who are retired from those services or who continue to serve part-time in the reserve components of those services, including the Air National Guard. Their backgrounds include USAF Weapons School graduates and instructors, U.S. Navy Fighter Weapons School (TOPGUN) graduates and instructors, USAF aggressor pilots, USN/USMC adversary pilots and Strike Fighter Tactics Instructors (SFTI), USAF air liaison officers, former USAF Thunderbirds demonstration pilots and USAF/USN/USMC forward air controller - airborne (FAC-A) instructors, with some of the more senior pilots having previously served as commanders (USAF) and commanding officers (USN/USMC) of operational fighter, strike fighter, and Marine fighter attack squadrons, groups and wings while on active duty or in the Reserve Components. The company also has a small handful of retired military radar intercept officers and weapon systems officers who fly with the pilots in the company's multi-seat aircraft.

== Activities outside the U.S. ==
Draken International and Secapem, a French manufacturer of towed aerial gunnery banners, have created a joint venture called SDTS utilising a number of A-4N Skyhawk aircraft.

In September 2020, Draken International purchased Cobham Aviation Services from Bournemouth, UK and renamed it Draken Europe. Draken Europe fly a range of aircraft, with their largest fleet being heavily modified Dassault Falcon 20s, fitted with a range of equipment to provide Operational Readiness Training.

== See also ==
- Aggressor squadron
- Airborne Tactical Advantage Company
- Tactical Air Support, Inc.
- Top Aces
- Ravn Aerospace
