= Ravn Aerospace =

American defense contractor

- Type: Private
- Founded: 1994
- Founder: Don Kirlin
- Headquarters: Houston, Texas
- Services: Contract air services to the US Department of Defense
- Website: https://www.ravnaero.com/

Ravn Aerospace, formerly known as AirUSA, is an American defense contractor based at Houston Spaceport in Houston, Texas. It offers adversary air, close air support, Joint Terminal Attack Controller, and Intelligence, Surveillance, and Reconnaissance training to the United States Department of Defense.

Ravn Aero's first aircraft, a Czech Aero L-39 Albatros, was purchased in 1994. Then, two years later, the company purchased two Mikoyan MiG-29s from Kyrgyzstan. In 2019, AirUSA was one of seven companies awarded an IDIQ contract to support the United States Air Force's Combat Air Force Contract Air Support (CAF CAS) program in October 2019.

In March 2020 the Australian Minister for Defence Industry Melissa Price announced that up to 46 ex-Royal Australian Air Force F/A-18 Hornets, as well as associated spare parts and test equipment inventory, would be sold to AirUSA. In December 2021 the Australian Defence Magazine reported that the status of the Australian Hornet sale was "unknown".

The contract to sell former RAAF Hornets to Ravn Aerospace lapsed in December 2023 with none having been transferred.

== World Aerospace Museum ==
The company briefly operated the World Aerospace Museum at the Quincy Regional Airport near Quincy, Illinois.

== History ==
Prior to becoming Ravn Aerospace, the company was known as AirUSA. Following the introduction of the BAE Systems Hawk 67 acquired from the Republic of Korea Air Force (ROKAF), two accidents occurred, with the latter resulting in the death of an innocent bystander on the ground. The subsequent National Transportation Safety Board investigation found substantial shortcomings in operational procedures, including deviations from the approved flight manual, and an inadequate stores clearance of a SUU-20 stores dispenser. The United States Marine Corps subsequently prohibited further use of the Hawk on CAS contracts and they were stored until being reactivated to support the CAF CAS program in 2019.

== Fleet ==
An Air USA Dassault/Dornier Alpha Jet shortly before taking off to support US military training in 2013

As of April 2026, Ravn Aerospace possesses :

- 6 Aero L-39 Albatros
- 10 BAE Systems Hawk 67 (formerly South Korean)

== See also ==
- Aggressor squadron
- Airborne Tactical Advantage Company
- Draken International
- Tactical Air Support
- Top Aces
