= Top Aces =

Canadian Defence Contractor

Top Aces Inc.
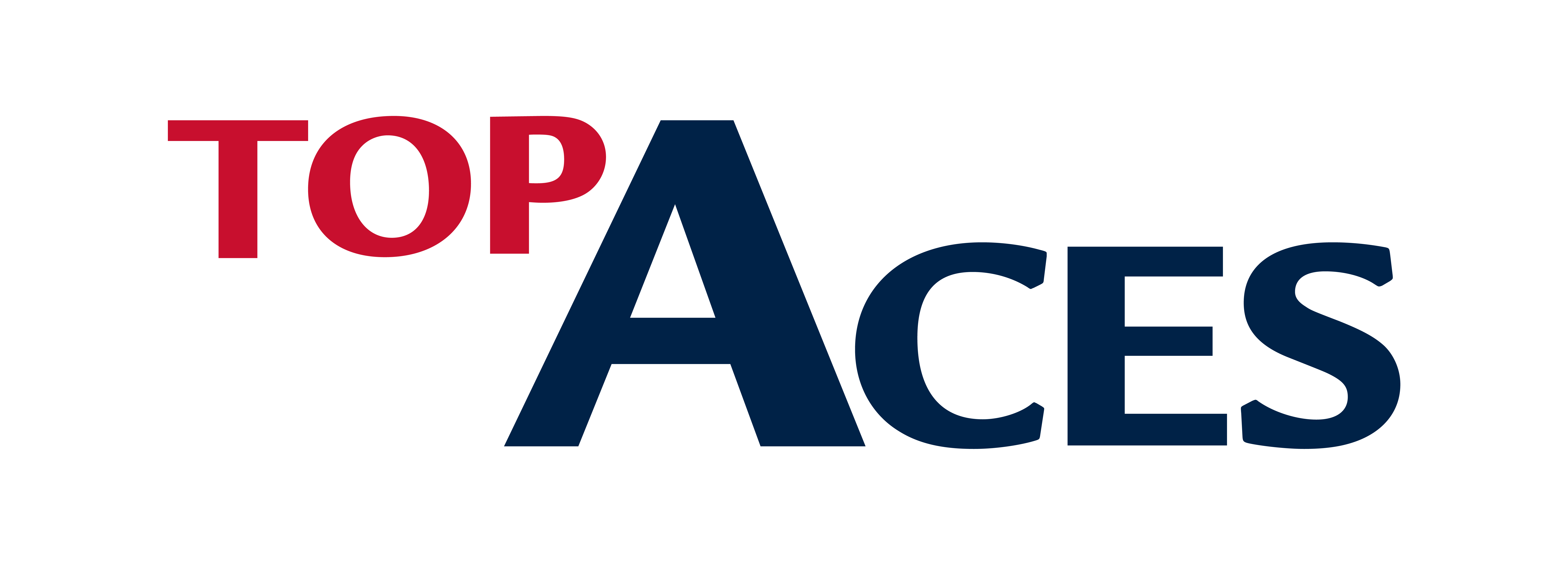
- Industry: Specialized Aviation
- Founded: 2000
- Headquarters: Montreal, Quebec, Canada
- Key people: Paul Bouchard, President; Didier Toussaint, Group President
- Website: www.topaces.com

Top Aces Inc. is a Montreal, Quebec-based defence contractor that offers contracted airborne training services primarily to the Canadian Armed Forces, Bundeswehr, and United States Air Force, and other NATO allies. The company has permanent operating bases in Canada, the US, and Germany, plus supporting exercises at temporary locations all across North America and Europe. Operating a fleet of modernized fighter aircraft flown by highly experienced former and current military pilots, they provide Red Air threat replication, Joint Terminal Attack Controller (JTAC) training, practice munitions drop, air-to-air gunnery training, and naval target tow profiles. As of 2024, Top Aces has flown an industry-leading 130,000 accident-free flight hours in support of military customers.

The Alpha Jet and Lear 35 platforms are also used by No. 414 Squadron RCAF for electronic warfare training and tactics development, and support for advanced radar trials in nationally controlled environments, as part of the CATS contract. All Electronic Warfare Officers and EW role equipment being provided by the Royal Canadian Air Force. The Aerospace Engineering Test Establishment (AETE) of the RCAF also uses Top Aces Alpha Jets for testing, chase, and pilot proficiency, being flown by RCAF personnel.

== History ==
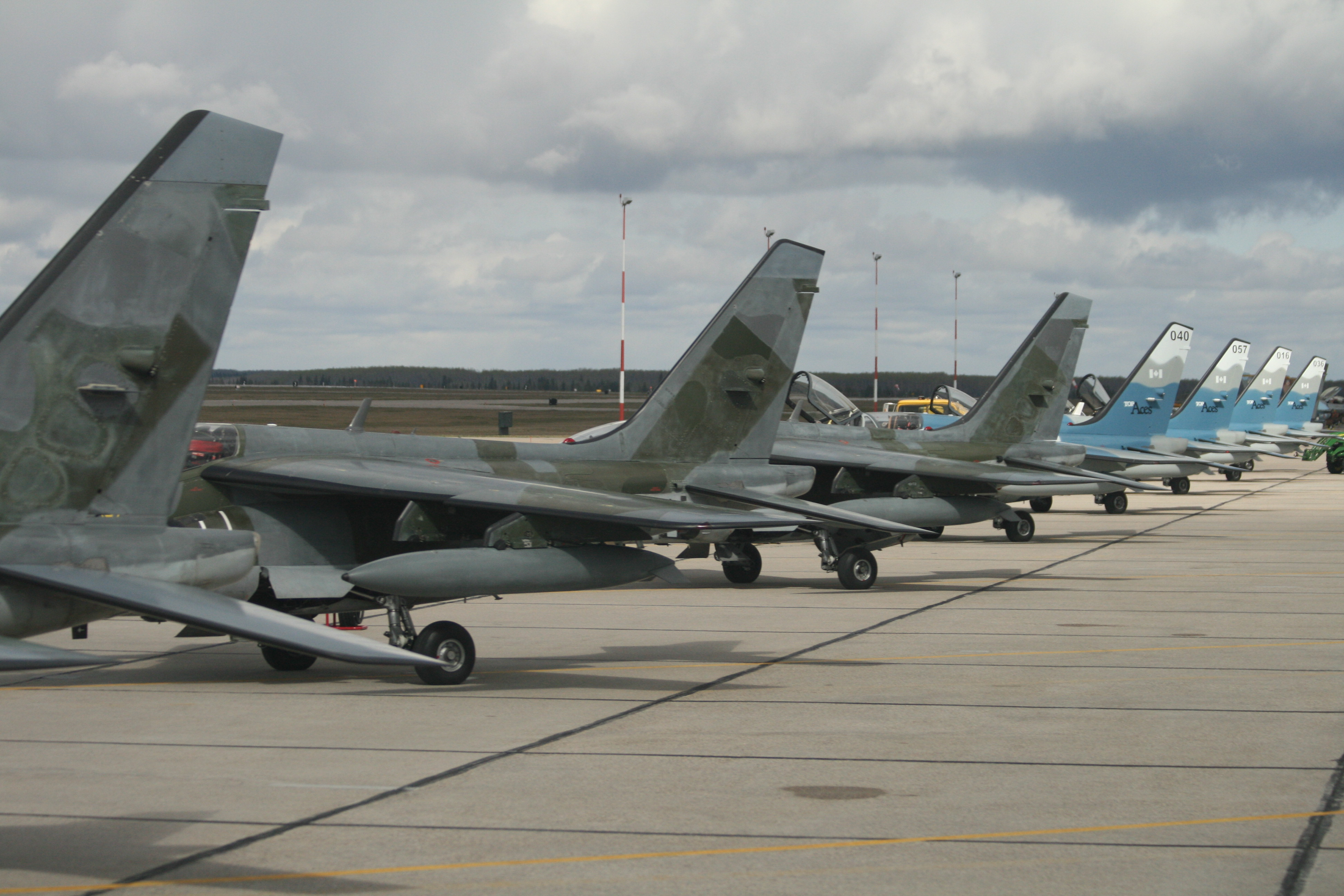
Alpha Jets line up in Top Aces colours

Top Aces was founded in 2000 by three former Royal Canadian Air Force CF-18 fighter pilots. In 2005, Top Aces signed a $94-million contract with the Canadian Armed Forces to supply contracted combat support and adversary training.

In 2014, the company signed a contract to provide fast jet airborne training services to the German Armed Forces for five years. This contract was then extended and expanded in 2021.

In 2017, Top Aces was awarded a long-term Contracted Airborne Training Services contract with the Government of Canada. The CATS contract was amended in 2023, extending it to 2029 and expanding it by adding A-4N aircraft. In March 2017, Top Aces was awarded a short-term contract to provide training support to the Australian Defence Force, with three Alpha Jet aircraft deployed to RAAF Base Williamtown for two years.

An F-16A of Top Aces in the United States, 2026

In November 2020, it was reported that Top Aces was talking with the Israeli Ministry of Defense about buying 29 early-model Lockheed Martin F-16A fighter aircraft for $3 to 4 million apiece. Four of the planned 29 F-16s arrived in Top Aces F-16 Center of Excellence in Mesa, Arizona, in January 2021 and began flying operations for the USAF in early 2022. Top Aces plans to ship the rest of the orders in 12 batches with two jets arriving every other month.

In 2022, Top Aces merged with Blue Air Training, headquartered in Las Vegas, Nevada. Blue Air Training provides close air support training to JTACs from the US and NATO. The company employs veteran attack pilots and JTACs operating a mixed fleet of turboprop aircraft and helicopters that can fire or drop bombs, guns, and rockets.

In 2024, the Canadian government announced a contract with Top Aces to train Ukraine F-16 pilots.

Top Aces, formerly Discovery Air Defence Services (DADS), is no longer a 'Wholly Owned Subsidiary' of the parent company Discovery Air. It is now owned by Clairvest and other unnamed investors with transactions completed on 22 December 2017. As of July 2018, Top Aces Inc, Top Aces Holdings Inc and Clairvest are subject to ongoing legal proceedings lodged in the Ontario Superior Court of Justice (Commercial List).

== Fleet ==
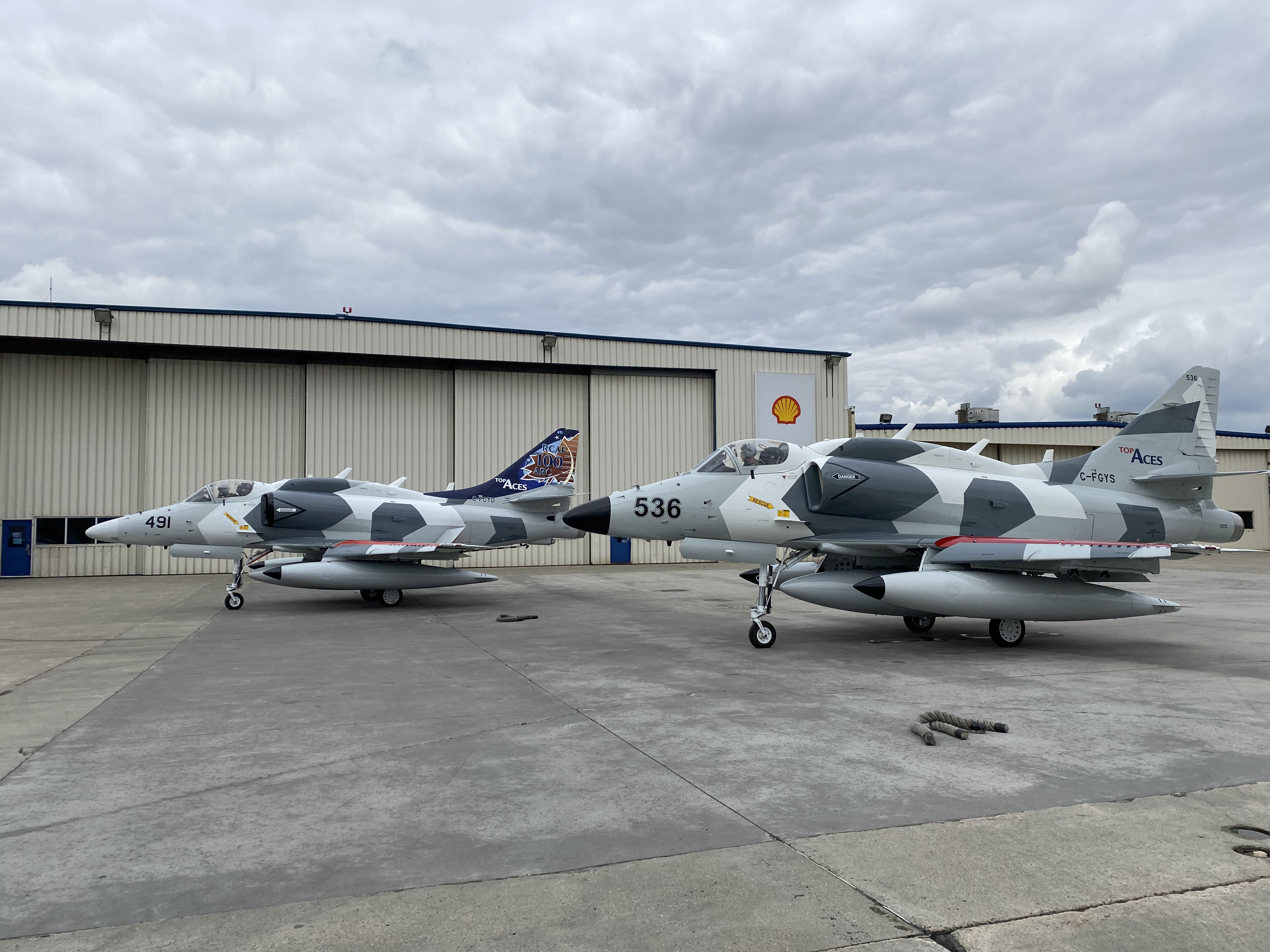
Top Aces A-4Ns in Canada

Some Alpha Jets retained the German Air Force paint schemes, and the F-16s retained their Israeli Air Force paint schemes. The remaining Alpha Jets and A-4s have been repainted in aggressor camouflage colours that mimic certain foreign aircraft. Small low visibility Canadian flags have been added to the vertical tail stabilizers of aircraft contracted to the Royal Canadian Air Force.

The A-4N and F-16 fleets have been upgraded with Top Aces proprietary Advanced Aggressor Mission System. This system is designed to provide high fidelity threat simulation and includes AESA radar, HMCS, IRST, Tactical Datalink, and EW capabilities. To reflect this, the upgraded aircraft are referred to by the company as the Advanced Aggressor Fighter or AAF variants.

As of 2024, Top Aces and Blue Air Training have the following aircraft listed with Transport Canada, the FAA, or in long-term storage.

Top Aces fleet
Aircraft	No. of aircraft	Variants	Notes
Dassault/Dornier Alpha Jet	60	Model A (35), Model 1B(25)	19 Alpha Jet A's operating in Canada and Europe. 1B's and remaining A's in long-term storage and not all registered.
Learjet 35	3	35A	
Lockheed Martin F-16A	29	F-16A/B	Registered and operating in the United States.
Mcdonnell Douglas A-4 Skyhawk	22	A-4N (21), TA-4J (1)	8 A-4N-AAFs operating in Europe, with additional A-4N-AAFs and TA-4J added to the Canadian CATS program beginning in mid 2024.

Blue Air Training fleet
Aircraft	No. of aircraft	Variants	Notes
Valmet A-90 Raider	8		L-90 Redigo modernized and specialized for the CAS training role.
Rockwell OV-10 Bronco	7	OV-10G	
Pilatus PC-9	10	PC-9/A	
IAR-823 Brasov	6		
Bell 206 Longranger		206L3	

Previously operated aircraft:

- Beechcraft Super King Air - 2
- Bombardier Challenger 600 - 5
- IAI Westwind - 4

== See also ==
- Aggressor squadron
- Airborne Tactical Advantage Company
- Draken International
- Tactical Air Support
- Ravn Aerospace
