= Ellington Airport (Texas) =

Airport in Texas, United States

Ellington Airport Ellington Field
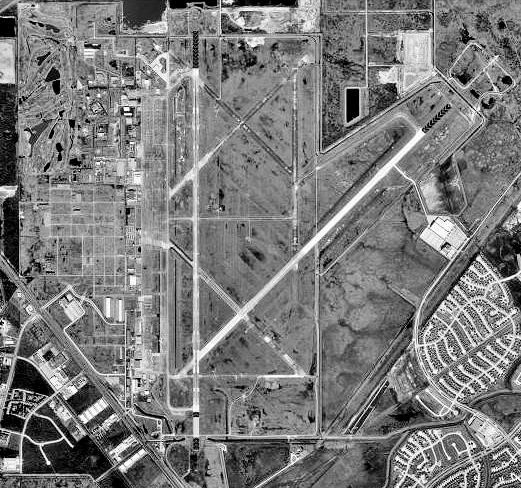
- USGS 1995 orthophoto
- IATA: EFD; ICAO: KEFD; FAA LID: EFD

Summary
- Airport type: Public / Military
- Owner: City of Houston
- Operator: Houston Airport System
- Serves: Houston, Texas
- Opened: 21 May 1917 (109 years ago)
- Elevation AMSL: 32 ft (9.8 m)
- Coordinates: 29°36′26″N 095°09′32″W
- Website: Official website

Maps
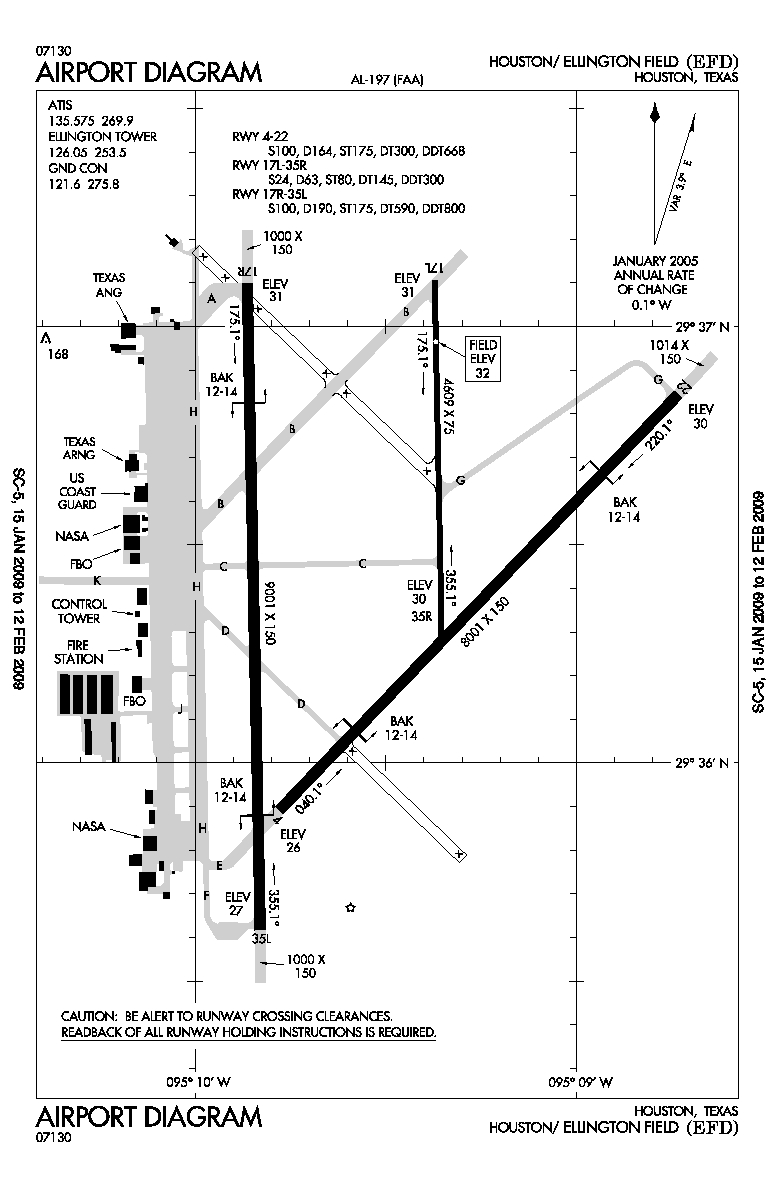
- FAA airport diagram

- Location of the airport in Texas EFD (the United States)

Runways
Direction	Length		Surface
Direction	ft	m	Surface
4/22	8,001	2,439	Concrete
17R/35L	9,001	2,744	Concrete
17L/35R	4,609	1,405	Concrete

Statistics (2022)
- Aircraft operations: 115,958
- Based aircraft: 95
- Source: Federal Aviation Administration

Ellington Airport (IATA: EFD, ICAO: KEFD, FAA LID: EFD) is a public and military use airport in Harris County, Texas, United States. It is owned by the City of Houston's department of aviation, Houston Airport System and located 15 nmi (17 mi; 28 km) southeast of downtown Houston. Formerly known as Ellington Field, then Ellington Air Force Base, then again as Ellington Field it is included in the National Plan of Integrated Airport Systems for 2011–2015, which categorized it as a general aviation reliever airport. The airport does not have scheduled commercial passenger service. However, Continental Airlines used to operate daily regional services between Ellington and Houston's George Bush Intercontinental Airport between 1990 and 2004. On 17 October 2018, the City of Houston approved Phase 1 of the Houston Spaceport project on the Ellington Airport site.

== History ==
Established by the Army Air Service on 21 May 1917, Ellington Field was one of the initial World War I Army Air Service installations when aviation was in its infancy. It is named for 1st Lt. Eric Ellington, a U.S. Army aviator who was killed in a plane crash in San Diego, California in 1913. Originally created as a training facility, Ellington Airport is currently used by military, commercial, NASA aircraft and general aviation sectors. Ellington Airport is one of the few airfields built for World War I training purposes still in operation today.

For additional history related to Ellington's status as a military airfield, see Ellington Field Joint Reserve Base.

The City of Houston annexed Ellington Field in the late 1960s.

In January 2009, a name change from Ellington Field to Ellington Airport was approved by the Houston City Council. In August 2011, the city announced that the facility would be renamed Ellington International Airport. However, as of May 2013, it is still listed as Ellington Airport by the Federal Aviation Administration and the Houston Airport System.

In April 2014, Sierra Nevada Corporation signed an agreement with Houston Airport System officials to explore development of Ellington as a commercial spaceport. The ultimate goal of the agreement is to use Ellington as a landing site for the company's Dream Chaser spaceplane. A feasibility study found it would cost US$48 million to $122 million to equip Ellington for landing and launching small space vehicles on a regular basis. With federal approval in June 2015, Ellington Airport was granted a Launch Site License from the Federal Aviation Administration that established the airport as the 10th commercial spaceport in the United States. On 17 October 2018, the city council approved Phase 1 funding of $18.8 million for improvements to streets, water, wastewater, electrical power distribution facilities and communications facilities on the site.

In September 2017, the Lone Star Flight Museum moved from Galveston's Scholes International Airport at Galveston to Ellington, a move that had been in the works since the aftermath of Hurricane Ike in 2008. The Museum built a brand new facility at Ellington to house its airworthy and static aircraft, as well as its Texas Aviation Hall of Fame. The facility is complete with training centers and administrative space, allowing the Museum to operate solely from Ellington.

Groundbreaking on Phase 1 was held in 2019 to include providing streets, water, wastewater, electrical power distribution facilities, and fiber optic and communications facilities necessary to attract future development.

== Overview ==
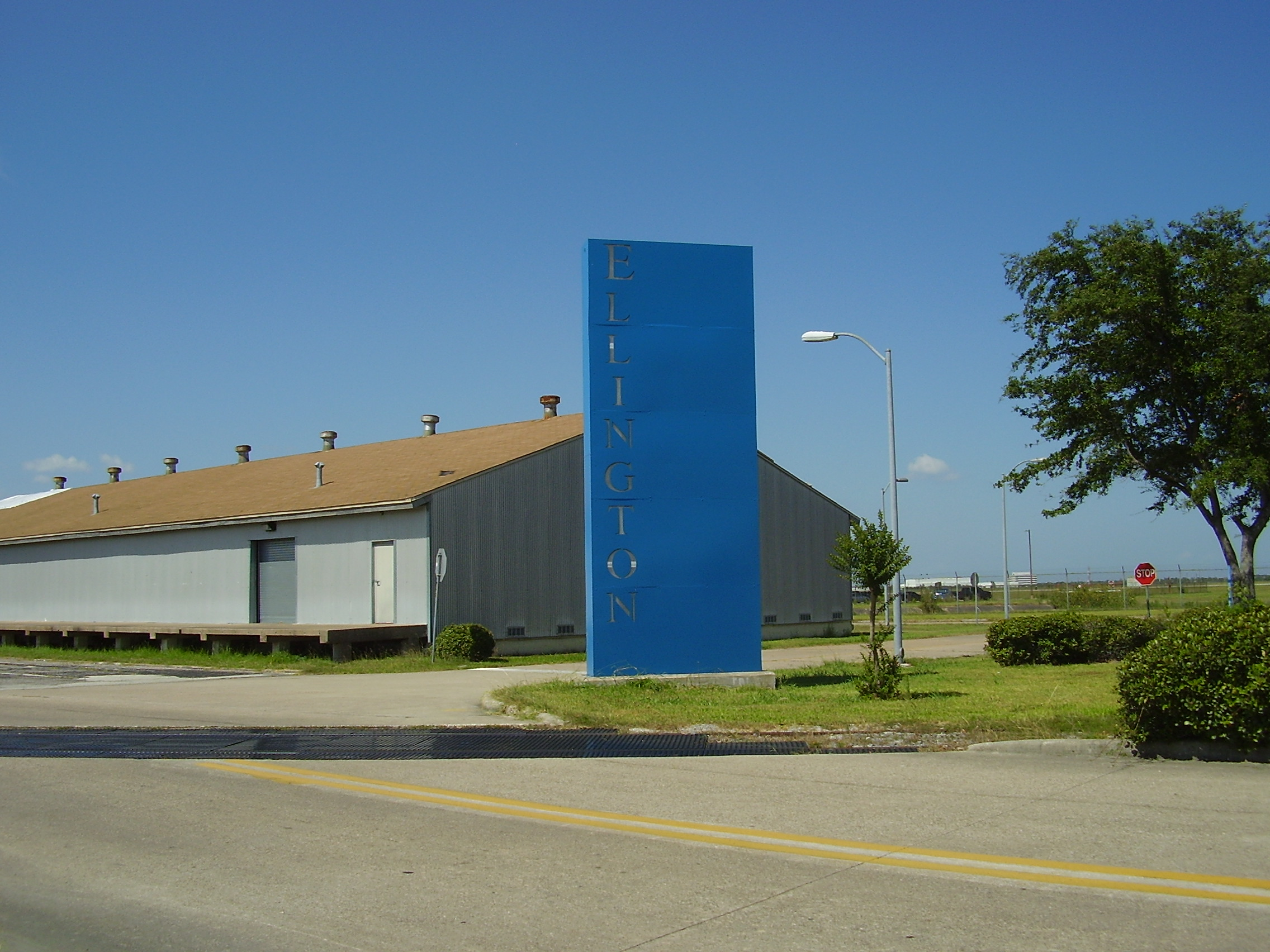
Entrance to the airport (2005)

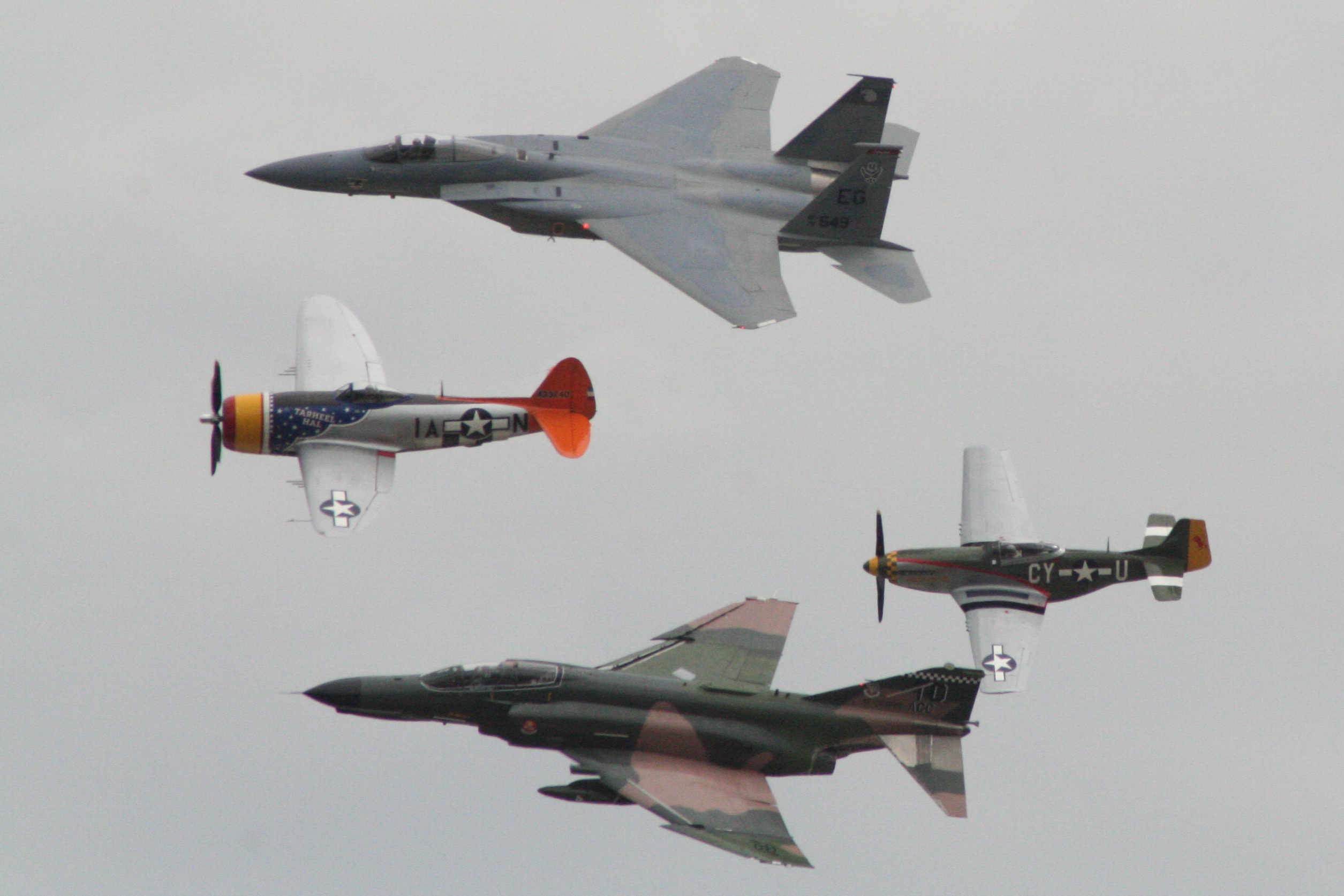
World War II and Cold War -era US aircraft flying in formation during Wings Over Houston at Ellington Airport

Ellington Airport consists of three active runways (a 9,001-foot (2,744 m) ILS CAT I runway, an 8,001-foot (2,439 m) runway, and a 4,609-foot (1,405 m) runway). The airport supports the operations of the United States military, NASA and a variety of general aviation tenants. The field is a base for NASA's administrative, cargo transport and high-altitude aircraft, which also includes NASA's fleet of T-38 Talon jets bailed to the agency from USAF, Gulfstream Shuttle Training Aircraft, and a former USN C-9 nicknamed the "Weightless Wonder VI" which replaced the former USAF NKC-135 aircraft known as the Vomit Comet, a zero-g trainer. The only three WB-57F aircraft (used for atmospheric research and reconnaissance) still flying in the world today are housed at Ellington.

The Texas Air National Guard, Texas Army National Guard and the U.S. Coast Guard also maintain a presence at the base. The Coast Guard facility known as Coast Guard Air Station Houston operates 3 Eurocopter MH-65C "Dolphin" Short-Range Recovery (SRR) helicopters for search and rescue (SAR) and port security roles. Several flight schools reside at the airfield. Ellington Field is also home to the largest flying club in Texas and the annual "Wings Over Houston" airshow.

Ellington Field once had scheduled commercial air service: Continental Express flights between Ellington Airport and George Bush Intercontinental Airport in north Houston ended in 2004. Prior to the cessation of commercial air service, the route flown between Bush Intercontinental and Ellington Field was the shortest fixed-wing route flown in the United States at only 25 nmi (46 km). Flight times were as short as six minutes, depending on direction of departure. To this day, Ellington Field serves as a reliever airport for both Bush Intercontinental and the William P. Hobby Airport, and handles diverted aircraft from those two airports during bad weather events and peak traffic times. A terminal aerodrome forecast is produced for the airfield 365 days a year at 20Z, 04Z, and 12Z by the 26th Operational Weather Squadron, a USAF weather squadron.

== Facilities and aircraft ==
Ellington Field covers an area of 2,362 acres (9.56 km^{2}) at an elevation of 32 ft (9.8 m) above mean sea level.

It has three runways with concrete surfaces:

- Runway 4/22 is 8,001 ft × 150 ft (2,439 m × 46 m)
- Runway 17R/35L is 9,001 ft × 150 ft (2,744 m × 46 m)
- Runway 17L/35R is 4,609 ft × 80 ft (1,405 m × 24 m)

For the 12-month period ending 31 December 2022, the airport had 115,958 aircraft operations, an average of 317 per day: 74% general aviation, 15% military, 9% air taxi, and 2% scheduled commercial. At that time there were 95 aircraft based at this airport: 32 single-engine, 30 jet, 8 multi-engine, and 25 military.

The Lone Star Flight Museum, which was located at Scholes from 1985 until 2017, maintains a fleet of airworthy warbirds including: North American B-25 Mitchell Bomber, Douglas A24 Banshee (Decorated as an SBD-5 Dauntless), Vought F4U Corsair, General Motors (Eastern Aircraft) TBM Avenger, Grumman F6F Hellcat, General Motors FM-2 Wildcat, North American AT-6 Texan, Beech AT-11 Kansan, Cessna AT-17 Bobcat, Stinson L-5, Douglas DC-3, and Stearman PT-17.

The Air National Guard maintains ARFF equipment for use mainly on military aircraft, however they also respond to private emergencies.

== Statistics ==
=== Annual traffic ===
Year	Passengers
1987	0
1988	0
1989	0
1990	35,908
1991	85,560
1992	108,976
1993	114,656
1994	117,895
1995	91,028
1996	94,299
1997	111,405
1998	102,550
1999	96,943
2000	73,880
2001	60,255
2002	76,035
2003	80,306
2004	53,947
2005	0
2006	0
2007	2
2008	0
2009	0
2010	1
2011	0
2012	0
2013	2
2014	4

== See also ==
- List of airports in Texas
