= Typhoon Display Team =

British aerobatic demonstration team

Typhoon Display team
- RAF Typhoon display aircraft in 2026
- Active: 2009-present
- Country: United Kingdom
- Branch: Royal Air Force
- Role: Aerobatic display
- Website: https://www.raf.mod.uk/display-teams/typhoon-display-team/

Aircraft flown
- Trainer: Eurofighter Typhoon FGR4

The Typhoon Display Team is a Flight display team of the Royal Air Force.

== History ==
The RAF Typhoon Display team was first formed in 2009. The squadron did not perform any flights in 2011 due to operational commitments of the squadron but resumed aerial displays from 2012.

To commemorate the 80th Anniversary of Operation Overlord in 2024, the squadron painted its assigned plane ZJ913 with a 1944 era ‘Day Fighter’ scheme that remembers a Hawker Typhoon of the No. 257 Squadron. The team flies the aircraft at altitudes of 1,500 to 500 ft, and a typical display includes multiple corkscrews, half-Cubans and high-speed passes. During RIAT 2024, the aircraft had an eight-minute display, flown by Flight Lieutenant David ‘Turbo’ Turnbull on a 35% blend of sustainable aviation fuel. The Squadron did a flyover during the Manx Grand prix. and flyovers in Denmark in 2025.

== Aircraft ==
The aircraft are attached to the No. 29 Squadron RAF, and based at RAF Coningsby in Lincolnshire. The squadron performs the aerial display in addition to their role as an operational conversion squadron. The Typhoon display aircraft uses the call sign Dragon form the 2026 display year.

== See also ==
- Surya Kiran
- SoloTurk
- F-16 Demo Team Zeus
- Other British aerial display teams
  - Red Arrows
  - Wildcat Demo Team
  - Chinook Display Team
