= F-16 Demo Team Zeus =

Greek aerobatic demonstration team

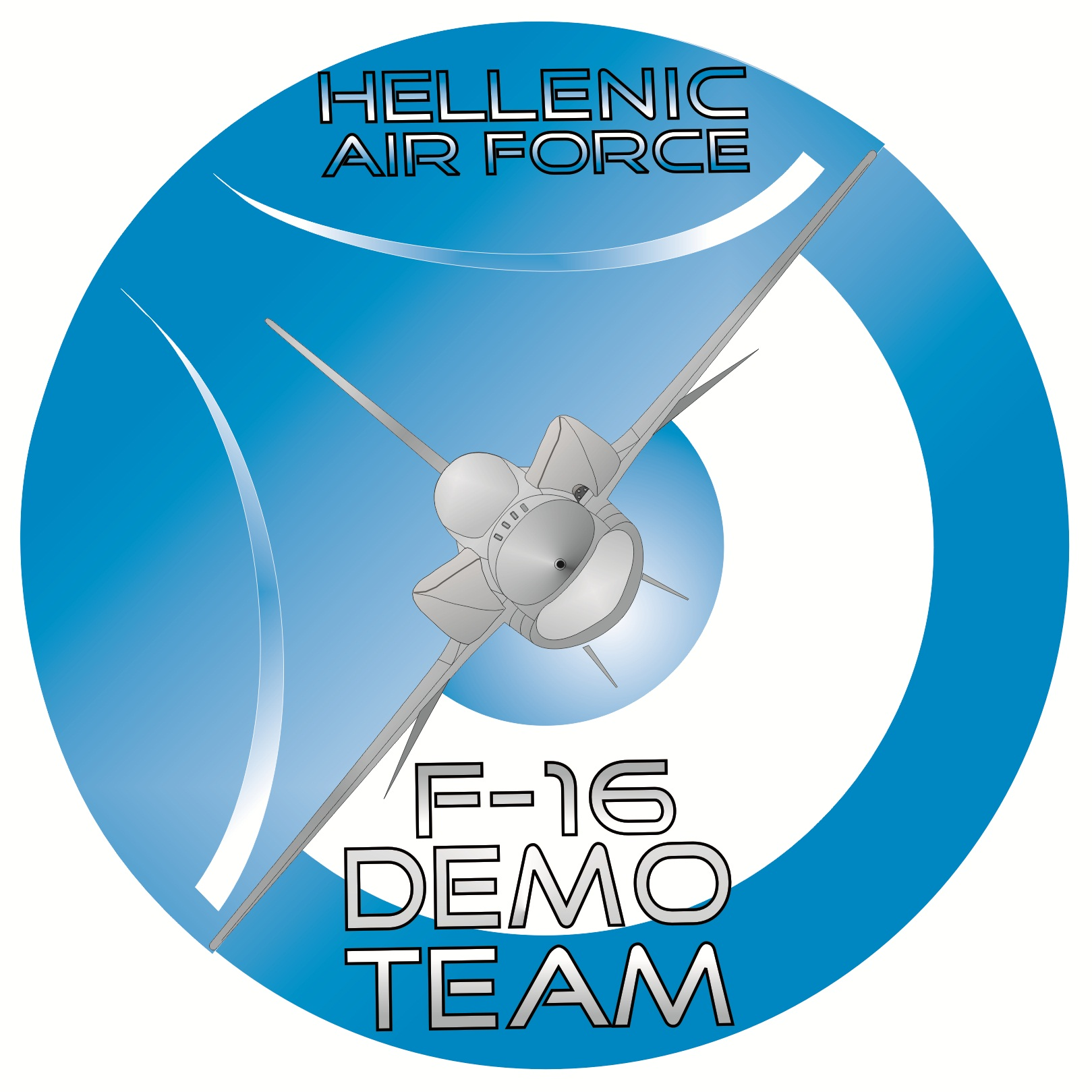
- F-16 Demo Team Zeus Patch
- Active: 2010-present
- Country: Greece
- Branch: Hellenic Air Force
- Role: Aerobatic display

Aircraft flown
- Fighter: F-16 Block 52+

The F-16 Demo Team Zeus is the official Flight display team of the Hellenic Air Force.

== History ==
The F-16 Demo Team 'Zeus' is a single aircraft air demonstration team, formed to boost the morale of both the Hellenic Armed Forces and the wider Greek society, while promoting the combat capability and the general work of the Hellenic Air Force. Previously, the HAF had multiple teams in the past such as the "Kare ton Asson”, “Acro Team”, “Hellenic Flame”, as well as the as a Single Aircraft Demonstration with a T-6A Texan II.

The team underwent its first training programme from January 4, 2010, and was formed on 1 February 2010 under the guidance of the USAF Thunderbirds team, giving its debut performance at Tanagra Air Base on 7 November 2010. The pilots are trained at the Hill Air Force Base in the USA. The team has done airshows and air-displays in Poland, Great Britain, Belgium, Netherlands, Austria, Switzerland and the Czech Republic. The unit is attached to the 115 Combat Wing based at Souda, with aircraft from either the 343rd Squadron 'Asteri' or the 340th Squadron 'Alepou'.

== Aircraft ==
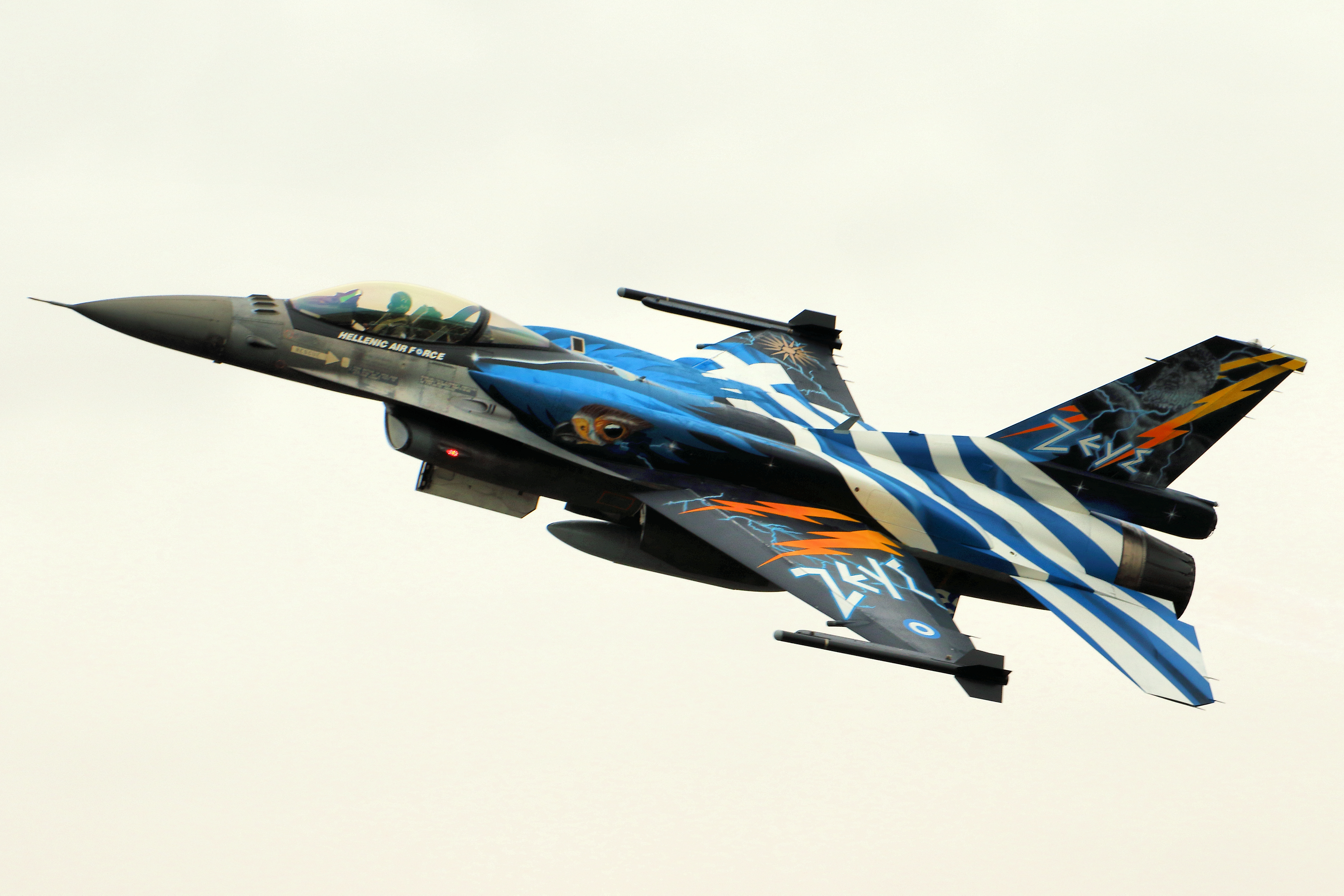
F-16 of the Display team

The team consists of an single, fully combat ready F-16C Block 52+, operated by the Hellanic Air Force. The display team is unique in the fact that they perform all operations with an Conformal Fuel Tank integrated with the aircraft, which enables the team to fly more maneuvers for longer periods. During the performance, the aircraft G loads ranging from +9.5 to -3 and has a maximum flight speed of Mach 0.94 during the performance.

== See also ==
- Surya Kiran
- SoloTurk
- Typhoon Display Team
