= Aggressor squadron =

Squadron acting as an enemy in military exercises

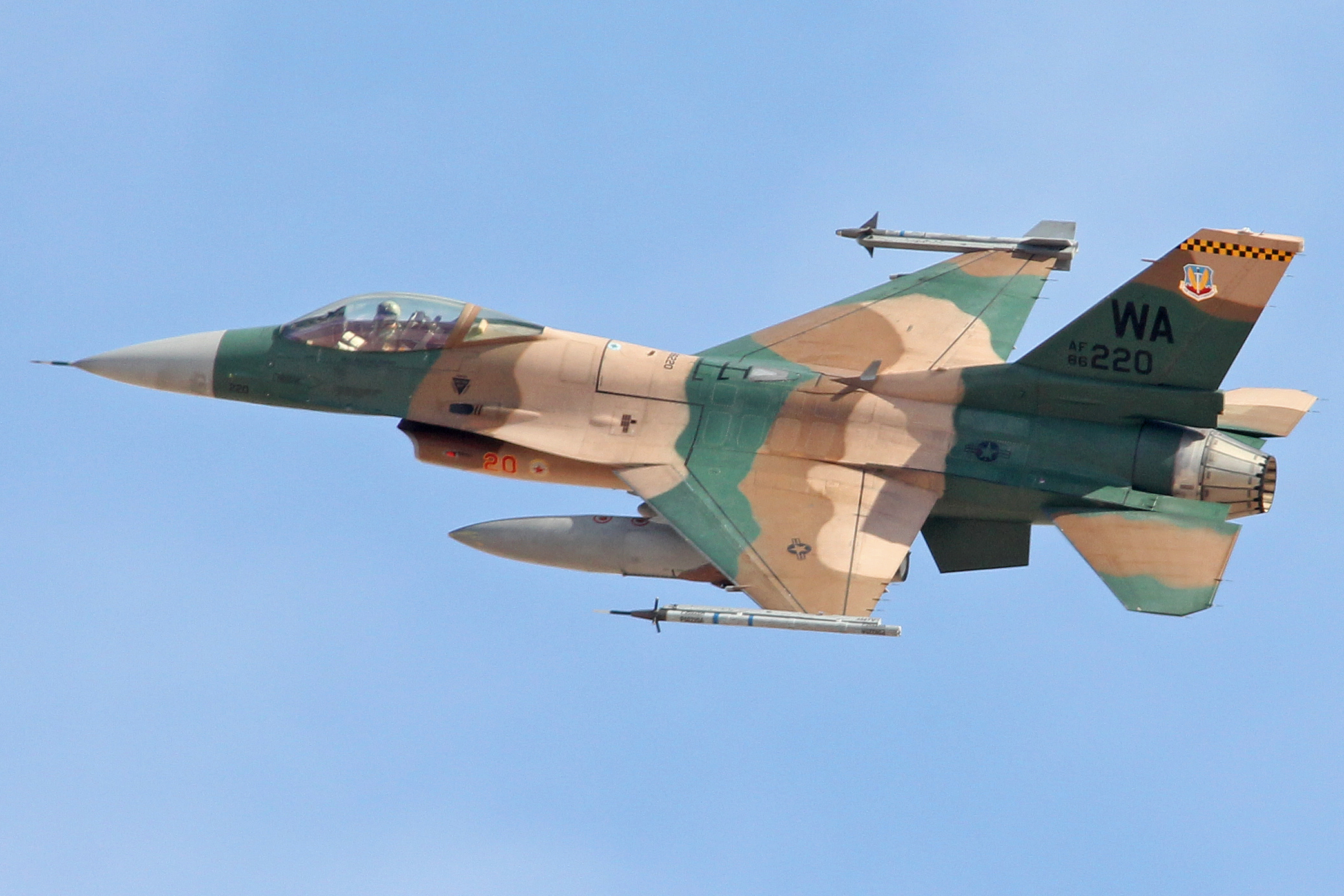
A USAF F-16C aggressor aircraft. The camouflage scheme emulates Soviet markings.

An aggressor squadron or adversary squadron (in the US Navy and USMC) is a squadron that is trained to act as an opposing force in military wargames. Aggressor squadrons use enemy tactics, techniques, and procedures to give a realistic simulation of air combat (as opposed to training against one's own forces). Since it is impractical to use actual enemy aircraft and equipment, surrogate aircraft are used to emulate potential adversaries.

The first formal use of dissimilar aircraft for training was in 1969 by the United States Navy Fighter Weapons School (better known as "Topgun"), which used the A-4 Skyhawk to simulate the performance of the MiG-17. The success of formalized dissimilar air combat training (DACT) led to transition of Navy Instrument Training Squadrons equipped with the A-4 into Adversary Squadrons at each master jet base. The United States Air Force followed suit with their first aggressor squadrons at Nellis AFB equipped with the readily available T-38 Talon.

== Origins ==
In the Second World War, the antagonists captured each other's aircraft and introduced them into a modest DACT role. The Germans created a unit known as "Touring Zirkus Rosarius" with captured P-51s, P-47s etc. that visited fighter bases and even let the senior pilots fly the adversary aircraft themselves. The RAF created No. 1426 Flight RAF with Luftwaffe captured fighters (Bf 109s and Fw 190s) that were fully tested and then taken to USAAF and RAF bases for familiarization training.

== United States ==
=== Domestically-made aircraft ===
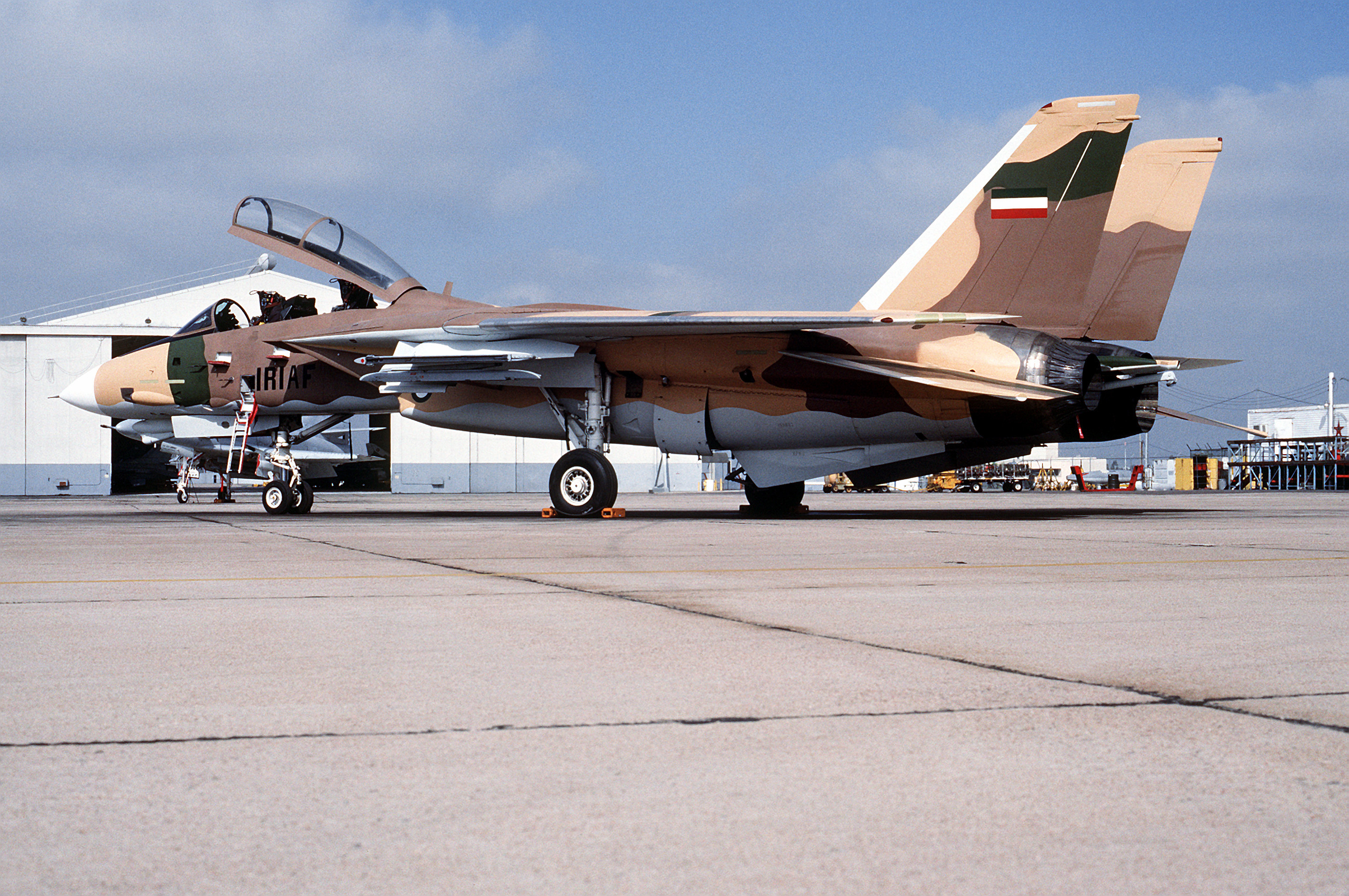
An F-14A Tomcat aircraft from the Navy Fighter Weapons School painted to resemble an Iranian F-14.

US aggressor squadrons fly small and low-wing loaded fighters that are used to represent those of the potential adversaries. Originally Douglas A-4s (US Navy) and Northrop F-5s (US Navy, Marines, and Air Force) were flown along with T-38 Talons that were immediately available and served as placeholders until new F-5E/F Tiger II aircraft were introduced.

These were eventually supplemented by early-model F/A-18As (US Navy), specially built F-16Ns (for the US Navy), and F-16A models (for the Air Force). At the end of 2005, the USAF started using the larger and faster F-15 Eagle as an aggressor aircraft alongside the F-16 at Nellis Air Force Base. However, the USAF began phasing out its F-15 aggressors towards the end of 2014. With the deactivation of the 65th Aggressor Squadron, the F-16C became the only dedicated aggressor type at Nellis AFB until 2022, when the 65th was reactivated with the F-35A Lightning II. Nellis Air Force Base planned to further upgrade its fleet with more F-35s and F-22s to replicate adversaries' capabilities, specifically the Chinese fifth-generation fighters.

=== Foreign-made aircraft ===
Foreign aircraft have been used as aggressors in the United States, most notably the Israeli Kfir fighter, designated F-21 in its use as an adversary asset. Actual Soviet MiG-17s, MiG-21s, and MiG-23s have also been flown by the US Air Force as aggressors over the Nellis ranges, under the Constant Peg program. The US Army operates eleven Soviet or Russian aircraft for adversary training, including Mi-24s, Mi-8s, Mi-2s, and An-2s.

German MiG-29 aircraft were regular visitors to the United States before being sold to Poland and participated in valuable DACT training at Nellis AFB as well as NAS Key West in addition to providing details to overseas locations or hosting US squadrons in Germany. One MiG-29 was loaned to the US for evaluation providing insight in the threat technology.

The Navy and Marine Corps briefly operated 2 squadrons of F-21 Kfir adversaries at NAS Oceana (VF-43) and Marine Corps Air Station Yuma (VMFT-401). This started in 1985 up through the 1990's when the planes were taken out of aggressor service.

=== Aggressor performances ===
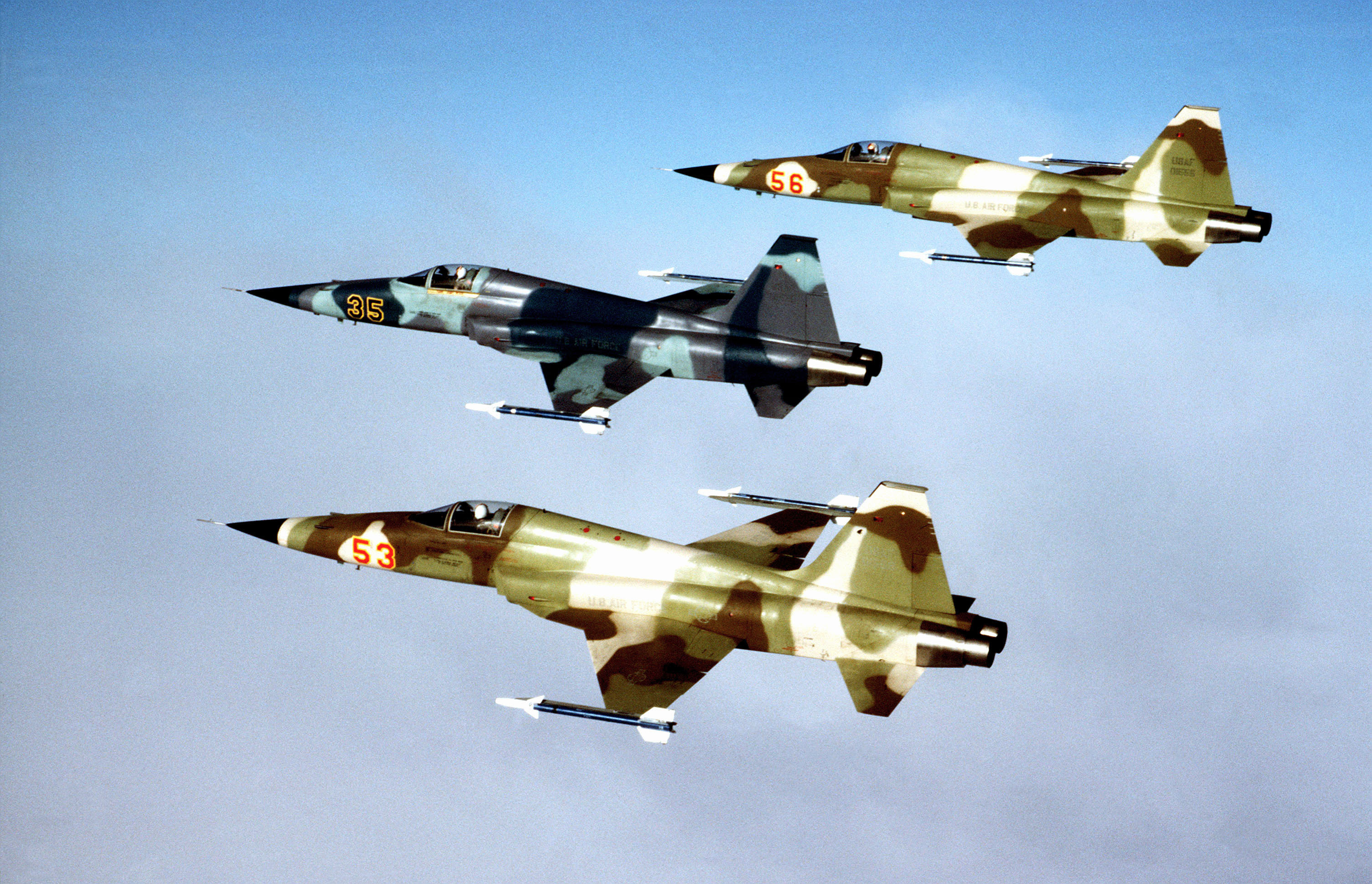
Three F-5E Tiger II from the 527th Tactical Fighter Training Aggressor Squadron.

While aircraft used for the aggressor role are usually older jet fighters, this has not always been the case. During the mid-1980s, the US Navy determined that the A-4s and F-5s flown at Top Gun were not adequate in simulating the air-to-air capabilities of the newest Soviet fighters such as the MiG-29 and Su-27. At this point, the U.S. Navy held a competition for an adversary platform that could viably represent fourth-generation fighter threats embodied by the MiG-29, Su-27 and the Mirage 2000.

The competing airframes were the General Dynamics F-16C Falcon and the Northrop F-20 Tigershark. According to George Hall's "Top Gun," many instructors at the Navy Fighter Weapons School preferred that the Navy procure the F-20. One reason given was the similarity to the F-5E Tiger aircraft already used by Top Gun and the four active duty adversary squadrons (VF-43, VF-45, VF-126, and VFA-127). However, General Dynamics priced the Falcon for the Navy at below cost.

The F-16C won the competition and the F-20 failed to win another order. This, compounded with other lost contracts, led to the demise of the F-20 program and the elimination of one more competitor for the F-16 in the worldwide fighter market. The F-16C as procured by the Navy was equipped with the lighter AN/APG-63 radar set as flown in the F-16A and had a titanium wing spar as in other F-16s. It was not equipped with the M61 Vulcan gun system and had twin lens pods on both sides of the intake to enlarge the relatively small radar cross section of the F-16.

Any equipment not necessary for visual-range aerial combat was removed, enhancing their agility and dog-fighting abilities. These F-16s were designated F-16N, and twenty-two single seat aircraft and four twin seat, designated the TF-16N, were built for the US Navy and flown at its famous "TOPGUN" Navy Fighter Weapons School starting in 1987. They were also flown by VF-43, VF-45 and VF-126, which were still active duty Adversary squadrons at the time.

Despite the airframe being strengthened to cope with the continuous high-G loads associated with air combat maneuvering, cracks were detected on the wings after only a few years of operation, leading to grounding of the Navy F-16 fleet by 1992 and complete retirement of the F-16N by 1994. In 2002, the Navy began to receive fourteen F-16A and F-16B models from AMARC at Davis-Monthan AFB that were brand new aircraft originally intended for Pakistan, but had been embargoed. All 14 are operated by NSAWC for use by TOPGUN in addition to the F/A-18A aircraft already in operation at NAS Fallon.

Aggressor aircraft in the United States are typically painted in colorful camouflage schemes, matching the colors of many Soviet aircraft and contrasting with the gray colors used in most operational US combat aircraft. Camouflage schemes that consist of many shades of blue (similar to those used in Sukhoi fighters) or of green and mostly-light brown (similar to the colors used in many Middle Eastern countries' combat aircraft) are most common.

=== Squadrons ===
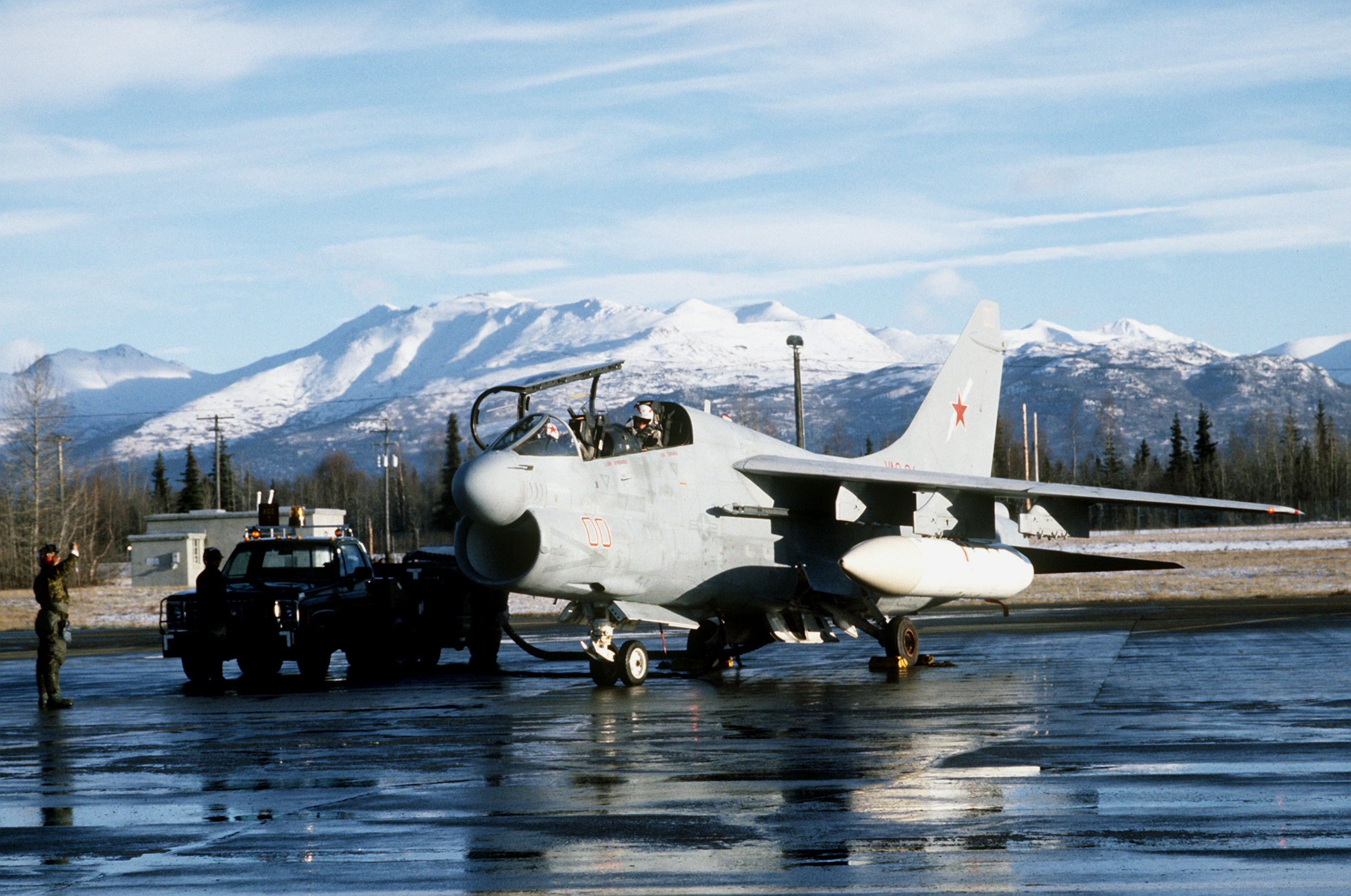
A US Navy Vought EA-7L Corsair II aircraft with a Soviet star and red numbers.

Aggressor squadrons in the US armed forces include the USAF 18th Aggressor Squadron at Eielson AFB, the 64th, the 65th Aggressor Squadrons at Nellis AFB, the US Marine Corps' VMFT-401 at MCAS Yuma and VMFT-402 at Marine Corps Air Station Beaufort, and the US Navy's VFC-12 at NAS Oceana, VFC-13 at NAS Fallon, VFC-111 at NAS Key West and VFC-204 at Naval Air Station Joint Reserve Base New Orleans, as well as the famous "TOPGUN" Naval Fighter Weapons School (US Navy) which is not a squadron per se, but operates F-16A/C/D and F/A-18E/F aircraft as part of the Naval Air Warfare Development Center (NAWDC) at NAS Fallon.

With the exception of the NSAWC aircraft, all the US Navy and US Marine Corps adversary squadrons are Reserve Component units and aircraft belonging to the Navy Reserve and the Marine Corps Reserve.

The USAF also operated Aggressor squadrons in the UK and in the Philippines. The 527 AS was a USAFE unit that first operated out of the former RAF Alconbury near Cambridge, England, then later from the former RAF Bentwaters near Ipswich. The 527th initially flew F-5s, then later switched to F-16s. They trained over the North Sea and in Germany, Spain and Italy. The PACAF counterpart, the 26th Training Aggressor Squadron, operated F-5s out of the former Clark Air Base near Angeles City, Philippines.

== Canada ==
The Canadian Forces Air Command operated CF-5 (both single- and two-seat) aircraft in the "adversary" role, by 419 Squadron at Canadian Forces Base Cold Lake, Alberta. These wore quasi-Warsaw Pact colours similar to those worn by USAF/USN aircraft. This role ended with the retirement of the CF-5 in 1995.

Since 2005, the Canadian Forces has employed civilian contractor Top Aces to provide aggressor services utilising modernised Dassault/Dornier Alpha Jets, Lear 35s, and Douglas A-4 Skyhawks. These aircraft are flown by highly experienced retired and current RCAF pilots, based out of CFB Cold Lake, CFB Bagotville, Victoria, BC, and Halifax, NS.

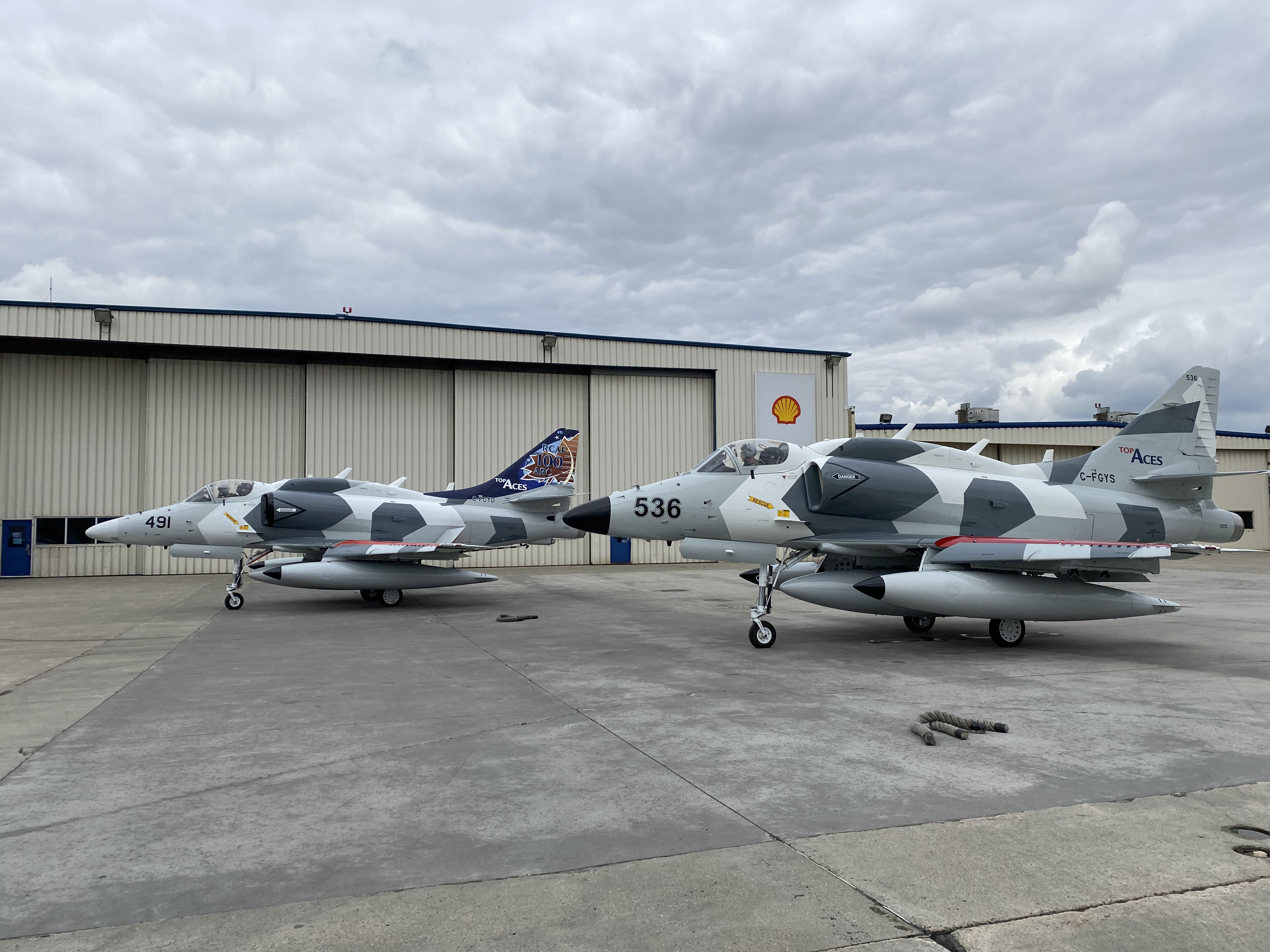
Upgraded A-4N Skyhawks owned by Canadian defence contractor Top Aces.

414 Squadron operated the CF-100, CT-133, CC-117 and EF-101 in the electronic warfare (EW) adversary role from CFB North Bay, Ontario, until 2002. The squadron re-formed in 2009, again in the EW adversary role, based in Ottawa, Ontario, flying aboard contracted Top Aces aircraft. They provide adversary training to the RCAF and RCN in both jamming and threat replication. The squadron has previously supported Canadian Army air defense units, but with the retirement of the ADATS platform this role was discontinued.

Fleet support squadrons VU-32 and VU-33 sometimes filled an adversary role, using their CT-133s to simulate sea-skimming missiles, such as the Exocet, for the Canadian Forces Maritime Command's vessels.

== China ==
The Flight Test and Training Centre (FTTC) is located at Cangzhou. FTTC is organized into 3 regiments which simulate enemy aircraft.

- The 1st FTTC Regiment operates J-10A/AS and the JL-9.
- The 2nd FTTC Regiment operates J-7E, J-8D/F, and JL-9.
- The 3rd Regiment operates Su-30MKK.

In 2011, the 3rd Regiment of the FTTC traveled to Pakistan to exercise with the Pakistani Air Force.

== United Kingdom ==
The United Kingdom maintained two units to undertake the aggressor role, both of which operated the BAE Hawk, No. 100 Squadron RAF and 736 Naval Air Squadron It was announced in July 2021 that apart from the Red Arrows, all other Hawk T1 aircraft in the British military would be retired and these two squadrons disbanded on 31 March 2022. On 28 March 2022, the RAF announced that a six-year contract to provide these services, now known as the Interim Red Air Aggressor Training Service (IRAATS) was awarded to Draken Europe using a fleet of Aero L-159 ALCA Honey Badgers and Dassault Falcon 20s.

== Japan ==
The Tactical Fighter Training Group was established in 1981. It used Mitsubishi T-2 aircraft as aggressors. Since 1990 it has used Mitsubishi F-15J/DJ aircraft. It is based at Komatsu Air Base in Ishikawa Prefecture.

== Taiwan ==
The 46th Imaginary Enemy Squadron of the Republic of China Air Force was established in 1972 under the guidance of the US Military Assistance Advisory Group in Taiwan. It used the F-86 Sabre aircraft from 1972 to 1977, the F-5A/B Freedom Fighter from 1977 to 1981, and now it uses F-5E/F Tiger II fighters as aggressors. The squadron is located at the Zhi-Hang Air Base in Taitung.

== Turkey ==
Established in 1966 and restructured in 1992, 132nd Squadron of the Turkish Air Force, as defined by the unique "weapons and tactics" concept, which is a combination regular fighter, test flight and tactics development duties, it is the sole aggressor squadron of Turkey. The squadron is based at the Konya Air Base and operates F-16 Fighting Falcons since 2007.

== Pakistan ==
The No. 29 Squadron of the Pakistan Air Force is an elite adversary simulation unit established in January 2019 operating from PAF Base Mushaf, the squadron mainly utilizes F-16 Fighting Falcons. Operating under the Combat Commander's School (CCS) / Airpower Centre of Excellence (ACE), the squadron focuses on training frontline pilots through realistic, complex combat scenarios.

== Soviet Union ==
The Soviet Air Forces began a program known as the 1521st Center for Combat Employment, located in Mary, Turkmen SSR, in 1970. The program was prompted by the poor performance of Soviet-supplied aircraft in the Middle East and by the equivalent American programmes. Before that the Air Force units used some of its own planes in MV roles, the MV standing for Modyeliruyemyiy Vrag which translates as "simulated enemy".

The unit was also known as the 1521st Aviation Base, and consisted of 3 squadrons:

- Two squadrons took "aggressor" roles. Initially they operated the MiG-21bis and the MiG-23MLD, respectively. Later both were equipped with MiG-29, painted to make them look like the F-15 Eagle.
- A third squadron operated drones for target practice for the visiting Soviet Air Force units.

After the collapse of the Soviet Union, the unit remains part of the new Russian Air Force, although the base is under the jurisdiction of Turkmenistan. In August 1992, the MiG-29 of the aggressor unit were relocated to the Zherdevka airbase in Tambov Oblast, Russia. Those aircraft were later transferred to the Kazakhstan Air Force in 1995–1996.

== NATO and others ==
Reunified Germany inherited 24 MiG-29s from East German Air Force. They formed the JG73 "Steinhoff" squadron, that was partially used as Aggressor squadron. NATO air forces compared the Luftwaffe's Fulcrums with western types during NATO training exercises. Many western pilots were able to train combat tactics against a real Russian fighter flown by highly experienced pilots and to execute air-air-combats against 'the real thing'.

Between 1985 and the mid-nineties Norwegian Air Force 336th squadron was used in the aggressor role on numerous exercises and DACT courses.

In Italy since 2015 the Typhoon squadrons started cooperating with the 212° Gruppo (Squadron) that is responsible for Lead-In Fighter Training course and employs their T-346A Master advanced jet trainers in the Aggressors role. Italian Air Force Alenia Aermacchi T-346As belonging to the 61° Stormo deployed to Tactical Leadership Programme in the Aggressors role.

NATO integrated opposing force (IOPFOR) Program will mean privately owned lightweight fighters could provide an aggressor training service for NATO.

Egypt has recently established an Aggressor squadron Called "95 Aggressor Squadron" Operating F-16s Block 52s that were added lately.

The Israeli Air Force's aggressor squadron is 115 Squadron, also known as the Flying Dragon or Red Squadron. It is the sole IAF squadron to operate fixed-wing aircraft, helicopters and also ground-based assets. The unit also offers its services to other nations.

== New Zealand ==
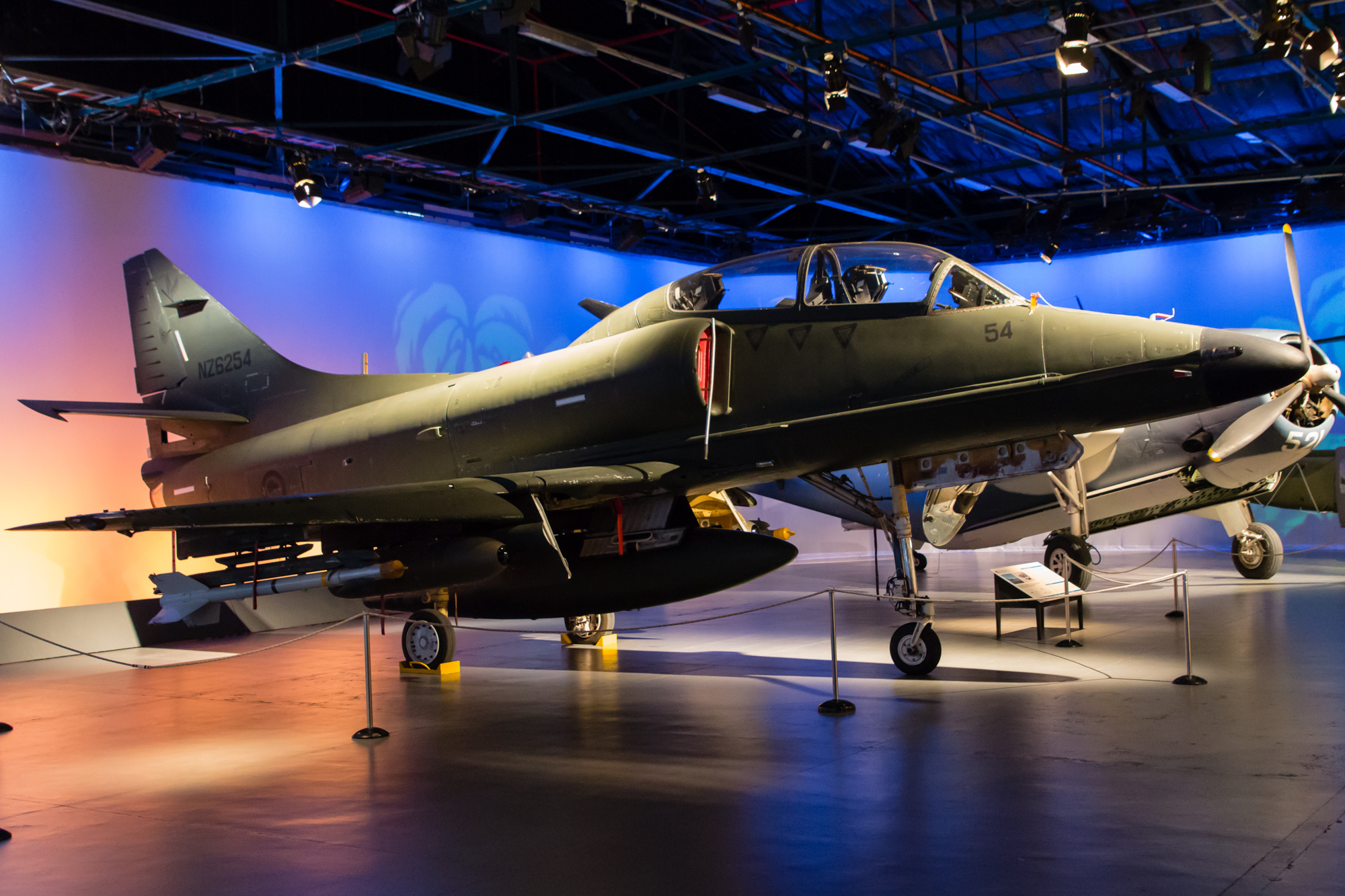
TA-4K Kahu Skyhawk, NZ6254 operated by both 75 and 2 Squadrons RNZAF

No. 2 Squadron RNZAF was moved to NAS Nowra, New South Wales, in February 1991. Their A-4K Kahu Skyhawks primarily served as targets for Royal Australian Navy air defences, but also were used in DACT with RAAF F/A-18 Hornets. The squadron was disbanded in December 2001.

== Private/outsourced aggressors ==
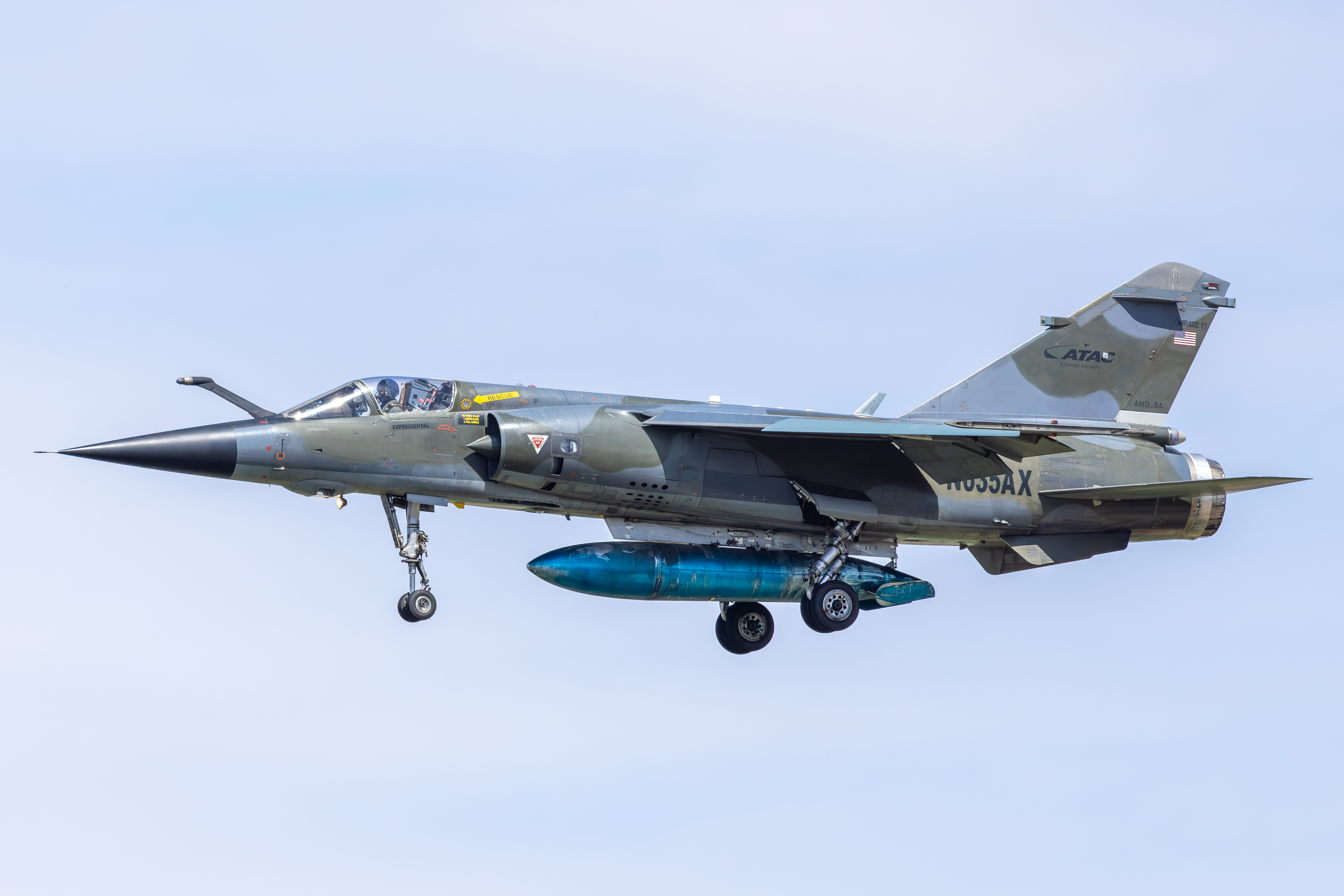
A Dassault Mirage F1CR of the Airborne Tactical Advantage Company, one of the civilian contractors flying ex-military jets in the adversary role, landing at Luke Air Force Base, Arizona, in 2023

Some aggressor missions do not require dogfighting, but instead involve flying relatively simple profiles to test the target acquisition and tracking capabilities of radars, missiles and aircraft. Some of these missions had been outsourced on short term or one-time contracts to private companies in the late 20th century. In the early 2000s, these programs began steadily evolving to include longer contracts and more advanced mission capabilities. Civilian contractors such as ATAC, Tactical Air Support, Top Aces, and Draken International are now flying advanced radar equipped aircraft in complex training missions including international large force exercises such as Red Flag, Maple Flag, Frisian Flag, and Tiger Meet. They utilize disarmed ex-military jets or small business jets such as the Lear 35, L-39, Alpha Jet, Hawker Hunter, Saab J35 Draken, BD-5J, IAI Kfir, A-4 Skyhawk, MiG-21, Mirage F1 and even the F-16 to simulate potential enemy aircraft and tactics. By outsourcing these missions, customer governments can save costs, save valuable airframe life on combat fleets, and benefit from the flexibility of civilian operations. They also get the benefit of continuing to draw on the expertise of the contracted pilots, most of whom are highly experienced weapons school graduates, being either retired or still serving officers concurrently flying in the Reserve, Air National Guard or equivalent.

== See also ==
- Vismod
