= Chinook Display Team =

RAF helicopter aerobatic team

Royal Air Force Chinook Role Demo Team
- Country: United Kingdom
- Allegiance: United Kingdom
- Branch: Royal Air Force
- Role: Aerobatic Display Team
- Size: 6 Air Crew; Engineering & Support Staff
- Part of: Joint Aviation Command
- Home Station: RAF Odiham
- Website: raf.mod.uk

Commanders
- Officer Commanding: Air Vice-Marshal Lee Turner
- Team Captain: Flt Lt Matthew Wehrle
- Team Manager: Flt Lt Sean Ahearne

Aircraft flown
- Helicopter: Boeing CH-47 Chinook

The Chinook Role Demo Team is an aerobatics display team in the Royal Air Force based at RAF Odiham. The team flies the UK variant Boeing CH-47 Chinook, and is composed of volunteers from front-line aircrew who train and execute air show performances between day-to-day primary military duties. Their regular performances are popular due to public support for the Chinook's military role, its recognisability, and the variation in display and manoeuvres it provides to air shows.

== Background ==
The Royal Air Force's 60 UK-variant Boeing CH-47 Chinooks are based at RAF Odiham in Hampshire. (Note: One Chinook, with air and ground crews from Nos 7, 18 and 27 Squadrons is also operated from Mount Pleasant in the Falkland Islands in support of the chopper.) This is the largest fleet of Chinooks outside those operated by the United States Army. The aircraft is capable of carrying up to 55 troops and 10 tonnes of mixed cargo.

Unlike the RAF's dedicated aerobatic display teams, such as the Red Arrows and Battle of Britain Memorial Flight, the RAF Chinook Role Demo Team is composed of volunteers from front-line aircrew, who continue day-to-day primary military duties whilst training and executing air show appearances. In 2013, the team were serving in Afghanistan, while continuing to provide displays at air shows. Similarly, the aircraft the team fly are operational aircraft first, and are primarily used for training, resupply, trooping, and battlefield casualty evacuation.

In 2018, RAF Odiham received a new £53m Lockheed Martin helicopter training flight simulator, greatly reducing the training costs for Chinook crews, including the Chinook Role Demo Team.

== Displays ==
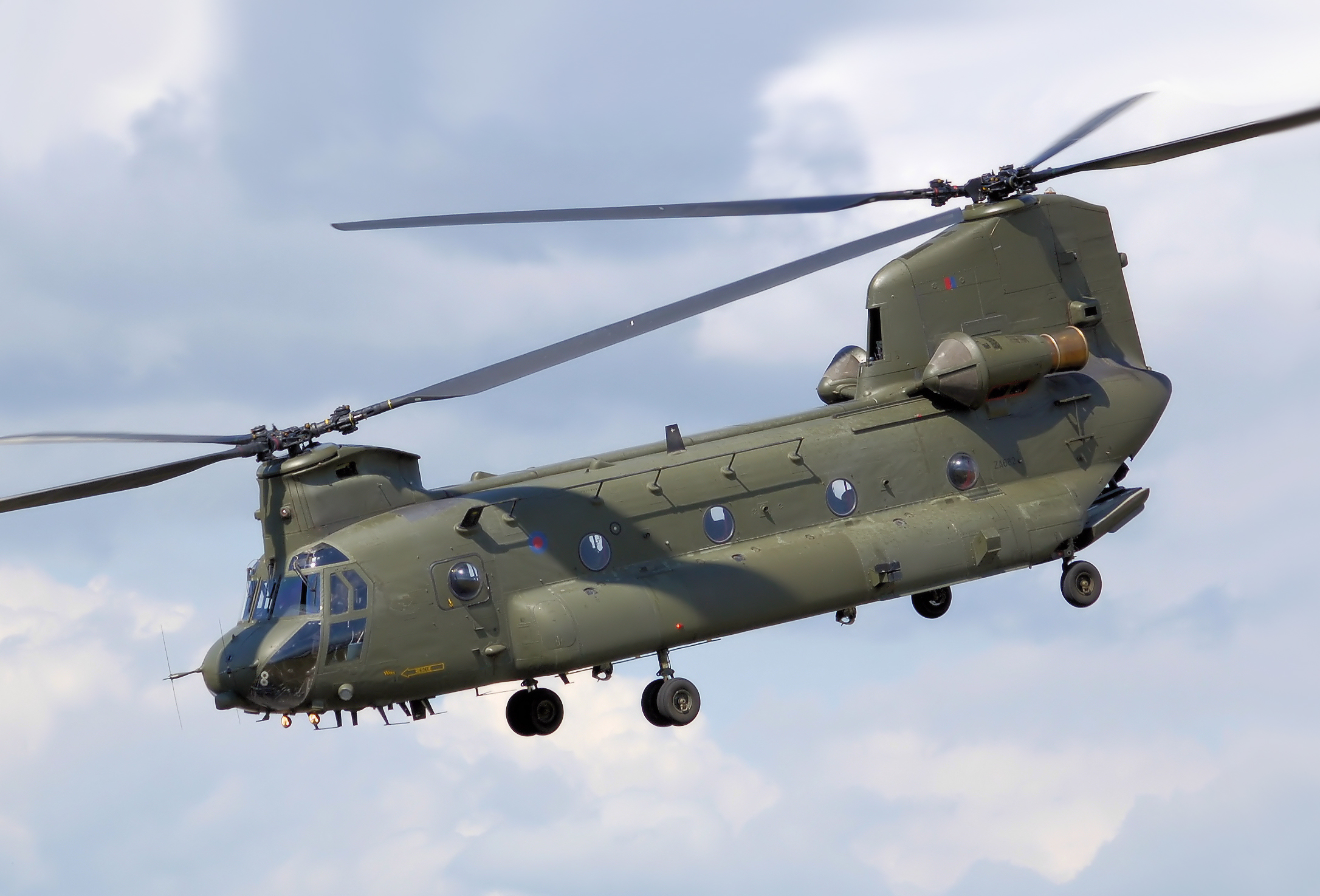
Chinook HC2 displaying at Kemble Air Day, UK

Solo Chinook shows returned to the UK display circuit in 2004 after a 12-year absence under the name 'Chinook Display Team'. Since then, the team has made regular appearance at air shows, where their manoeuvres include the "Rollercoaster" – a series of steep climbs and dives at an angle of up to 70 degrees.

At the Duxford Air Show in 2019, the team used Chinook ZA708. This was built in 1981 and has had extensive operational service, including overseas deployments in which it saw action and suffered combat damage. Built originally to Helicopter, Cargo Mark 1 (HC1) specification, it has been upgraded to the latest specification. To maintain its life and operational serviceability, the sequence performed at airshows is carefully choreographed and regulated to minimise stress to the airframe.

In 2018 and 2019, the Display Team partnered with Land Rover for support. The vehicle wrap – which was Chinook-themed and was designed by a member of the aircrew. As one site noted: "This project was completed within the Ministry of Defence and not under Dynamic Vectors. It serves only as an illustration of what some of our designers can do."

In 2018, in conjunction with the 100th anniversary of the RAF, the Display Team made a notable appearance at the Battle of Britain Memorial.

In 2023 the team was re-named the 'Chinook Role Demonstration Team' to better reflect the team and aircraft's primary role as an operational unit. Key elements were introduced to showcase the aircraft's full capability, including internal loading, under-slung loads, and trooping. This included partnering with Joint Helicopter Support Squadron, another Joint Aviation Command Unit, based at RAF Benson.

The Team's popularity has been attributed to the Chinook's high-profile role gained from evacuating injured personnel during the Afghanistan conflict, its recognisability, unexpected agility, and the display variation it provides in contrast to smaller, faster aircraft.

== Team Members ==
The team typically comprises 6 aircrew; a captain, two co-pilots, a lead crewman, and two additional crewman, rotating the co-pilot and junior crewmen positions during the season. A significant number of ground crew are also drawn to support, including engineering, operations, survival equipment, and media personnel.

In recent years the team has been captained by the following pilots:

- 2018: Flight Lieutenant Stuart Kynaston (27 Sqn)
- 2019: Squadron Leader Jon Turner (18 Sqn)
- 2020 - 2022: Flight Lieutenant Matthew Smyth (27 Sqn)
- 2023: Flight Lieutenant James Hobkirk (18 Sqn)
- 2024: Flight Lieutenant Ian Cooper (18 Sqn)
- 2025: Flight Lieutenant Cal Pearson (7 Sqn)
- 2026: Flight Lieutenant Matthew Wehrle (18 Sqn)

== See also ==
- Battle of Britain Memorial Flight
- Typhoon Display Team
