= Vismod =

Modifications for simulating enemy equipment

A vismod (abbreviation of visually modified or visual modification) is a vehicle, aircraft, or other object that has been altered to simulate military equipment used by an enemy force, in order to make military exercises more realistic. "Vismod" also refers to the specific alterations made for this purpose. The term is used by the elements of the United States Department of Defense, who use vismod during training, sometimes with specialized OpFor (opposing force) military units. Vismod is also sometimes used in filmmaking and television production to simulate real-world military equipment required for a scene that cannot be procured due to financial or other complications.

== Use in the US Navy and US Air Force ==
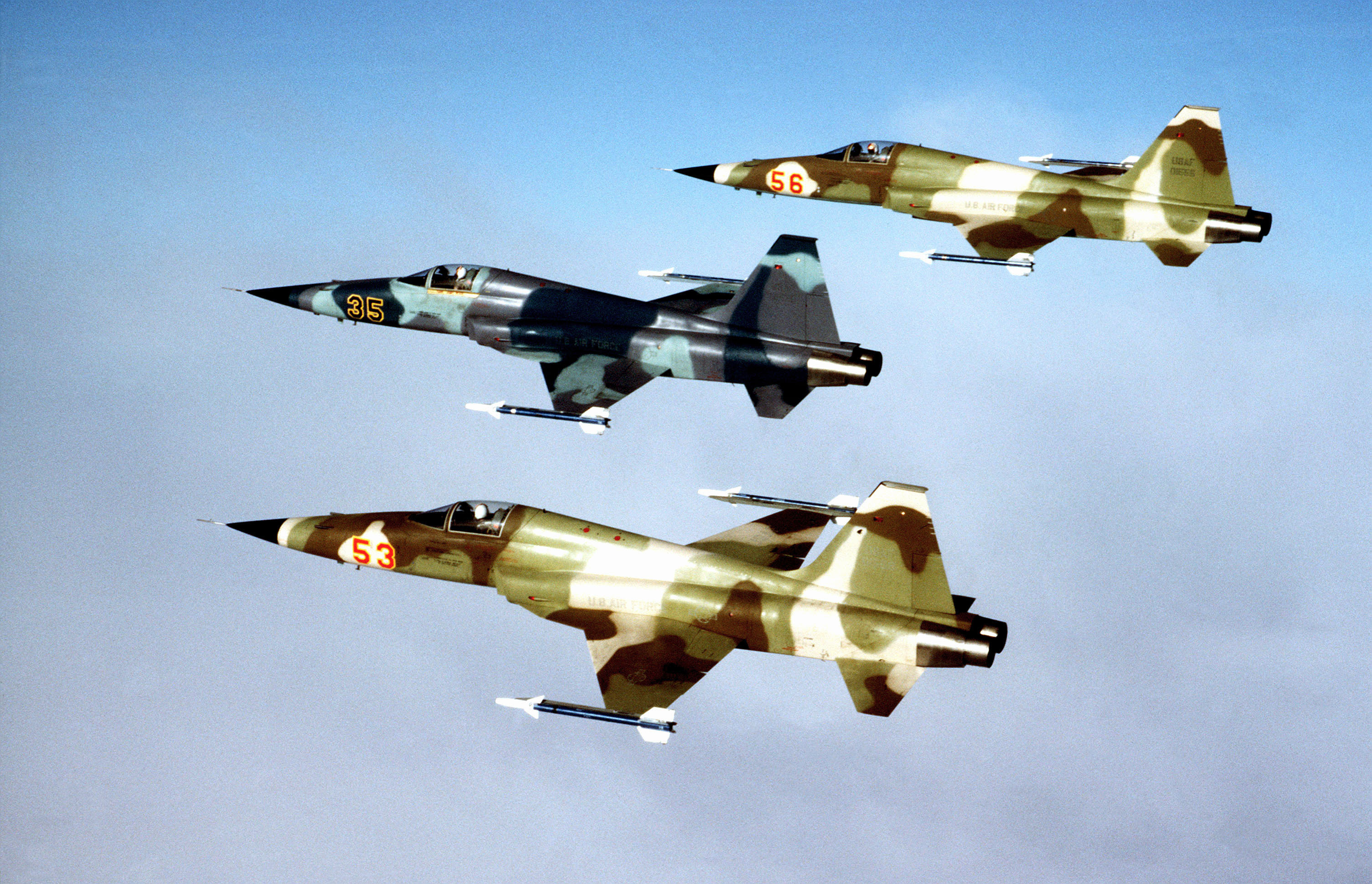
A trio of F-5E Tiger II's flying in simulated Soviet paint schemes and markings as part of an Air Force aggressor squadron

The United States Navy and Air Force were the first branches of the military to use vismods effectively for training purposes in response to appalling air-to-air combat performance of their pilots during the Vietnam War, taking A-4 Skyhawks and F-5 Freedom Fighters and painting them in the colors of Soviet and Warsaw Pact aircraft, complete with red star insignia.

These were used as 'adversary' aircraft at the Navy's Top Gun program at Marine Corps Air Station Miramar and the Air Force's RED FLAG exercises at Nellis Air Force Base. Top Gun was later replaced by the Naval Strike and Air Warfare Center at Naval Air Station Fallon. These aircraft were later supplemented and eventually replaced by F/A-18 Hornets, F-14 Tomcats, and F-16 Fighting Falcons, with the Air Force recently adding F-15 Eagles.

== Use in the US Army ==
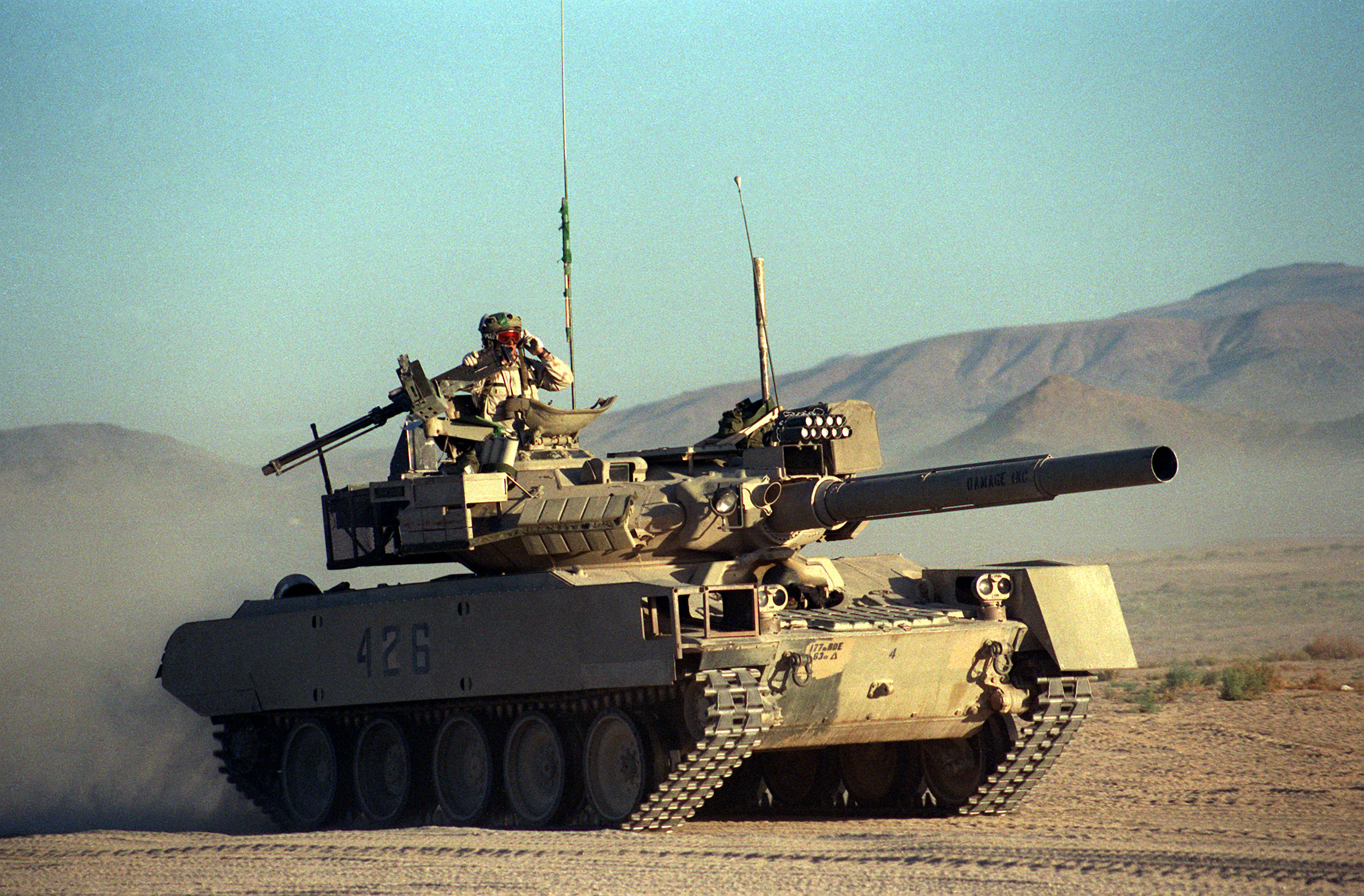
An M551 Sheridan visually modified to resemble a T-80.

Following the example set by the Navy and Air Force, the United States Army developed the National Training Center at Fort Irwin, California. Due to the complex and intricate nature of modern mechanized warfare, the vismods used here cover a wide range of ground vehicles and even helicopters (UH-1 Hueys made to resemble the Mil Mi-8, for example), fitted with MILES gear.

The most common vismods were M551 Sheridan light tanks which were dressed up to resemble Russian-made tanks and Infantry Fighting Vehicles such as the T-72 and BMP-1 and Humvees made to resemble BRDM-2 scout vehicles. As the Sheridans aged and grew harder and more inefficient to maintain, they were replaced with M113 armored personnel carriers and M1 Abrams tanks.

Similar vismod-equipped units operate at the Joint Readiness Training Center at Fort Johnson, Louisiana.

== Use in film and television production ==
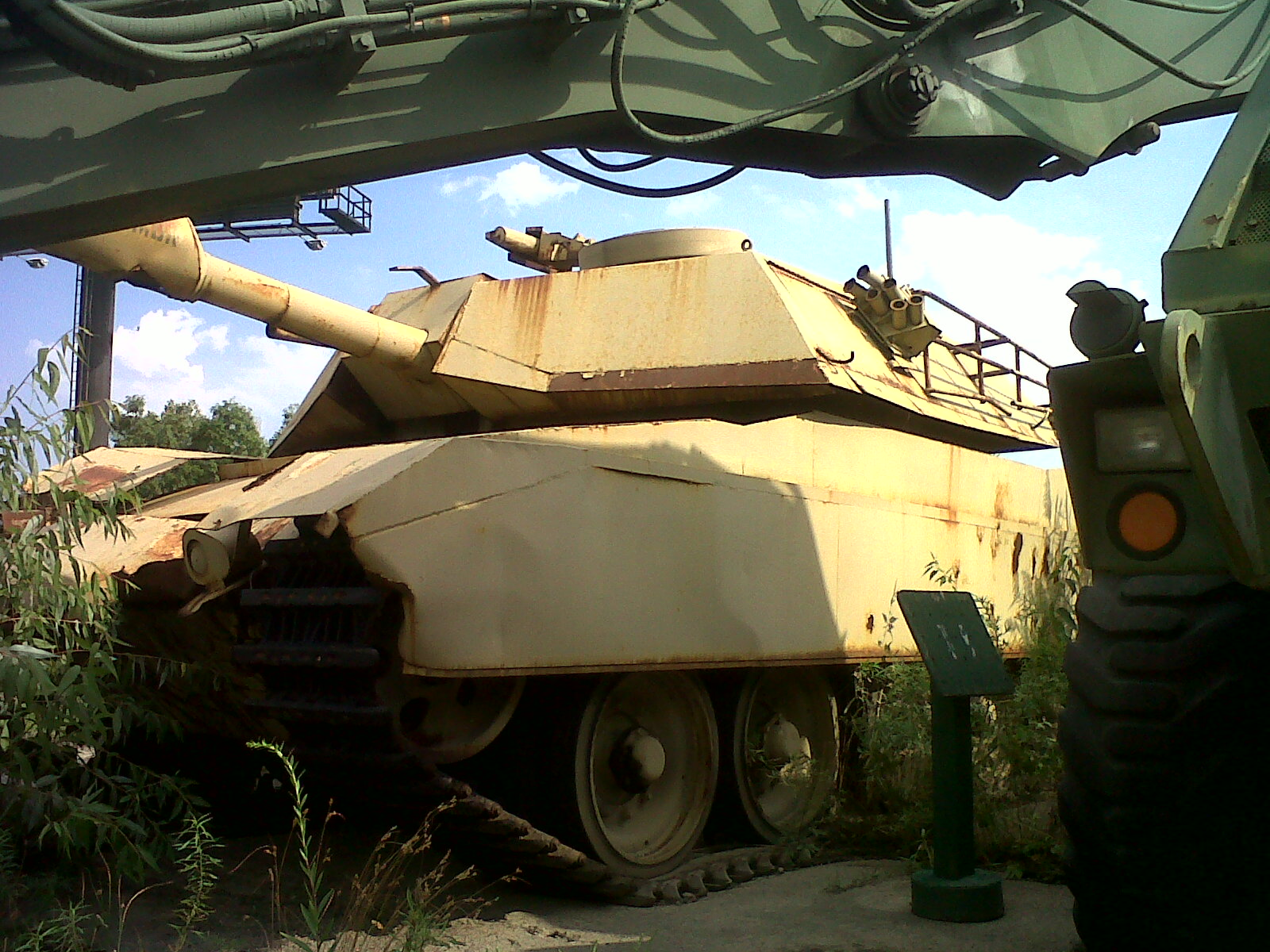
A Centurion tank visually modified to resemble an M1A1 Abrams for the film Courage Under Fire

In some cases, vismods are used to simulate real-world military hardware that would be too expensive or otherwise impractical to procure for filming. Hollywood vismods have covered a wide range of vehicles, from aircraft (such as an Aérospatiale Puma made to resemble an Mi-24 Hind) to ground vehicles (Centurion tanks made to resemble M1 Abrams), and even small arms, such as Chinese-made Type 56 assault rifles being visually modified to resemble Soviet-made AKM or AK-74 rifles. Some of the more notable Hollywood vismod examples include Red Dawn and Courage Under Fire.

== See also ==
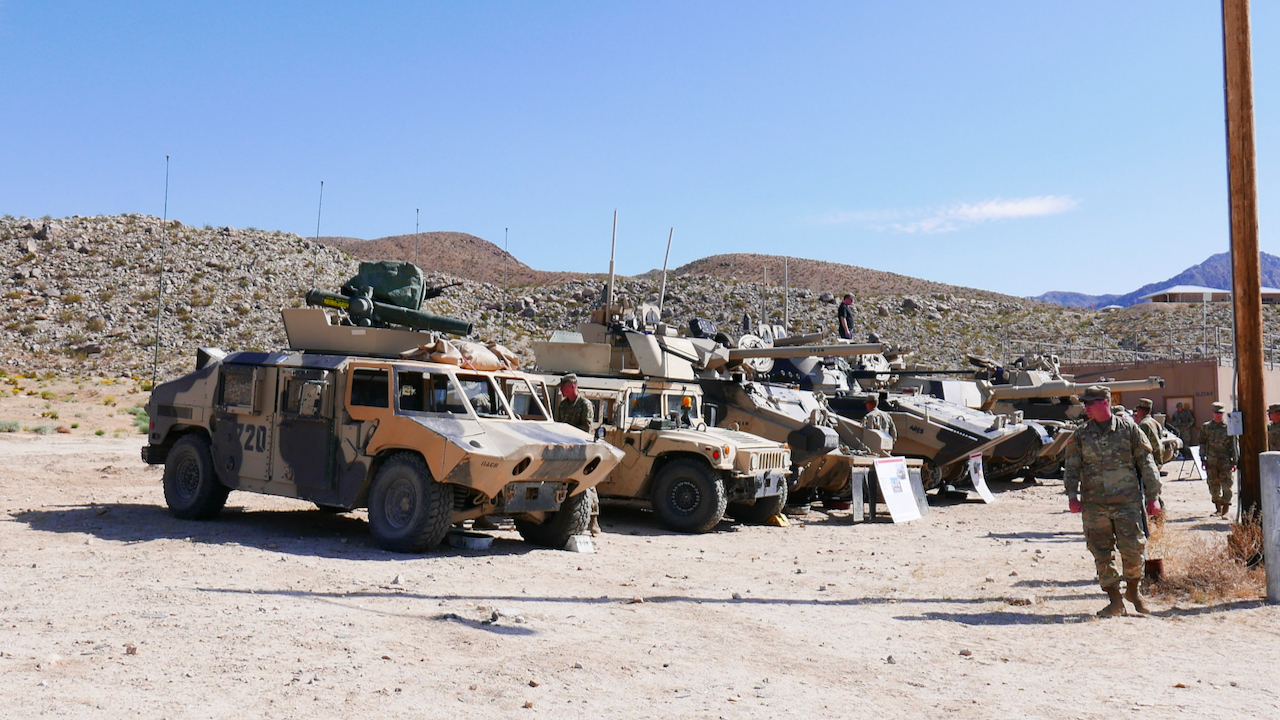
US Army vehicles visually modified for OPFOR training at Fort Irwin

- Opposing Force
- National Training Center
- Navy Fighter Weapons School
- Joint Readiness Training Center
- Naval Strike and Air Warfare Center
- RED FLAG exercise
- Multiple Integrated Laser Engagement System
- Wargaming
- Aggressor squadron
