= 132nd Squadron (Turkey) =

132nd Weapons & Tactics Squadron "Daggers"
- 132'nci Silah ve Taktikler Filosu "Hançerler"
- Active: 1966 – 1990; 1992 – present
- Country: Turkey
- Branch: Turkish Air Force
- Role: Fighter; Test flight Aggressor; Aerobatic demonstration
- Part of: Combatant Air Force: 3rd Main Jet Base Command
- Garrison/HQ: Konya Air Base
- Motto(s): Sun to the friend, fear to the enemy.

Aircraft flown
- Fighter: F-16C Block 50 Fighting Falcon

132nd Squadron "Daggers" is a fighter squadron of the Turkish Air Force specialized in the development of courses for the efficient use of weapons and tactics. It also serves aggressor duties mainly during NATO exercises.

The squadron also consists of SoloTürk, the air force's aerobatic demonstration team. On the contrary to the Turkish Stars, this squadron is only differentiated by its livery. Aside that, SoloTürk aircraft are capable of regular fighter duties and carried out many operations throughout the years.

== History ==
The squadron was first established in 1966 at Çiğli Air Base, where the Air Training Command is located, as a regular training squadron and it had little to no role in combat. The squadron then received F-4 Phantoms in 1987 to carry out lead-in fighter training duties. Following the quick acquisition of F-4 Phantoms with minimal training and preparedness, because of the Cyprus Crisis, the air force failed in getting accustomed to the use and maintenance of F-4 Phantoms, and it resulted in the crash of over 15 aircraft until 1980. In 1989, as the Turkish Air Force suffered aircraft shortage after constant crashes, the squadron was temporarily shut down and its aircraft were allocated to combatant units.

Following its reintroduction in 1992, the squadron was moved to Konya Air Base, operating Northrop F-5s until 2007. While it was still a training squadron, its roles were eventually enlarged into the concept of "weapon and tactics", a combination of aggressor, test and tactics development tasks.

The squadron started using F-16 Fighting Falcons from 2007, as the Turkish Air Force gradually started retiring the existing Northrop F-5s in service, except for the Turkish Stars. In 2016, after the coup attempt, SoloTürk was moved to the Konya Air Base and restructured under the 132nd Squadron, as its parent unit, the 141st Squadron, was dissolved.

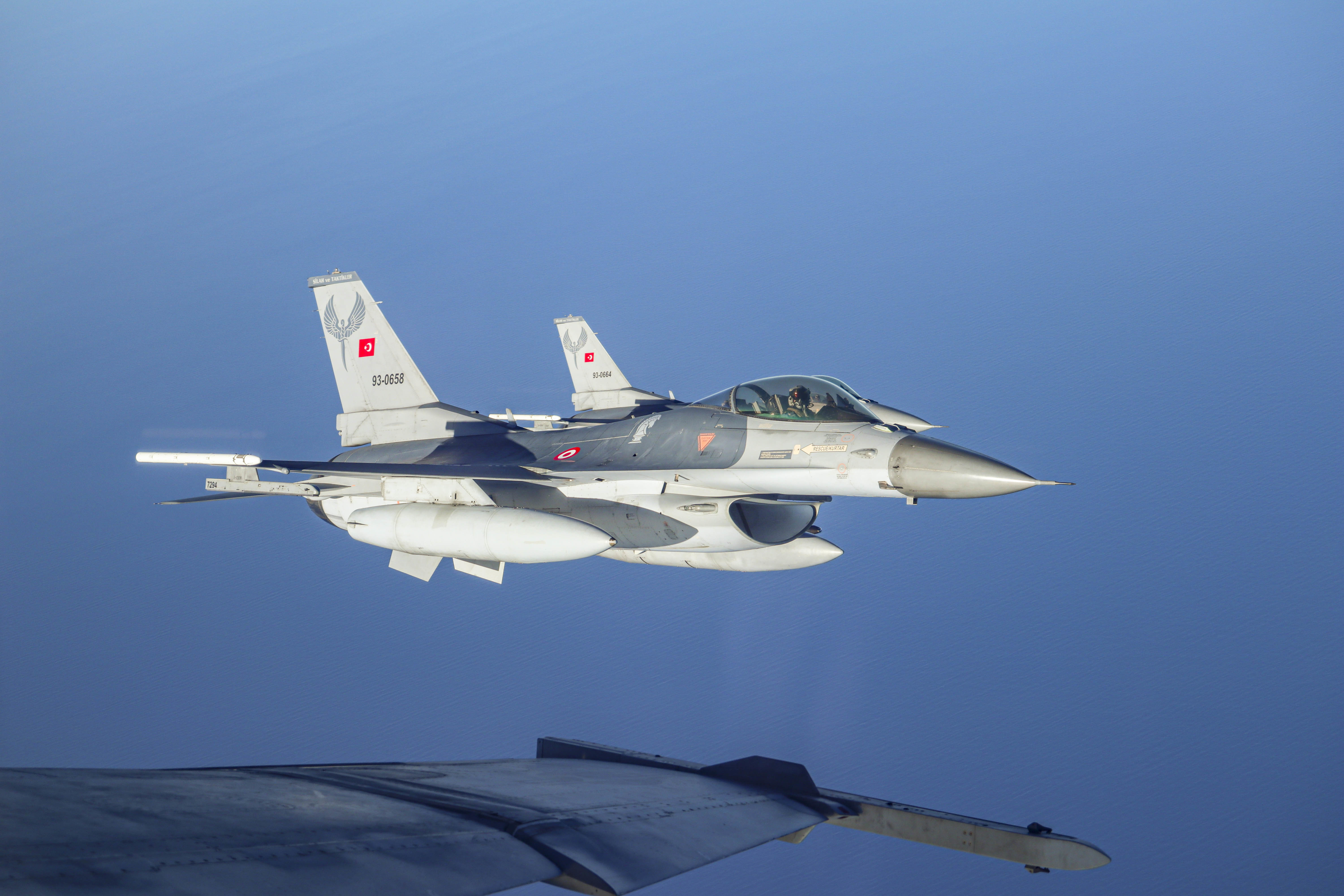
Two F-16Cs of the 132nd Squadron provide aerial protection for the Carrier Strike Group 8

By 2017, the squadron is tasked with providing aerial protection to the president of Turkey, and since then, two F-16s escort the flight. One year later, 12 F-16s of the squadron were deployed for the Operation Euphrates Shield, providing air support to military operation by bombarding many Syrian Democratic Forces and Islamic State positions. Reports suggest that the tactical bombing by the squadron killed 11, and injured 16.

== Lineage ==
=== Stations ===
- Çiğli Air Base, 1966 – 1990
- Konya Air Base, 1992 – present

=== Aircraft ===
- Cessna T-37 Tweet, 1966 – 1969
- Republic F-84F Thunderstreak, 1970 – 1974
- North American F-100 Super Sabre, 1975 – 1986
- McDonnell Douglas F-4 Phantom II, 1987 – 1990
- Northrop F-5, 1992 – 2006
- General Dynamics F-16 Fighting Falcon, 2007 – present
