= SoloTürk =

Turkish aerobatic demonstration team

SOLOTÜRK
- SOLOTÜRK badge
- Active: 25 November 2009 (16 years ago) formation 15 April 2011 (15 years ago) performances
- Country: Turkey
- Branch: Turkish Air Force
- Role: Aerobatic demonstration Team
- Size: 2 pilots 2 support personnel 9 maintenance personnel
- Garrison/HQ: Konya Air Base
- Colors: Golden; Black; Silver; White
- Mascot: Eagle

Aircraft flown
- Fighter: 3 General Dynamics F-16C Block 40
- Transport: 1 CASA CN-235M-100

SOLOTÜRK or often stylized as SoloTürk, is a single-aircraft aerobatic demonstration team of the Turkish Air Force's 132nd Squadron based at the Konya Air Base. Plans for the team began in November 2009 and the pilot training process was finalized in August 2010 with three pilots initially. The first demonstration flight was performed within the military in September 2010, and the team made its first public appearance 15 April 2011. Since then, SoloTürk has participated in several national and international airshows, with most maneuvers in demonstration flights being special to the team.

The team uses a specially-painted General Dynamics F-16C Block-30TM aircraft which is combat ready. SoloTürk formerly operated out of the Akıncı Air Base, but moved to Konya Air Base in 2016 after the coup attempt. The team has a total of 13 personnel, including two pilots, and uses a CASA CN-235M-100 for transportation. Pilots wanting to fly for the team must meet certain criteria before they qualify for a training. SoloTürk has received multiple awards for its demonstration flights.

== History ==
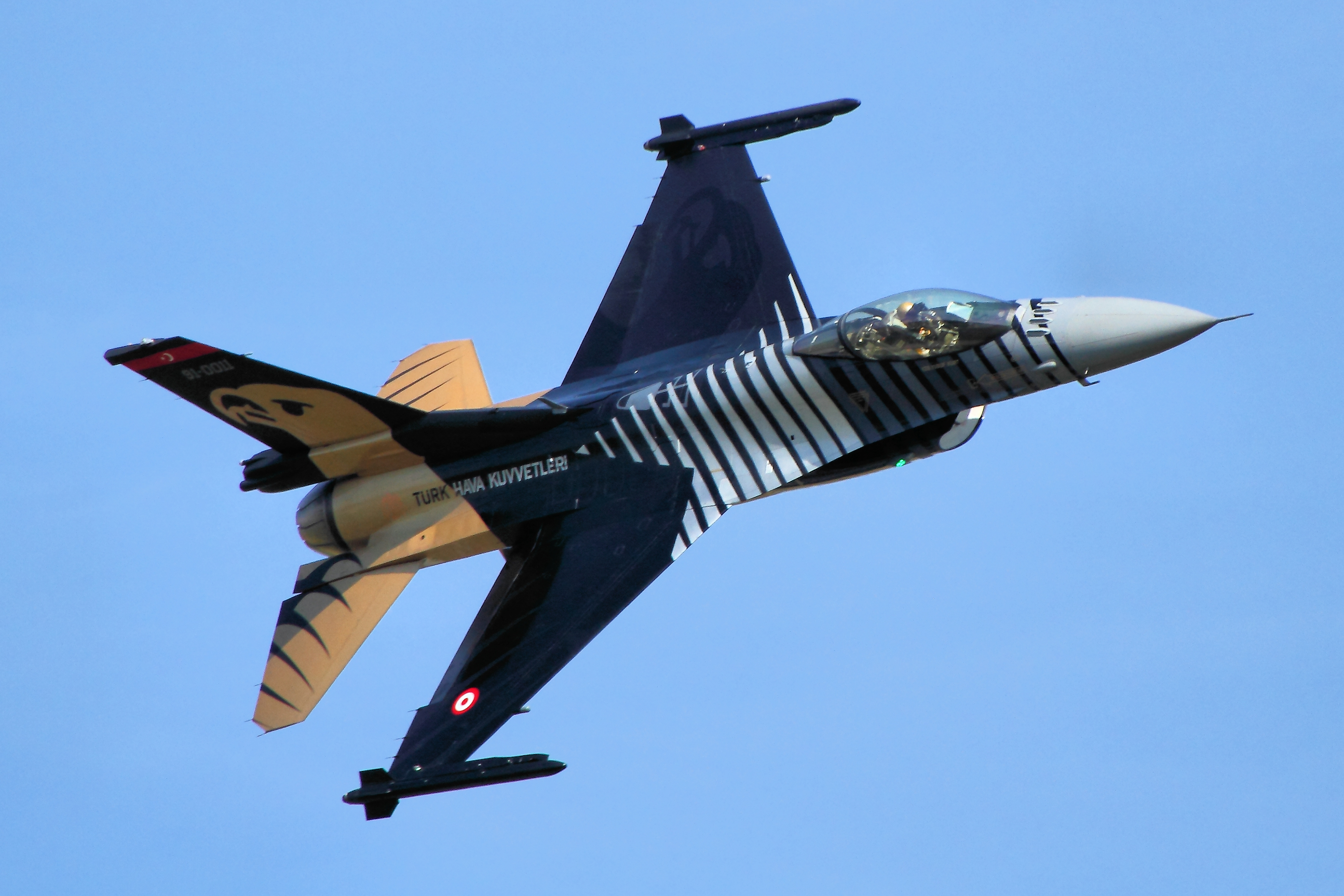
SoloTürk in 2014

The development of a one-aircraft aerobatic team started on 25 November 2009. The pilots were selected in January 2010 and training started in May the same year, which lasted three months. The first private display flight was performed on 1 September 2010 to then Turkish Air Force commander Hasan Aksay at the Akıncı Air Base in Ankara, where the team would be initially stationed at. The team made its first public appearance on 15 April 2011 at the Akıncı Air Base during the 100th anniversary event of the Turkish Air Force.

The Akıncı Air Base, which was the base of SoloTürk since its forming, was closed following the 2016 Turkish coup attempt as it was alleged that the base was used as the command center of pro-coup military. Demonstrations of SoloTürk were temporarily halted following the attempt as a safety measure. An internal investigation within the air force concluded that none of the members of SoloTürk were a part of the Gülen movement. The base of the team was moved to the Konya Air Base in October 2016 under the 132nd Squadron Command, where the aerobatic demonstration team Turkish Stars are also based at.

On 25 January 2017, pilots Erhan Günar and Serdar Doğan flew the SoloTürk F-16, which has a takeoff speed of 300 kilometres per hour (160 kn), at a speed of 180 kilometres per hour (97 kn) during a training flight in preparation of the coming year and broke the "slowest flight" record. At the inaugural Teknofest on 20 September 2018, a drag race was held between SoloTürk, Red Bull RB8, Kawasaki Ninja H2, Tesla Model S P100D, Aston Martin Vantage, Lotus Evora GT410 and Bombardier Challenger 600. The 9-second race was won by Kenan Sofuoğlu who was driving the Kawasaki Ninja H2. SoloTürk came third behind the Red Bull RB8 driven by Jake Dennis.

Before the start of the 2020 Turkish Grand Prix at the Istanbul Park circuit, SoloTürk made a fly-by on the main straight. Footage captured by a track-side cameraman showed that the unexpected and sudden sound of the aircraft scared several drivers who were walking down the straight without headphones. On 21 May 2022, pilot Emre Mert performed the cobra maneuver with the demonstration aircraft. With this, SoloTürk became the first team to perform this maneuver with a General Dynamics F-16.

At the end of 2024, several domestic demonstrations of both SoloTürk and the Turkish Stars were cancelled as part of austerity measures put in place by the Ministry of National Defense, including an appearance at the 9 September celebrations commemorating the Liberation of İzmir. During a demonstration flight at the 7th edition of Teknofest at Adana Şakirpaşa Airport on 3 October, the F-16 aircraft suddenly turned upside down at a very low altitude with the nose pointing down and came as close as "a small number of wingspans" to the crowd. The aircraft landed safely at Incirlik Air Base, and an expert team was sent to investigate the incident.

== Quick facts about the demonstration flights ==
A typical SoloTürk demonstration flight takes about 20 minutes, where the pilot makes about 20 maneuvers. According to Erhan Günar, one of the former pilots of the team, most of these are only performed by SoloTürk. For example: After retracting the landing gear following takeoff, the aircraft starts flying in inverse at an altitude of 10 metres (33 ft) just after reaching 300 knots and proceeds to climb in that position. Another example is the SoloTürk roll which is a special barrel roll done only by the SoloTürk team. In 2022, the SoloTürk cobra was also added to the demonstration package of the team. In this maneuver, the pilot transitions into 25 degrees angle of attack from the slow flight in just a moment and this looks like a prancing cobra from the viewer perspective. In a typical demo the plane flies at 100–600 knots (190–1,110 km/h) and above an altitude of 100 feet (30 m). Per demonstration flight, 3.5 tonnes of fuel is used. Pilots experience a maximum g-force of 9 during flights.

== Aircraft ==
=== Demonstration aircraft ===
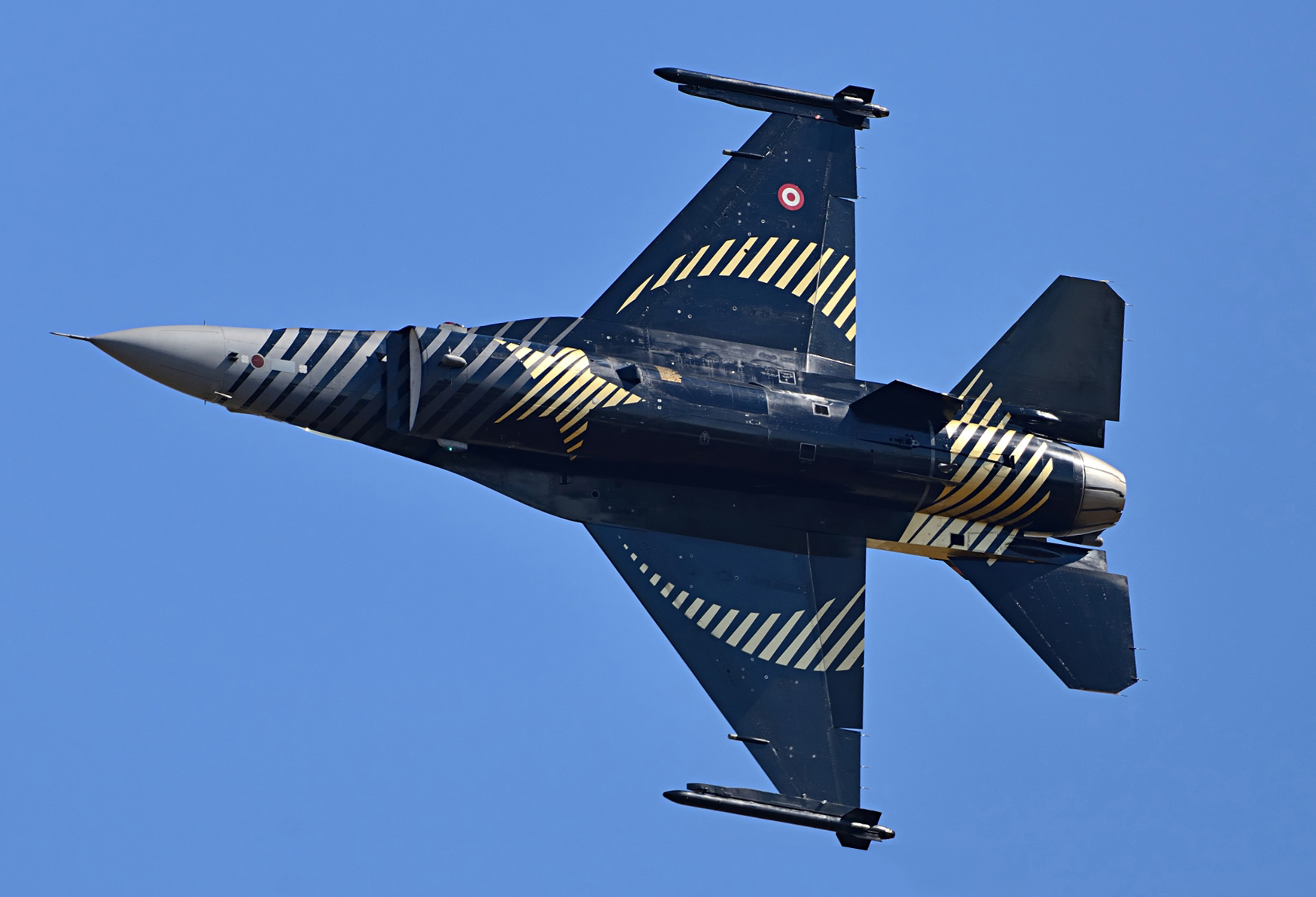
Bottom part of SoloTürk with the star and crescent

SoloTürk uses a General Dynamics F-16C Block 30-TM aircraft in its demonstration flights. The type was chosen because it is a highly maneuverable aircraft and because the F-16 uses a side-stick, which aids pilots in keeping the aircraft under control during high g-force maneuvers. Despite being painted in a special livery, the aircraft still has combat capabilities and is sometimes used in training and minor operations carried out by the Turkish Air Force under the 132nd Squadron Command. There is a reserve F-16 that is also transported to events should the main aircraft malfunction.

The livery was designed by Murat Dorkip. The star and crescent on the aircraft represents the value of the Turkish Air Force to the Republic of Turkey. The silver star on the plane symbolizes the goal of the Republic of Turkey and the Turkish Air Force to be the star of the 21st century, while the golden eagle on the tail symbolizes the freedom and determination in the spirit of the aviators. According to former SoloTürk pilot Erhan Günar, the black stripes found on the aircraft symbolize "how accurate and fast the Turkish Air Force and Turkish Armed Forces make their decisions".

=== Transport aircraft ===
Initially, the team used a CASA CN-235M-100 as its transport aircraft. In 2016, this aircraft was replaced by a Lockheed C-130 Hercules with serial number 63-13187. In October 2020, the team returned to using a CASA CN-235.

== Organization ==
=== Selection and training ===
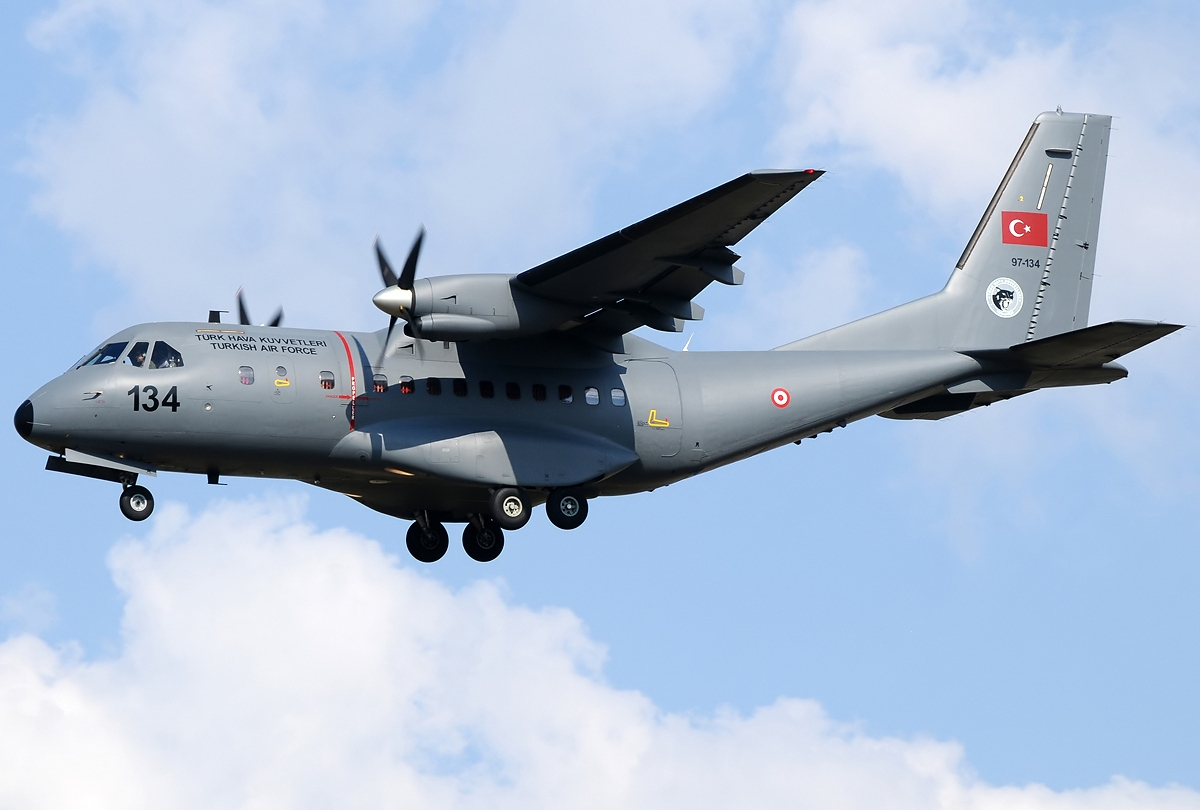
A CASA CN-235M-100 similar to this one provides support for SoloTürk

On 25 November 2009, the Turkish Air Force Command started the Flight with a Single F-16 Aircraft program to find pilots. Three pilots were selected on 14 January 2010: Murat Keleş, Fatih Batmaz and Sedat Yalın Ahbab. On 18 May 2010, Keleş became the first of the three to start his training. During training sessions, two additional pilots were present in the cockpit as observers. Keleş finished his training on 20 August 2010.

In an early 2021 interview with TRT Haber, pilot Emre Mert said that to become a SoloTürk pilot, "you must have flown an F-16 for over 500 hours, have no record of incidents and know a good level of English." Pilots can only start their training of three months which they will have to pass, after they meet these criteria and get selected. Later that year, pilot Murat Bakıcı told that there were specific "books and guidelines" on who could become a pilot, and said that the minimum required flight hours was one thousand.

=== Personnel ===
As of March 2023, the team consists of two pilots, two support personnel and nine maintenance personnel. The person talking during the demonstration flights is SoloTürk's press and public relations officer, First Lieutenant Ş. Alper Şen. The three initially selected pilots are no longer a part of SoloTürk. Murat Keleş left in 2012, Fatih Batmaz in 2013, while Sedat Yalın Ahbab left in 2014. As of February 2024, the two incumbent pilots flying the aircraft are Major Murat Bakıcı and Major M. Erhan Aydemir. Apart from demonstration flights, the pilots also participate in regular military missions of the Turkish Air Force.

== Awards ==
SoloTürk received its first award on 18 July 2011 at the Royal International Air Tattoo for having the "Best Demonstration Flight" of the airshow. In August 2017, the team received the same award at the Slovak International Air Fest, where the demonstration flight was watched by 300,000 people. At the Royal International Air Tattoo in 2018, the team received an award for having the "Best Solo Jet Demonstration Flight" of the airshow.

== See also ==
- F-16 Demo Team Zeus
