= Northrop F-5 =

US lightweight low-cost fighter aircraft

F-5A/B Freedom Fighter; F-5E/F Tiger II
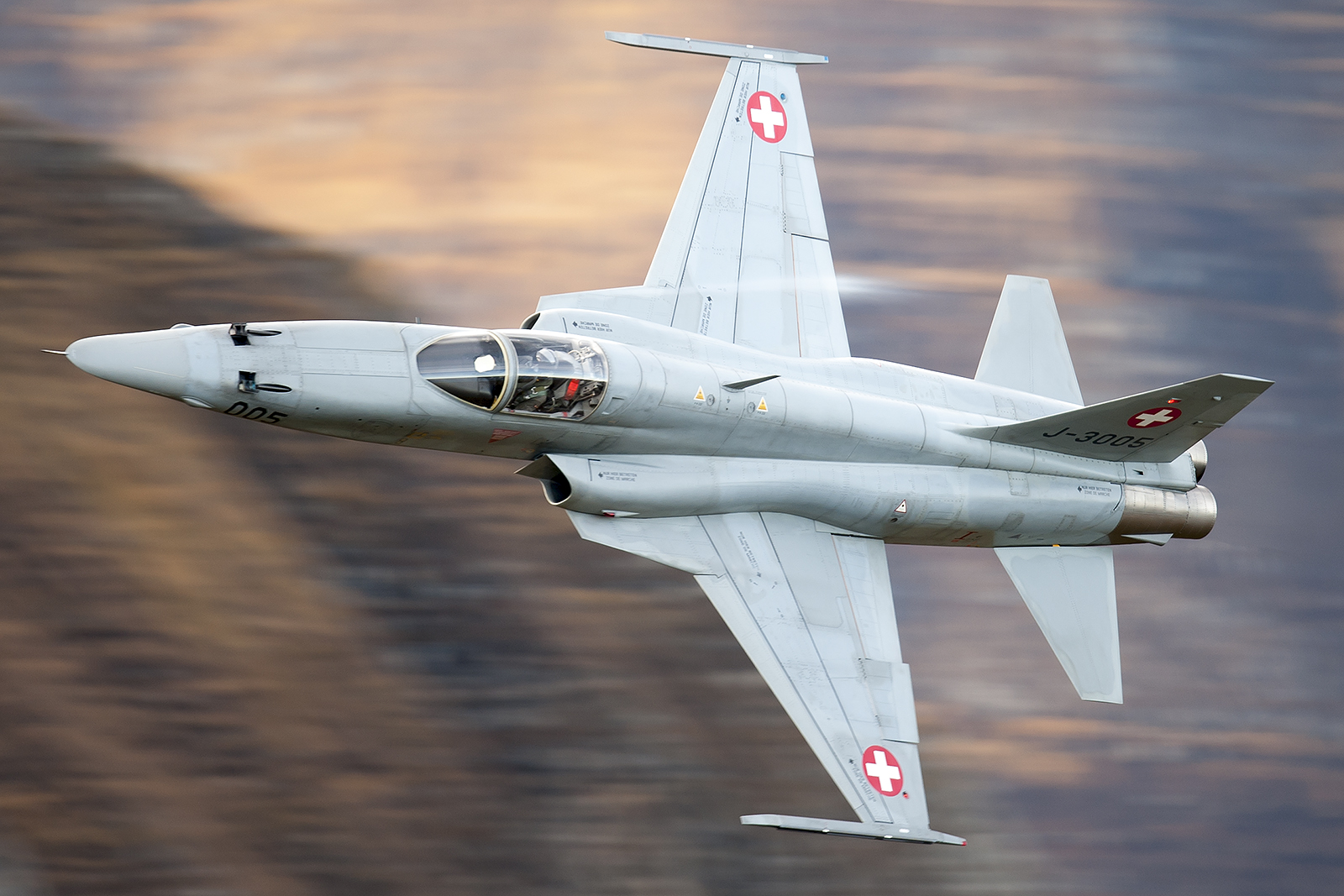
- An F-5E of the Swiss Air Force

General information
- Type: Light fighter
- National origin: United States
- Manufacturer: Northrop Corporation
- Status: In service
- Primary users: United States Navy: Republic of China Air Force (historical); Republic of Korea Air Force; Islamic Republic of Iran Air Force
- Number built: A/B/C/D: 1,204; E/F: 1,399

History
- Manufactured: 1959–1987
- Introduction date: 1964
- First flight: F-5A: 30 July 1959; F-5E: 11 August 1972
- Developed from: Northrop T-38 Talon
- Variants: Canadair CF-5; Shaped Sonic Boom Demonstration
- Developed into: Northrop YF-17; Northrop F-20 Tigershark; HESA Azarakhsh; HESA Saeqeh; HESA Kowsar

The Northrop F-5 is a family of supersonic light fighter aircraft initially designed as a privately funded project in the late 1950s by Northrop Corporation. There are two main models: the original F-5A and F-5B Freedom Fighter variants, and the extensively updated F-5E and F-5F Tiger II variants. The design team wrapped a small, highly aerodynamic fighter around two compact General Electric J85 engines, focusing on performance and a low cost of maintenance. Smaller and simpler than contemporaries such as the McDonnell Douglas F-4 Phantom II, the F-5 costs less to procure and operate, making it a popular export aircraft. Though primarily designed for a day air superiority role, the aircraft is also a capable ground-attack platform. The F-5A entered service in the early 1960s. During the Cold War, over 800 were produced through 1972 for US allies. Despite the United States Air Force (USAF) not needing a light fighter at the time, it did procure approximately 1,200 Northrop T-38 Talon trainer aircraft, which were based on Northrop's N-156 fighter design.

After winning the International Fighter Aircraft Competition, a program aimed at providing effective low-cost fighters to American allies, in 1972 Northrop introduced the second-generation F-5E Tiger II. This upgrade included more powerful engines, larger fuel capacity, greater wing area and improved leading-edge extensions for better turn rates, optional air-to-air refueling, and improved avionics, including air-to-air radar. Primarily used by American allies, it remains in US service to support training exercises. It has served in a wide array of roles, being able to perform both air and ground attack duties; the type was used extensively in the Vietnam War. A total of 1,400 Tiger IIs were built before production ended in 1987. More than 3,800 F-5s and the closely related T-38 advanced trainer aircraft were produced in Hawthorne, California. The F-5N/F variants are in service with the United States Navy and United States Marine Corps as adversary trainers. Over 400 aircraft were in service as of 2021. (Note: The 412 F-5s in service as of December 2021 made it the tenth most common active fighter and attack jet, comprising about 3% of the world's tactical jet warplanes.)

The F-5 was also developed into a dedicated reconnaissance aircraft, the RF-5 Tigereye. The F-5 also served as a starting point for a series of design studies which resulted in the Northrop YF-17 and the F/A-18 naval fighter aircraft. The Northrop F-20 Tigershark was an advanced variant to succeed the F-5E which was ultimately canceled when export customers did not emerge.

== Design and development ==
=== Origins ===
The design effort was led by Northrop vice president of engineering and aircraft designer Edgar Schmued, who previously at North American Aviation had been the chief designer of the successful North American P-51 Mustang and F-86 Sabre fighters. Schmued recruited a strong engineering team to Northrop.

In December 1953, NATO issued NBMR-1, calling for a lightweight tactical fighter capable of carrying conventional and nuclear weapons and operating from rough airfields. In late 1954, a Northrop team toured Europe and Asia to examine both the NBMR-1 and the needs of SEATO members. From this tour, Schmued gave his team the goal of reversing the trend in fighter development towards greater size and weight in order to deliver an aircraft with high performance, enhanced maneuverability, and high reliability, while still delivering a cost advantage over contemporary fighters. Recognizing that expensive jet aircraft could not viably be replaced every few years, he also demanded "engineered growth potential" allowing service longevity in excess of 10 years.

The design began to firm up in 1955 with the introduction of the General Electric J85 turbojet engine. Originally developed for McDonnell's ADM-20 Quail decoy for use on the Boeing B-52 Stratofortress, the J85 had a thrust-to-weight ratio of 6.25 to 7.5 depending on the version, giving it a notable advantage over contemporaries such as the 4.7 ratio of the J79 engine used in the F-4 Phantom.

=== Design evolution ===
Using a pair of J85s as the baseline, the team began considering a series of prospective designs. Among the earliest concepts was the N-156TX of March 1955. This mounted the engines in pods, one under each wing about mid-span. The fuselage was quite slim compared to the final design, with a crew of two under a narrow cockpit canopy.

That year, the US Navy expressed an interest in a fighter to operate from its escort carriers, which were too small to operate the Navy's existing jet fighters. Northrop responded with a radical redesign, PD-2706, which placed the engines against the fuselage in short ducts exiting in front of the tail area, like the F-4, and moved the elevator up to form a T-tail. The resulting design had a much shorter fuselage and was quite compact. Development along these lines ended when the Navy decided to withdraw the escort carriers. Northrop continued development of the N-156, both as a two-seat advanced trainer, designated as N-156T, and a single-seat fighter, designated as N-156F.

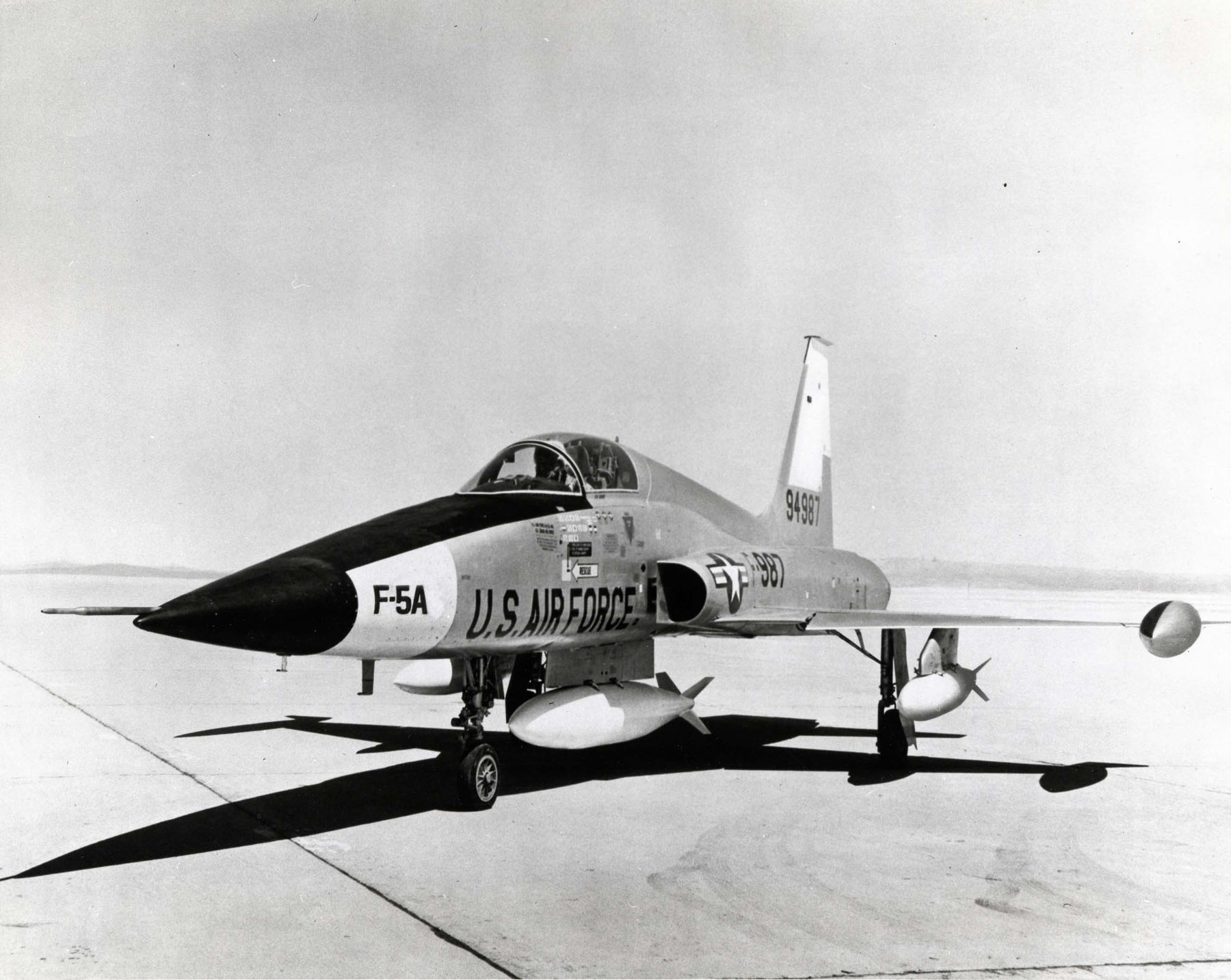
The first Northrop YF-5A prototype

Another highly influential figure was chief engineer Welko Gasich, who convinced Schmued that the engines must be located within the fuselage for maximum performance. This led to the January 1956 PD-2812 version which began to look a lot like the final product, although this version had a long-span low-mounted elevator with notable anhedral. March 1956's PD-2832 moved to a more conventional elevator and had a strongly swept vertical stabilizer. The design underwent several further versions over the next year which experimented with different nose designs and continued to lengthen the fuselage. The final design, PD-2879D, emerged in December 1956.

Gasich also introduced the concept of "life cycle cost" into fighter design, which provided the foundation for the F-5's low operating cost and long service life. A Northrop design study stated "The application of advanced technology was used to provide maximum force effectiveness at minimum cost. This became the Northrop philosophy in the development of the T-38 and F-5 lightweight trainer and fighter aircraft."

=== Into production ===
The F-5 earned a reputation for a jet that was hard to discern in the air and when one finally saw it, it was often after a missile or guns kill [by F-5] had already been called.

— —Singapore's former Chief of Air Force and F-5 pilot, Major General Ng Chee Khern.

The N-156T was quickly selected by the United States Air Force as a replacement for the T-33 in July 1956. On 10 April 1959, the first prototype aircraft, which was subsequently designated as YT-38 Talon, performed its first flight. By the time production had ended in January 1972, a total of 1,189 Talons had been produced. Development of the N-156F continued at a lower priority as a private venture by Northrop; on 25 February 1958, an order for three prototypes was issued for a prospective low-cost fighter that could be supplied under the Military Assistance Program for distribution to less-developed nations. The first N-156F flew at Edwards Air Force Base on 30 July 1959, exceeding the speed of sound on its first flight.

Although testing of the N-156F was successful, demonstrating unprecedented reliability and proving superior in the ground-attack role to the USAF's existing North American F-100 Super Sabres, official interest in the Northrop type waned, and by 1960 it looked as if the program was a failure. Interest revived in 1961 when the United States Army tested it, (along with the Douglas A-4 Skyhawk and Fiat G.91) for reconnaissance and close-support. Although all three types proved capable during army testing, operating fixed-wing combat aircraft was legally the responsibility of the Air Force, which would not agree to allow the Army to operate fixed-wing combat aircraft, a situation repeated with the C-7 Caribou.

In 1962, the Kennedy Administration revived the requirement for a low-cost export fighter, selecting the N-156F as winner of the F-X competition on 23 April 1962, subsequently becoming the "F-5A", and was ordered into production in October that year. It was named under the 1962 United States Tri-Service aircraft designation system, which included a re-set of the fighter number series. Northrop manufactured a total of 624 F-5As, including three YF-5A prototypes, before production ended in 1972. A further 200 F-5B two-seat trainer aircraft, lacking nose-mounted cannons but otherwise combat-capable, and 86 RF-5A reconnaissance aircraft, fitted with four-camera noses, were also built. In addition, Canadair built 240 first generation F-5s under license, CASA in Spain built 70 more aircraft.

The Royal Norwegian Air Force placed the first international order on 28 February 1964.

=== F-5E and F-5F Tiger II ===
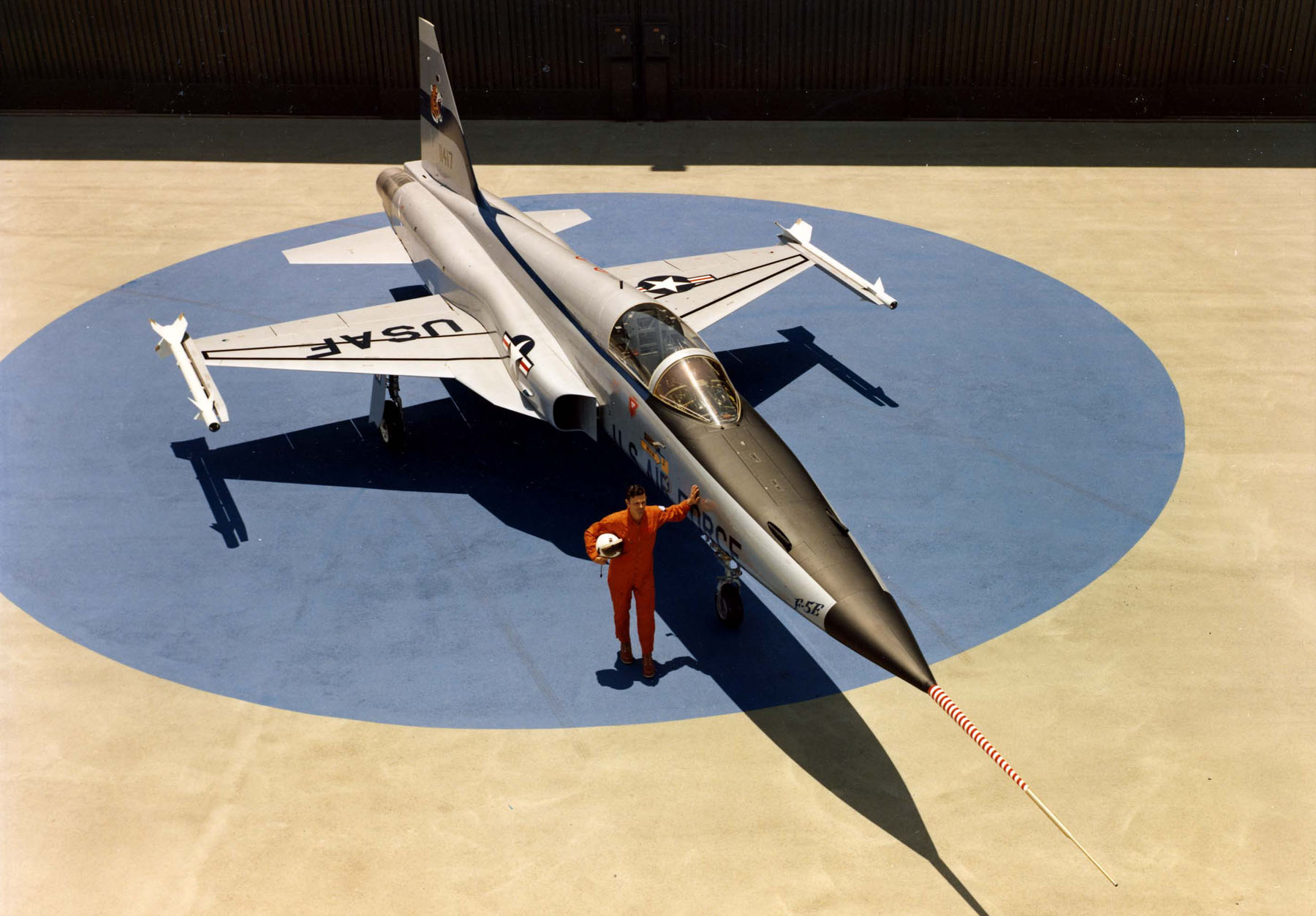
Official roll-out of first USAF F-5E Tiger II

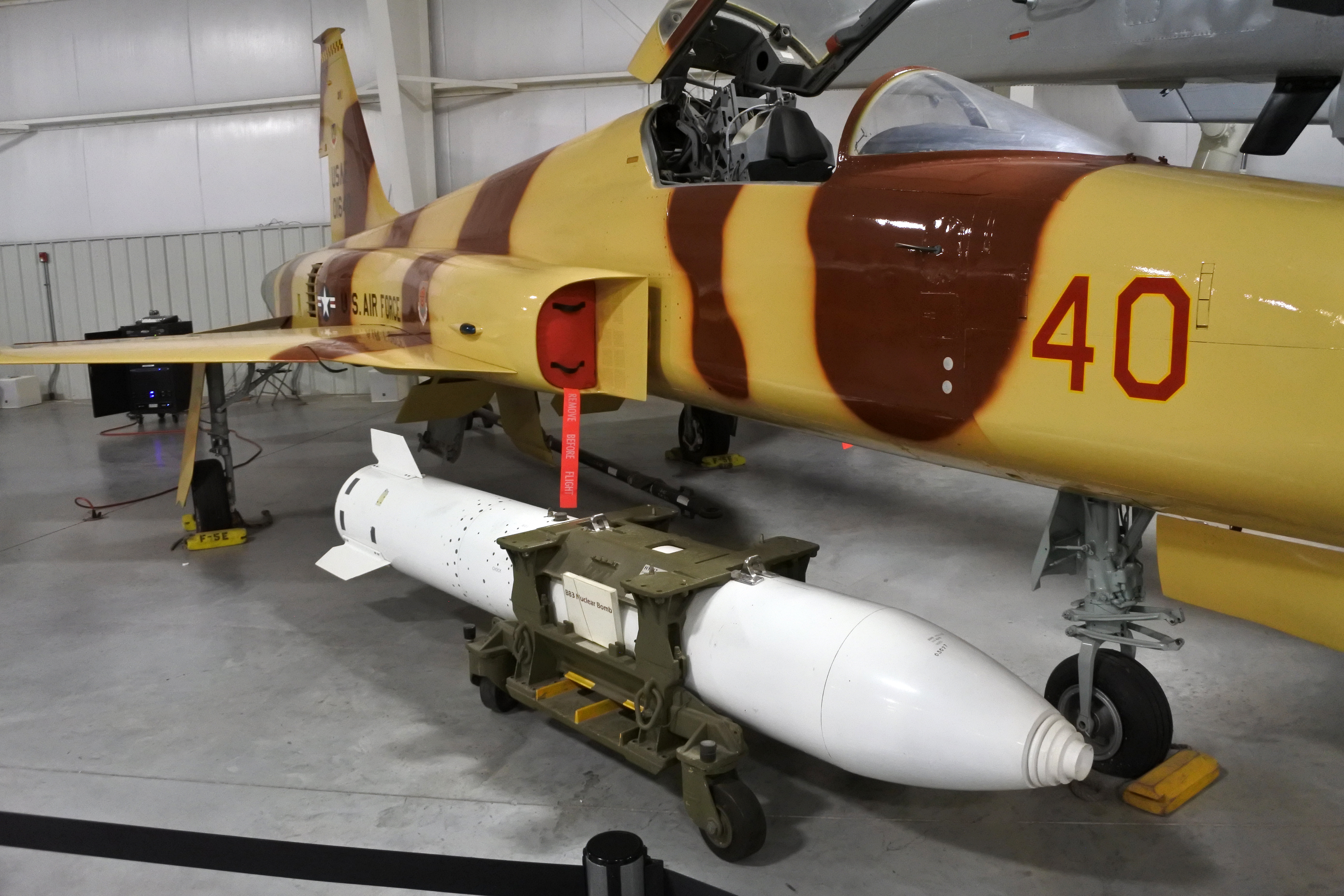
F-5E Tiger II with B83 nuclear bomb at Hill Aerospace Museum

In 1970, Northrop won the International Fighter Aircraft (IFA) competition to replace the F-5A, with better air-to-air performance against aircraft like the Soviet MiG-21. The resulting aircraft, initially known as F-5A-21, subsequently became the F-5E. It had two more powerful GE J85-21 engines, each with 3,600 lbf (16 kN) dry thrust and 5,000 lbf (22 kN) in afterburner, and had a lengthened and enlarged fuselage to accommodate more fuel. Its wings were fitted with enlarged leading edge extensions, giving an increased wing area and improved maneuverability. The aircraft's avionics were more sophisticated, crucially including a radar (initially the Emerson Electric AN/APQ-153) (F-5A and B had no radar). It retained the gun armament of two M39 cannons, one on either side of the nose of the F-5A. Various specific avionics fits could be accommodated at a customer's request, including an inertial navigation system, TACAN and ECM equipment. Additionally the two position nose landing gear from the Canadian CF-5 was incorporated to reduce takeoff distance.

The first F-5E flew on 11 August 1972. A two-seat combat-capable trainer, the F-5F, was offered, first flying on 25 September 1974, at Edwards Air Force Base, with a new nose, that was three feet longer, which, unlike the F-5B that did not mount a gun, allowed it to retain a single M39 cannon, albeit with a reduced ammunition capacity. The two-seater was equipped with the Emerson AN/APQ-157 radar, which is a derivative of the AN/APQ-153 radar, with dual control and display systems to accommodate the two-men crew, and the radar has the same range of AN/APQ-153, around 10 nmi. On 6 April 1973, the 425th TFS at Williams Air Force Base, Arizona, received the first F-5E Tiger II.

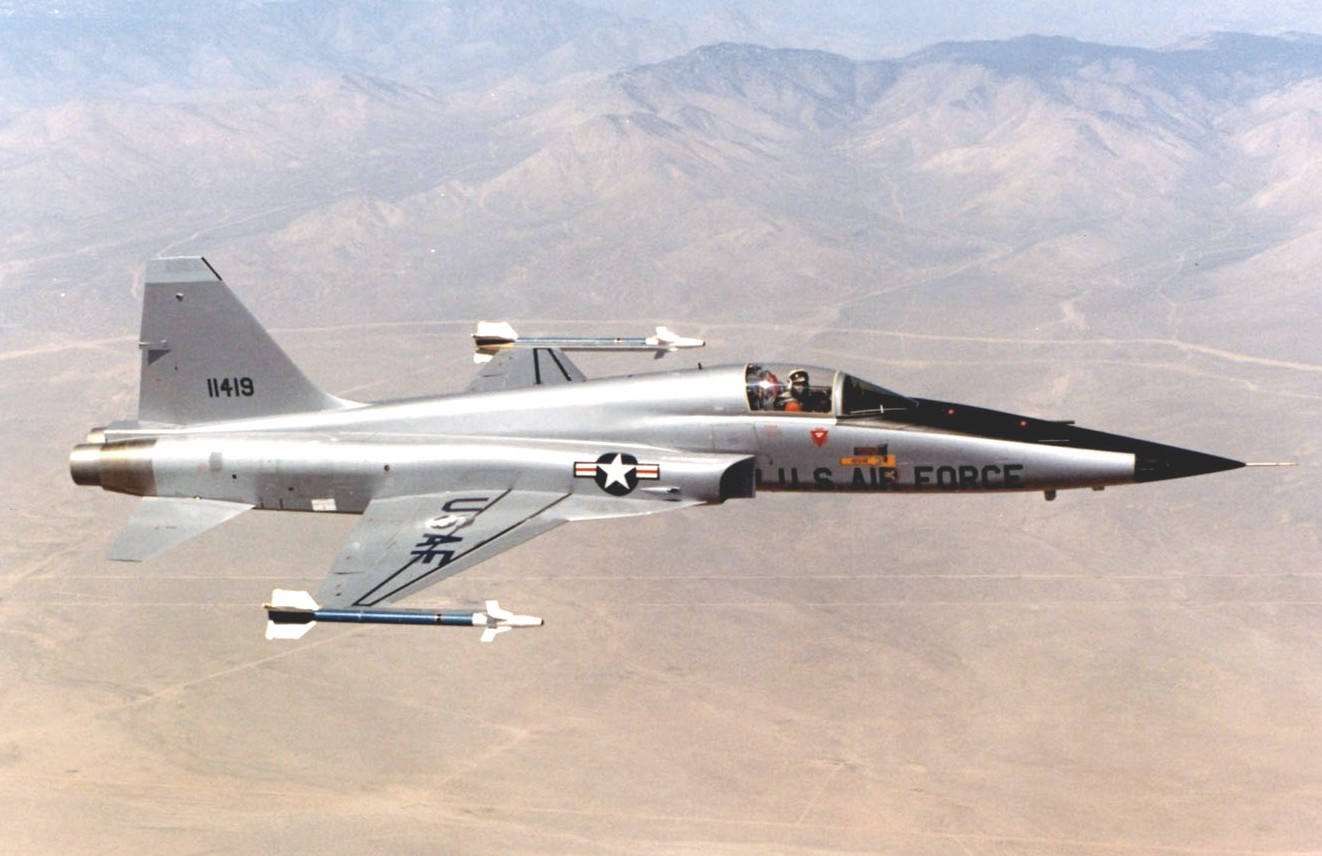
An early series F-5E

A reconnaissance version, the RF-5E Tigereye, with a sensor package in the nose displacing the radar and one cannon, was also offered.

The F-5E eventually received the official name Tiger II; 792 F-5Es, 146 F-5Fs and 12 RF-5Es were eventually built by Northrop. More were built under license overseas: 91 F-5Es and F-5Fs in Switzerland, 68 by Korean Air in South Korea, and 308 in Taiwan.

The F-5E proved to be a successful combat aircraft in service with US allies, but had no combat service with the US Air Force, though the F-5A with modifications, designated F-5C, was flown by the US in Vietnam. The F-5E evolved into the single-engine F-5G, which was rebranded the F-20 Tigershark. It lost out on export sales to the F-16 Fighting Falcon in the 1980s.

=== Upgrades ===
The F-5E experienced numerous upgrades in its service life, with the most significant one being adopting a new planar array radar, Emerson AN/APQ-159 with a range of 20 nmi to replace the original AN/APQ-153. Similar radar upgrades were also proposed for F-5F, with the derivative of AN/APQ-159, the AN/APQ-167, to replace the AN/APQ-157, but that was cancelled. The latest radar upgrade included the Emerson AN/APG-69, which was the successor of AN/APQ-159, incorporating mapping capability. However, most nations chose not to upgrade for financial reasons, and the radar saw very little service in USAF aggressor squadrons and Swiss Air Force.

Various F-5 versions remain in service with many nations. Having taken delivery of its first F-5 Tigers in 1979, Singapore operated approximately 49 modernized and re-designated F-5S (single-seat) and F-5T (two-seat) aircraft until the early 2010s when they were retired from service. Upgrades included new FIAR Grifo-F X-band radar from Galileo Avionica (similar in performance to the AN/APG-69), updated cockpits with multi-function displays, and compatibility with the AIM-120 AMRAAM and Rafael Python air-to-air missiles.

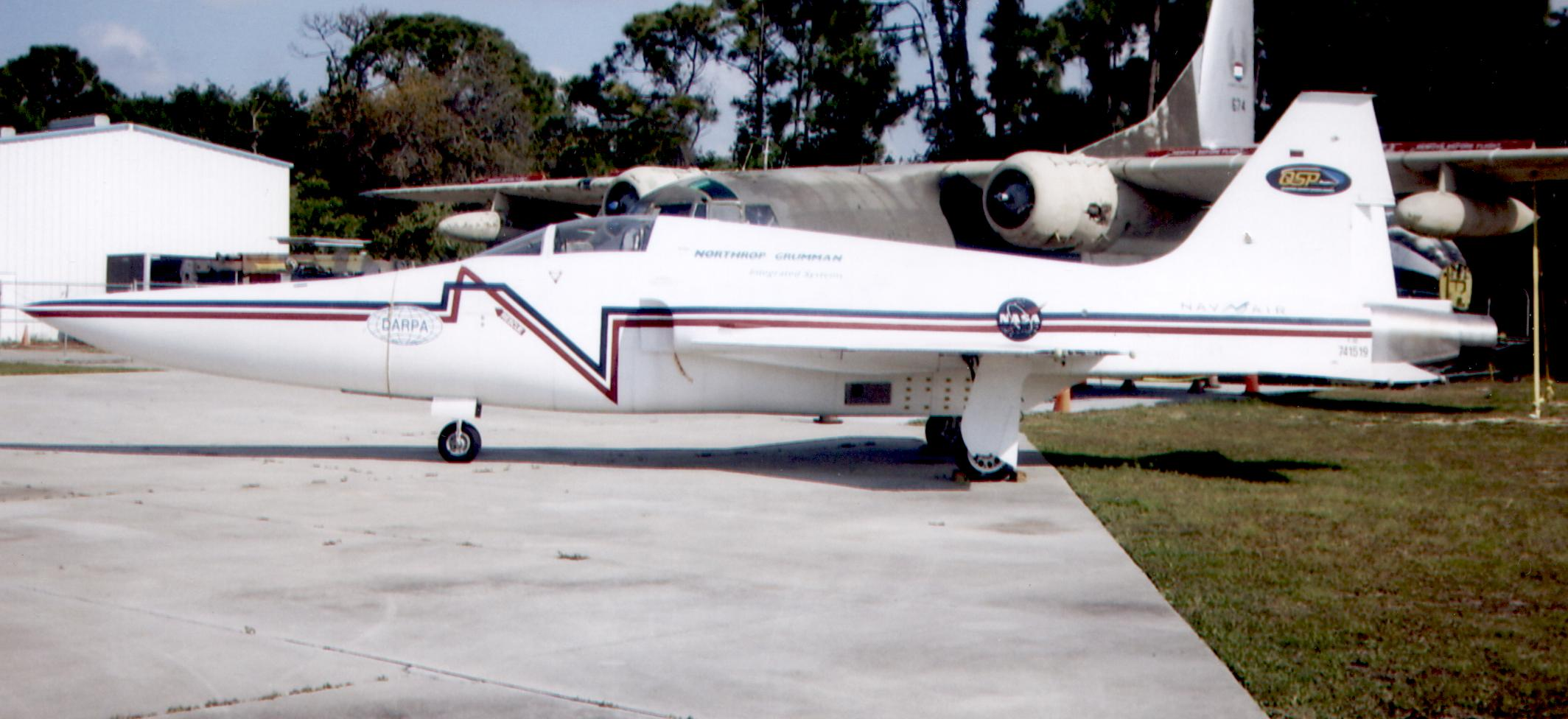
NASA F-5E modified for DARPA sonic boom tests

One National Aeronautics and Space Administration (NASA) F-5E was given a modified fuselage shape for its employment in the Shaped Sonic Boom Demonstration program carried out by Defense Advanced Research Projects Agency (DARPA). It is preserved in the Valiant Air Command Warbird Museum at Titusville, Florida.

The Royal Thai Air Force (RTAF) had their F-5s undergo an extensive upgrade program, resulting in the aircraft re-designated as F-5T Tigris. They are armed with Python III and IV missiles; and equipped with the Dash helmet-mounted cueing system.

Similar programs have been carried out in Chile and Brazil with the help of Elbit. The Chilean upgrade, called the F-5 Tiger III Plus, incorporated a new Elta EL/M-2032 radar and other improvements. The Brazilian program, re-designated as F-5M, adds a new Grifo-F radar along with several avionics and cockpit refurbishments, including the Dash helmet. The F-5M has been equipped with new weapon systems such as the Beyond Visual Range Derby missile, Python IV short-range air-to-air missile, SMKB "smart" bombs, and several other weapons.

== Operational history ==
=== United States ===
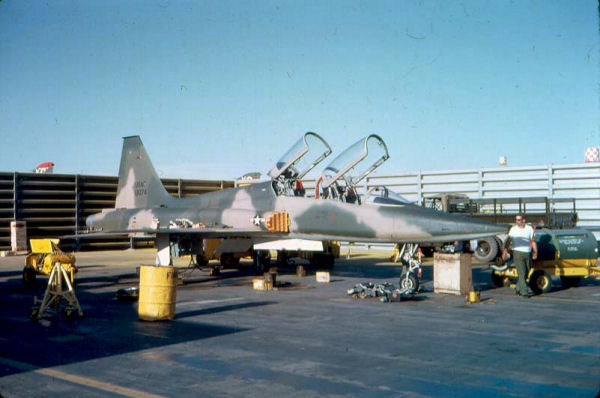
An F-5B of 602d TFS at Bien Hoa, 1966

The F-5 entered service with the USAF's 4441st Combat Crew Training Squadron at Williams Air Force Base, which had the role of training pilots and ground crew for customer nations, including Norway, on 30 April 1964. At that point, it was still not intended that the aircraft be used in significant numbers by the USAF itself.

USAF doctrine with regard to the F-5 changed following operational testing and limited deployment in 1965. Preliminary combat evaluation of the F-5A began at the Air Proving Ground Center, Eglin Air Force Base, Florida, in mid-1965 under the code name Project Sparrow Hawk. One airframe was lost in the course of the project, through pilot error, on 24 June.

In October 1965, the USAF began a five-month combat evaluation of the F-5A titled Skoshi Tiger. A total of 12 aircraft were delivered for trials to the 4503rd Tactical Fighter Squadron, and after modification with probe and drogue aerial refueling equipment, armor and improved instruments, were redesignated F-5C. Over the next six months, they flew in combat in the Vietnam War, flying more than 2,600 sorties, both from the 3rd Tactical Fighter Wing at Bien Hoa Air Base over South Vietnam and from Da Nang Air Base, where operations were flown over Laos. One aircraft was lost in combat, killing the pilot, USAF Major Joe Baggett.

Operations were declared a success, with the F-5 generally rated as being as capable a ground-attacker as the F-100, albeit having a shorter range. However, the program was more a political gesture that was intended to aid the export of F-5s than a serious consideration of the type for US service. (Following Skoshi Tiger the Philippine Air Force acquired 23 F-5A and B models in 1965. These aircraft, along with remanufactured Vought F-8 Crusaders, eventually replaced the Philippine Air Force's F-86 Sabres in the air defense and ground attack roles.)

From April 1966, the USAF aircraft continued operations under the auspices of the 10th Fighter Squadron, Commando, with their number boosted to 17 aircraft. 7300 more sorties were flown by the 10th FSC. Combining the missions flown by the 4503rd TFS and the 10th FSC; nine aircraft were lost in Vietnam, seven to enemy ground fire and two to operational causes.

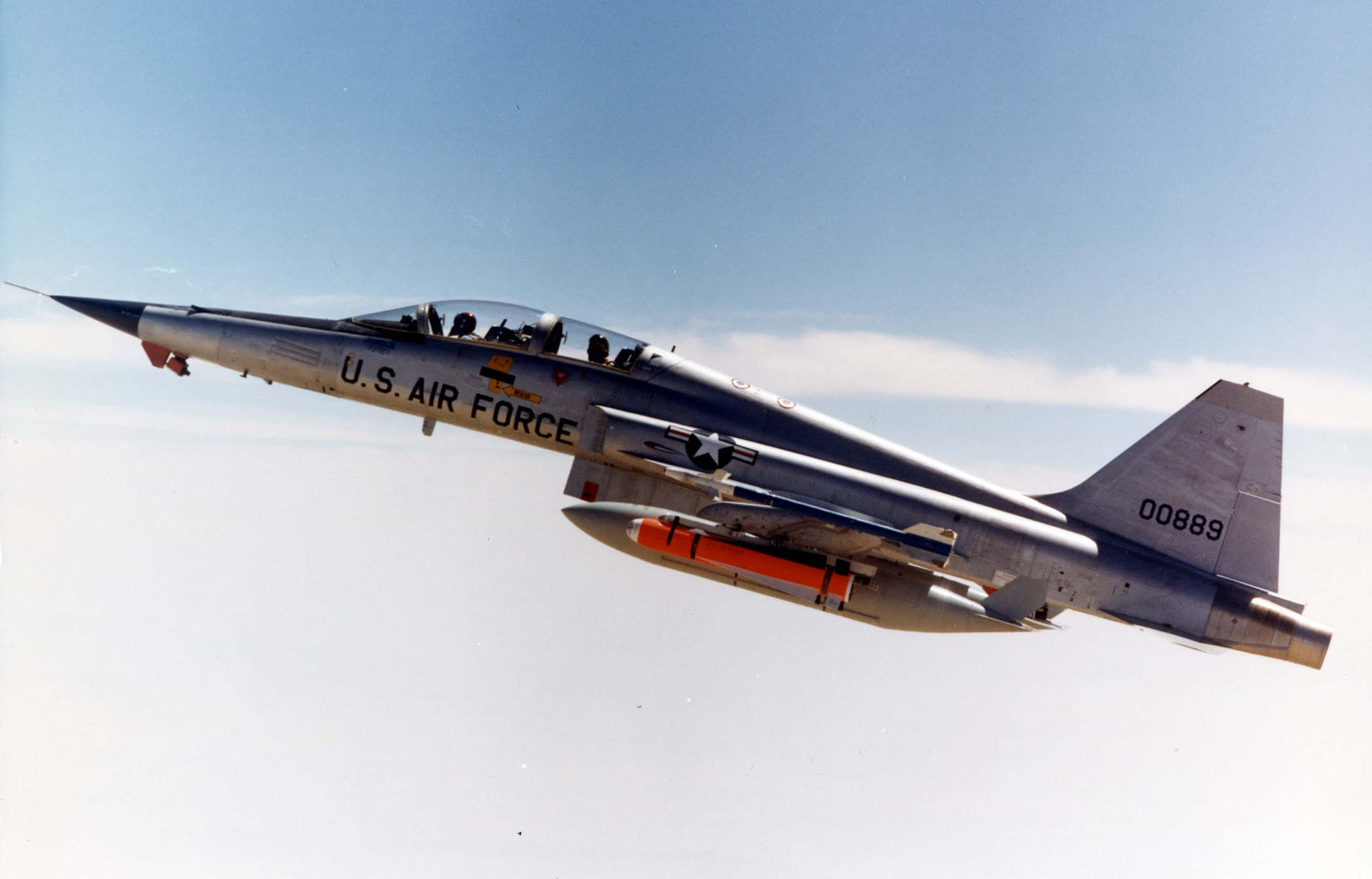
USAF F-5F with AIM-9J Sidewinder, AGM-65 Maverick missiles and auxiliary fuel tanks over Edwards Air Force Base, 1976.

In June 1967, the surviving aircraft of the 10th Fighter Squadron, Commando, were transferred to the Republic of Vietnam Air Force (RVNAF). In view of the performance, agility and size of the F-5, it might have appeared to be a good match against the similar MiG-21 in air combat; however, US doctrine was to use heavy, faster and longer-range aircraft like the Republic F-105 Thunderchief and McDonnell Douglas F-4 Phantom II over North Vietnam.

The F-5 was also adopted as an opposing forces (OPFOR) "aggressor" for dissimilar training role because of its small size and performance similarities to the Soviet MiG-21. In realistic trials at Nellis AFB in 1977, called ACEVAL/AIMVAL, the F-14 reportedly scored slightly better than a 2:1 kill ratio against the simpler F-5, while the F-15 scored slightly less. There is some contradiction of these reports, another source reports that "For the first three weeks of the test, the F-14s and F-15s were hopelessly outclassed and demoralized"; after adapting to qualities of the F-5 carrying the new all aspect AIM-9L missile and implementing rule changes to artificially favor long range radar-guided missiles, "the F-14s did slightly better than breaking even with the F-5s in non-1 v 1 engagements; the F-15s got almost 2:1". A 2012 Discovery Channel documentary Great Planes reported that in USAF exercises, F-5 aggressor aircraft were competitive enough with more modern and expensive fighters to only be at small disadvantage in Within Visual Range (WVR) combat.

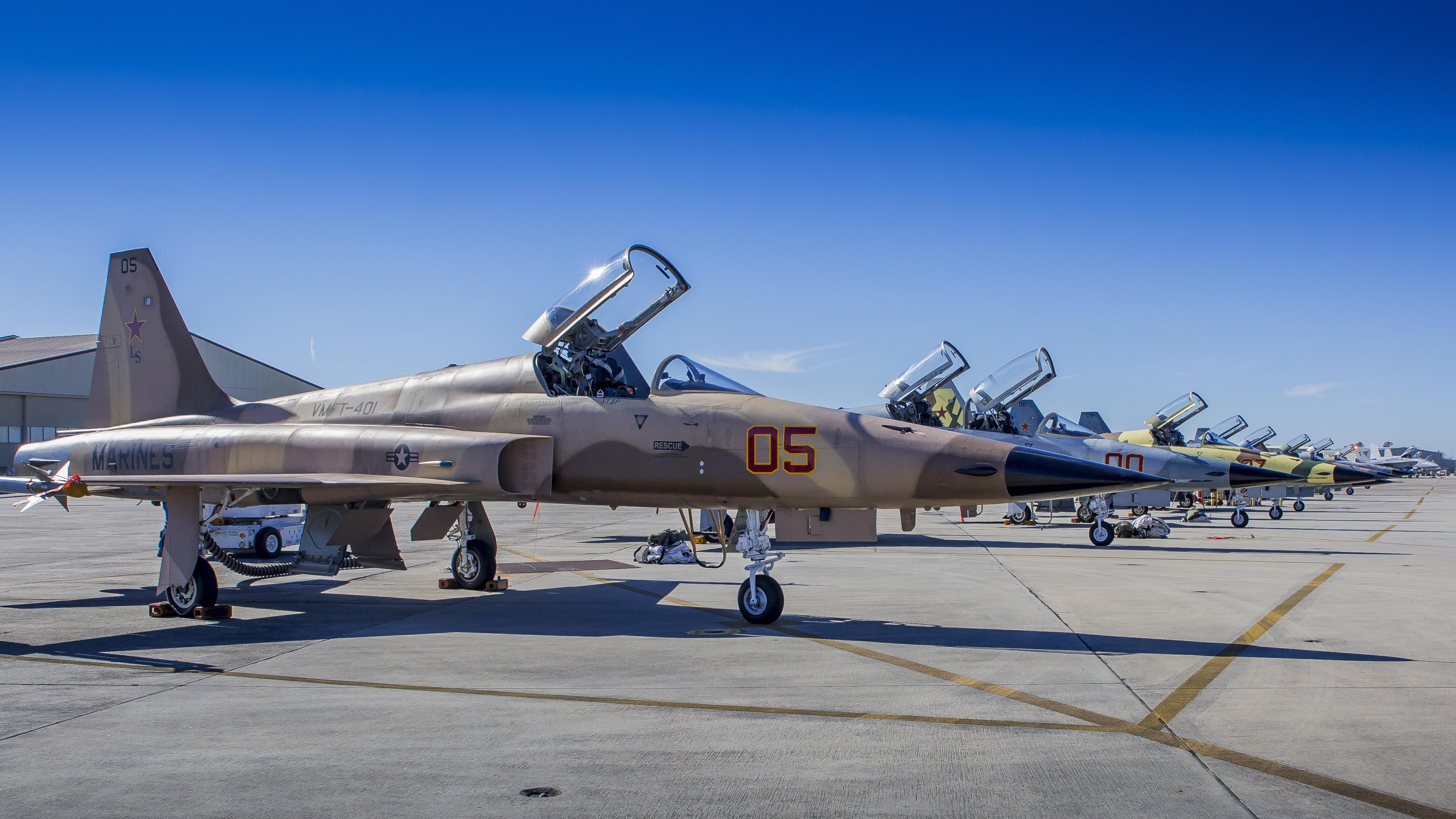
USMC F-5N Tiger IIs from VMFT-401 on standby at the Marine Corps Air Station Beaufort

The F-5E served with the US Air Force from 1975 until 1990, in the 64th Aggressor Squadron and 65th Aggressor Squadron at Nellis Air Force Base in Nevada, and with the 527th Aggressor Squadron at RAF Alconbury in the UK and the 26th Aggressor Squadron at Clark Air Force Base in the Philippines. The US Marines purchased used F-5s from the Air Force in 1989 to replace their F-21s, which served with VMFT-401 at Marine Corps Air Station Yuma. The US Navy used the F-5E extensively at the Naval Fighter Weapons School (TOPGUN) when it was located at NAS Miramar, California. When TOPGUN relocated to become part of the Naval Strike and Air Warfare Center at NAS Fallon, Nevada, the command divested itself of the F-5, choosing to rely on VC-13 (redesignated VFC-13 and which already used F-5s) to employ their F-5s as adversary aircraft. Former adversary squadrons such as VF-43 at NAS Oceana, VF-45 at NAS Key West, VF-126 at NAS Miramar, and VFA-127 at NAS Lemoore have also operated the F-5 along with other aircraft types in support of Dissimilar Air Combat Training (DACT).

The US Navy F-5 fleet continues to be modernized with 36 low-hour F-5E/Fs purchased from Switzerland in 2006. These were updated as F-5N/Fs with modernized avionics and other improved systems. Currently, VFC-111 operates 18 Northrop F-5N/F Tiger IIs. 17 of these are single-seater F-5Ns and the last is a twin-seater F-5F "FrankenTiger", the product of grafting the older front-half fuselage of an F-5F into the back-half fuselage of a newer low-hours F-5E acquired from the Swiss Air Force. A total of three "FrankenTigers" were made.

According to the FAA, there are 18 privately owned F-5s in the US, including Canadair CF-5Ds.

=== Brazil ===
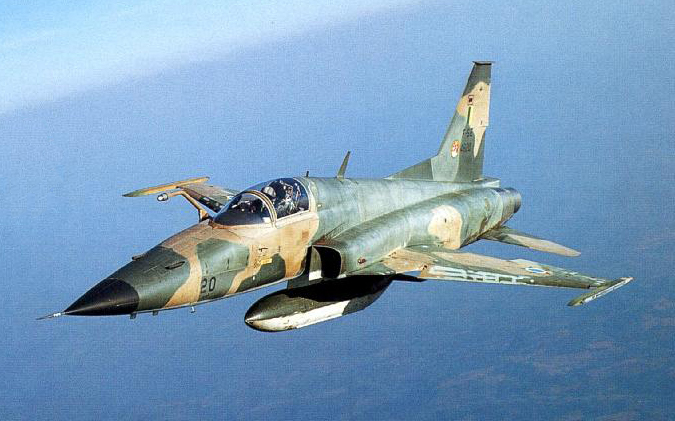
A Brazilian Air Force F-5M

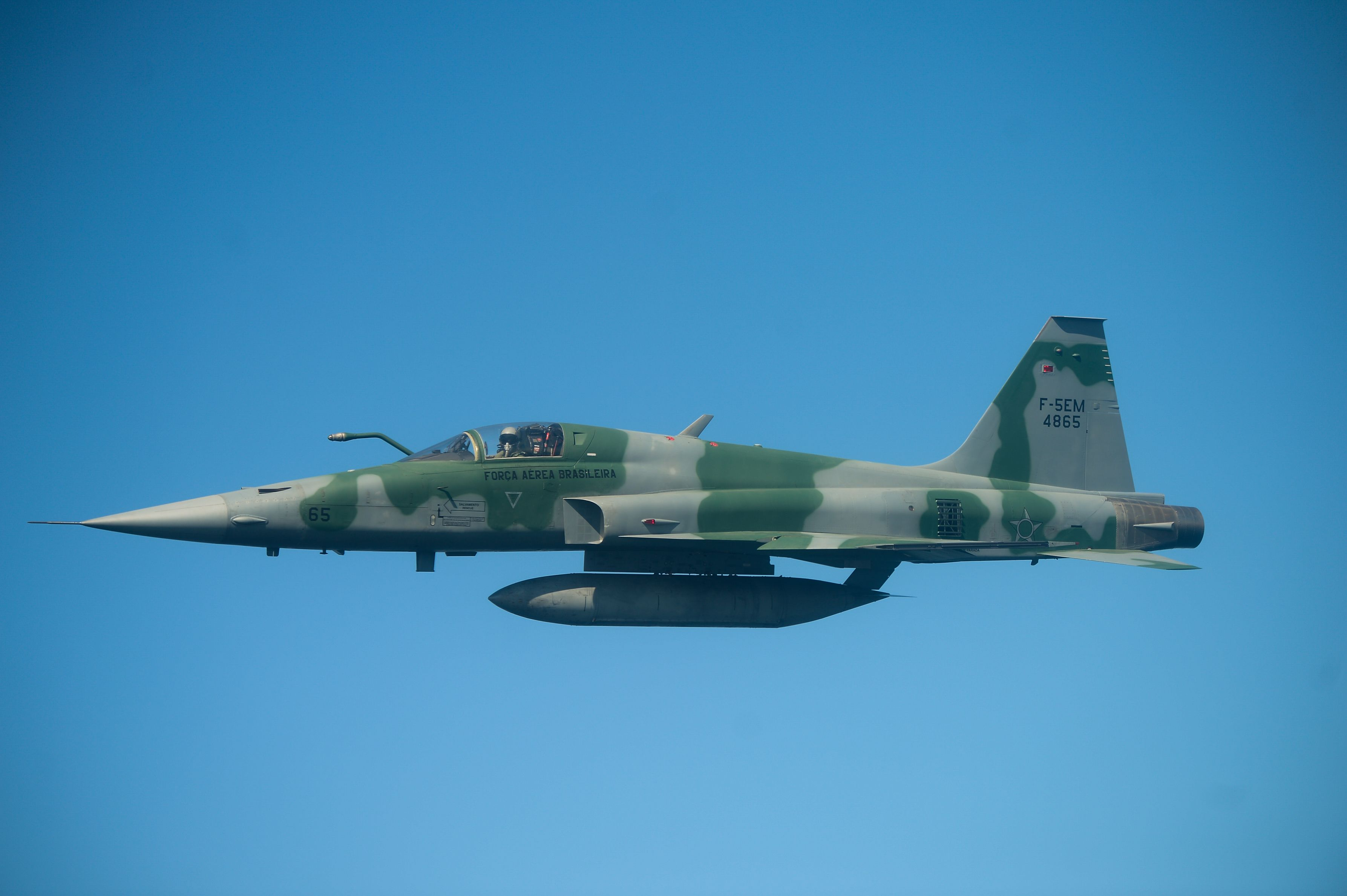
Brazilian F-5 in 2016

In October 1974, the Brazilian Air Force (FAB) ordered 36 F-5E and 6 F-5B aircraft from Northrop for $72 million. The first three aircraft arrived on 12 March 1975. In 1988, FAB acquired 22 F-5E and four F-5F second-hand USAF "aggressor" fighters. A total of 15 of these aircraft were part of the initial batch of 30 aircraft produced by Northrop. In 1990, FAB retired all remaining five F-5Bs; later, they were sent to Brazilian museums around the country.

In 2001, Elbit Systems and Embraer started work on a $230 million Brazilian F-5 modernization program, performed over an eight-year period, upgrading 46 F-5E/F aircraft, re-designated as F-5EM and F-5FM. The modernization centered on several areas: new electronic warfare systems, the Grifo F radar, an air-to-air refueling system, INS/GPS-based navigation, support for new weapons, targeting and self-defense systems, HOTAS, LCD screens, helmet-mounted displays (HMDs), Radar Warning Receiver, encrypted communications, cockpit compatibility for night vision goggles, On-Board Oxygen Generation System (OBOGS) and various new onboard computer upgrades. One important capability is the secure communication with R-99 airborne early warning platforms and ground stations.

Externally, the new aircraft features a larger nose cone that accommodates the larger radar equipment. The first F-5EM was handed over on 21 September 2005. On 7 July 2003, four Rafael Litening III targeting pods were ordered at a cost of US$13 million, to be used on F-5M together with three Rafael Sky Shield jamming pods ordered on 5 July 2006 at a cost of US$42 million.

In 2009, FAB bought eight single-seat and three twin-seat F-5F used aircraft from Jordan in a US$21 million deal. These aircraft were built between 1975 and 1980. On 14 April 2011, a contract of $153 million was signed with Embraer and Elbit to modernize the additional F-5s bought from Jordan, and to supply one more flight simulator as a continuation of the contract signed in 2000. These F-5s will receive the same configuration as those from the initial 46 F-5s currently completing the upgrade process. The first delivery of this second batch of upgraded jet fighters is scheduled for 2013 with expected use to 2030.

In 2020, the FAB started implementing the new proprietary Datalink System of the Brazilian Armed Forces on the F-5EM, for integrated communication and real-time sharing battlefield/warfare data with AEW&C R-99/E-99 FAB/Embraer aircraft, other aircraft, ships, helicopters, tanks and front/back-ends battlefield control centers, called Link-BR2.

=== Ethiopia ===
Ethiopia received 10 F-5As and two F-5Bs from the US starting in 1966. In addition to these, Ethiopia had a training squadron equipped with at least eight Lockheed T-33 Shooting Stars. In 1970, Iran transferred at least three F-5As and Bs to Ethiopia. In 1975, another agreement was reached with the US to deliver a number of military aircraft, including 14 F-5Es and three F-5Fs; later in the same year eight F-5Es were transferred while the others were embargoed and delivered to a USAF aggressor Squadron due to the changed political situation. The US also withdrew its personnel and cut diplomatic relations. Ethiopian officers contracted a number of Israelis to maintain American equipment.

The Ethiopian F-5 fighters saw combat action against Somali forces during the Ogaden War (1977–1978). The main Somali fighter aircraft was the MiG-21MF delivered in the 1970s, supported by Mikoyan-Gurevich MiG-17s delivered in the 1960s by the Soviet Union. Ethiopian F-5E aircraft were used to gain air superiority because they could use the AIM-9B air-to-air missile, while the F-5As were kept for air interdiction and airstrike. During this period Ethiopian F-5Es went on training against Ethiopian F-5As and F-86 Sabres (simulating Somali MiG-21s and MiG-17s).

On 17 July 1977, two F-5s were on combat air patrol near Harer, when four Somali MiG-21MFs were detected nearby. In the engagement, two MiG-21s were shot down while the other two had a midair collision while avoiding an AIM-9B missile. The better-trained F-5 pilots swiftly gained air superiority over the Somali Air Force, shooting down a number of aircraft, while other Somali aircraft were lost to air defense and to incidents. Records indicate that Ethiopian F-5s of the 9th Fighter Squadron "shot down 13 MiGs-17 and 12 MiGs-21 from 20th July until 1st September 1977. All aircraft were hit by Sidewinders (AIM-9)." However at least three F-5s were shot down by air defense forces during attacks against supply bases in western Somalia.

Ethiopian pilots who had flown both the F-5E and the MiG-21 considered the F-5E to be the superior fighter because of its manoeuvrability at low to medium speeds and the fact that it was far easier to fly, allowing the pilot to focus on combat rather than controlling his airplane. This effect was enhanced by the poor quality of pilot training provided by the Soviets, which provided limited flight time and focused exclusively on taking off and landing, with no practical training in air combat.

Ethiopia's ace pilot and national hero was Legesse Tefera who is credited with shooting down 6 (or 7) Somali MiGs, thus making him the most successful F-5 pilot.

=== Greece ===
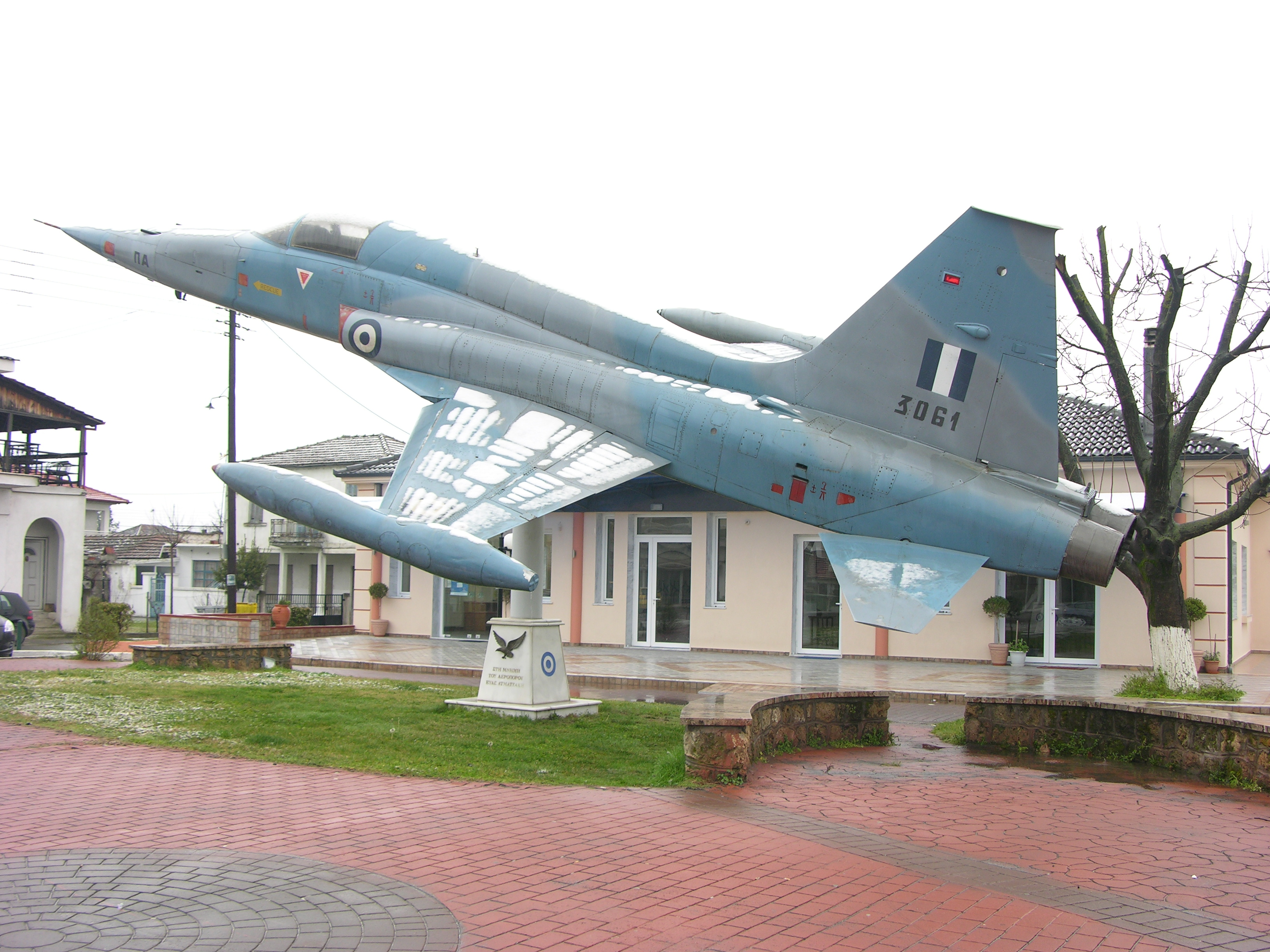
Retired Greek NF-5A on display near Edessa, Greece

The Hellenic Air Force was the first European air force to receive the Freedom Fighter. The first F-5As were delivered in 1965, and over the next 8 years a total of about 70 F-5A/Bs were operational. The Hellenic Air Force bought an additional 10 F-5A/Bs from Iran in 1975, and around the same period another batch of 10 F-5A/Bs were acquired from Jordan. Another 10 were acquired from Norway in 1986, and a final 10 NF-5As were purchased from the Netherlands in 1991. The total number of F-5s in operation (including the ex-Iranian machines, 34 RF-5As, and 20 F-5Bs) in the Hellenic Air Force was about 120 aircraft, from 1965 to 2002, when the last F-5 was decommissioned and the type went out of operation in the Hellenic Air Force.

Units that used the F-5 in Greek service:

- 337th Day Interceptor Squadron (1967–1978)
- 341st Day Interceptor Squadron (1965–1993)
- 343rd Day Interceptor Squadron (1966–2001)
- 349th Day Interceptor Squadron (1970–1997)

=== Iran ===
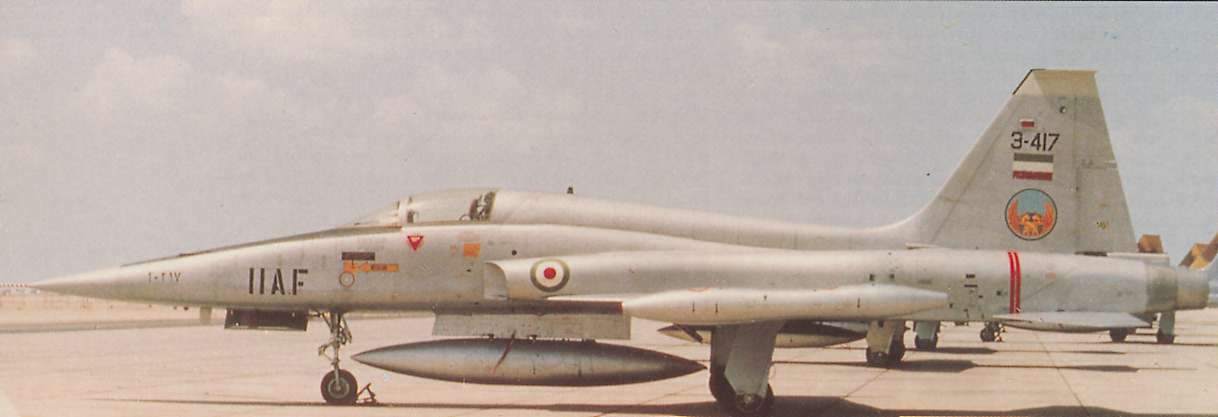
F-5A Freedom Fighters of the Imperial Iranian Air Force

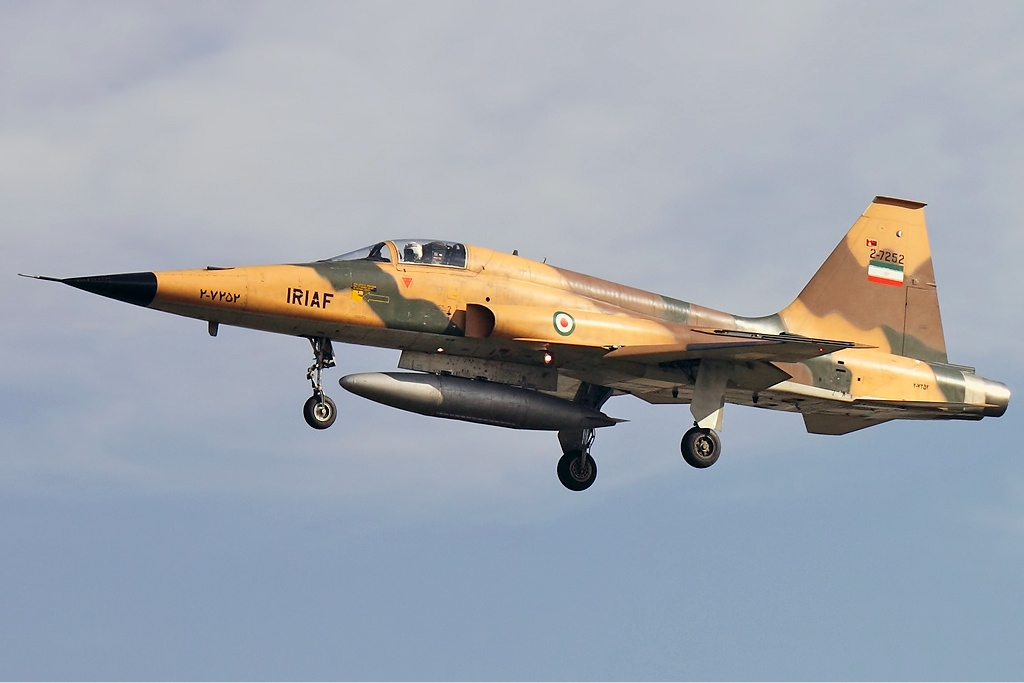
An F-5E of the Islamic Republic of Iran Air Force

The Imperial Iranian Air Force (IIAF) received extensive US equipment in the 1960s and 1970s. Iran received its first 11 F-5As and two F-5Bs in February 1965 which were then declared operational in June 1965. Ultimately, Iran received 104 F-5As and 23 F-5Bs by 1972. From January 1974 with the first squadron of 28 F-5Fs, Iran received a total of 166 F-5E/Fs and 15 additional RF-5As with deliveries ending in 1976. While receiving the F-5E and F, Iran began to sell its F-5A and B inventory to other countries, including Ethiopia, Turkey, Greece and South Vietnam; by 1976, many had been sold, except for several F-5Bs retained for training purposes. F-5s were also used by the IIAF's aerobatic display team, the Golden Crown.

After the Iranian revolution in 1979, the new Islamic Republic of Iran Air Force (IRIAF) was partially successful at keeping Western fighters in service during the Iran–Iraq War in the 1980s and the simple F-5 had a good service readiness until late in the war. Initially, Iran took spare parts from foreign sources; later it was able to have its new aircraft industry keep the aircraft flying.

IRIAF F-5s were heavily involved, flying air-to-air and air-to-ground sorties. Iranian F-5s took part in air combat with Iraqi MiG-21s, MiG-23s, MiG-25s, Su-20/22s, Mirage F1s and Super Etendards. The exact combat record is not known with many differing claims from Iraqi, Iranian, Western, and Russian sources. There are reports that an IRIAF F-5E, piloted by Major Yadollah Javadpour, shot down a MiG-25 on 6 August 1983. Russian sources state that the first confirmed kill of a MiG-25 occurred in 1985.

During their first years of service, Iranian F-5s had the advantage in missile technology, using advanced versions of the infrared homing AIM-9 Sidewinder, later lost with deliveries of new missiles and fighters to Iraq.

Iran Aircraft Manufacturing Industrial Company produces three aircraft, the Azarakhsh, Saeqeh, and Kowsar, derived from the F-5.

On 22 June 2025, Israel said that it destroyed two Iranian F-5 aircraft at Dezful Airport in an airstrike.

During the 2026 Iran war on 1 March 2026, Israeli Air Force destroyed two F-5s on the ground as they were preparing for takeoff at Tabriz Air Base. In April 2026 an Iranian F-5 bombed the U.S. base Camp Buehring in Kuwait, despite the base air defenses. This is the first time an enemy fixed-wing aircraft had struck an American military base in years, according to three U.S. officials.

=== Kenya ===
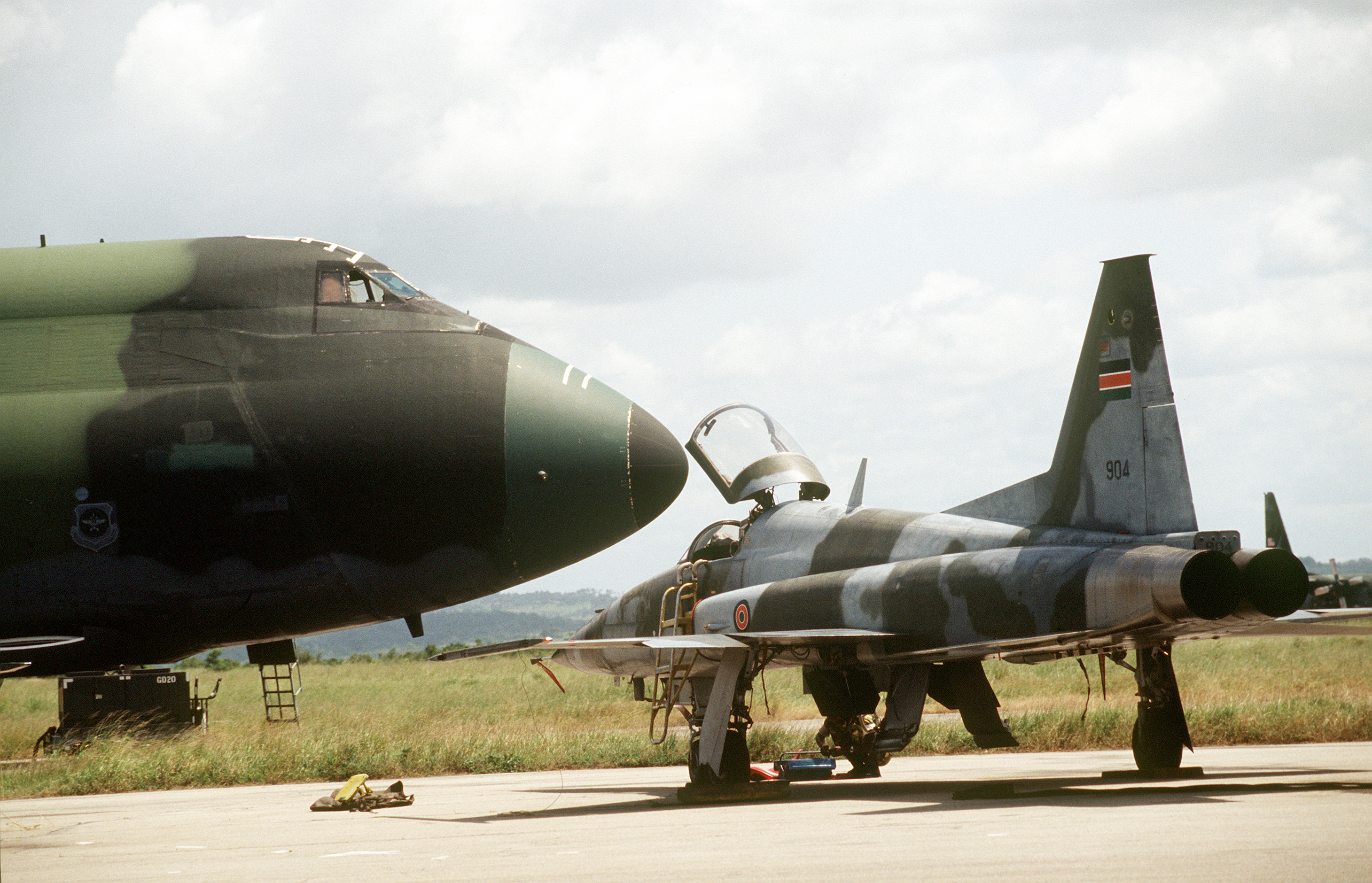
Kenya Air Force F-5E Tiger II and a USAF C-5 Galaxy in the background

In June 1976, Kenya ordered 10 new F-5E and two F-5F aircraft from the U.S. for $70 million.

Starting on 16 October 2011 during Operation Linda Nchi, Kenyan Air Force F-5s supported the Kenyan forces fighting in Somalia against Al Shabab Islamists bombing targets inside Somalia and spearheading the ground forces.

=== Malaysia ===
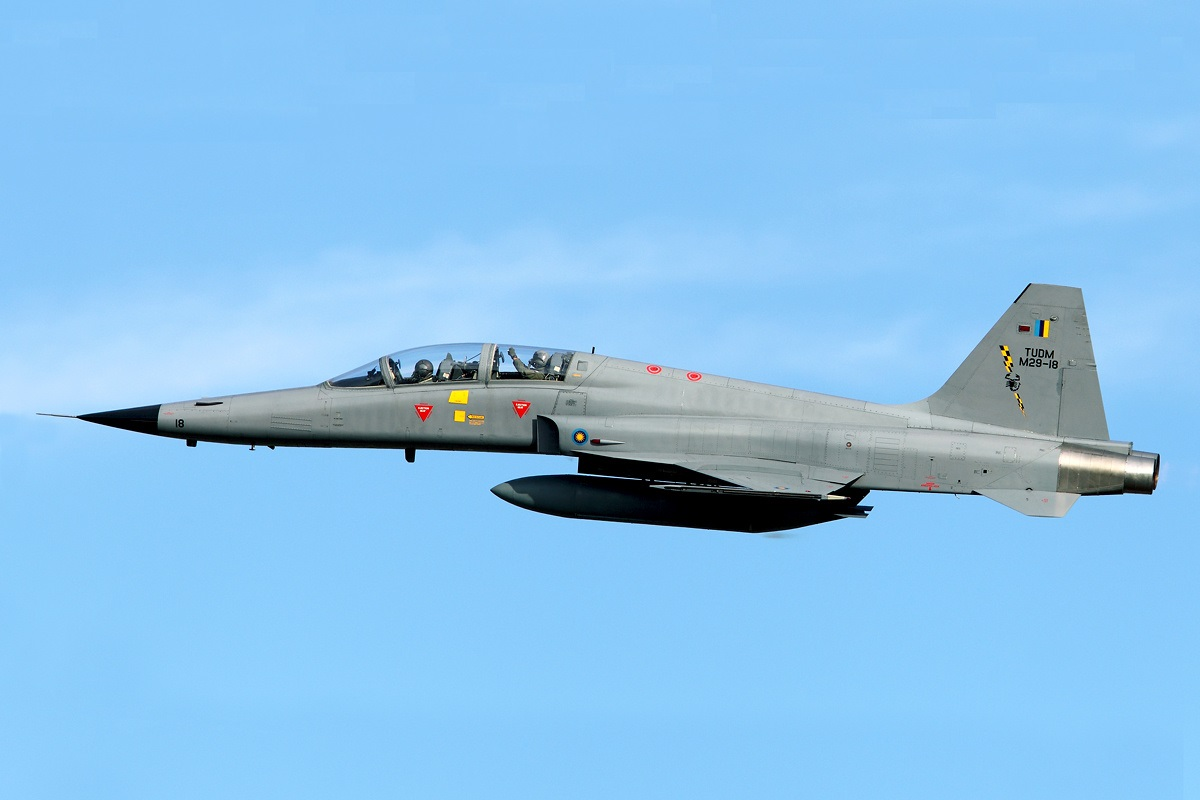
F-5 Tiger II of the Royal Malaysian Air Force

In 1975, the Royal Malaysian Air Force received 14 F-5Es and two F-5Bs. In 1982, four F-5Fs were received and the two F-5Bs already in Malaysian service were transferred to the Royal Thai Air Force. In 1983, RMAF received two RF-5E Tigereye. Subsequently, two F-5Es (M29-21 & M29-22) and a F-5F (M29-23) which came with the new "shark nose" and with leading edge root extensions (LERX) version were ordered as attrition replacement. The F-5E was the first supersonic fighter in Royal Malaysian Air Force service and it replaced the former RAAF CAC Sabre as the Royal Malaysian Air Force's primary air defense fighter throughout the 1980s and early '90s. It also served in secondary ground attack role alongside the Douglas A-4 Skyhawk. Five F-5Es and one F-5F were lost in the accident with three fatalities (2 pilots in E (1983 & 1995) and 1 in F (1986), all crashed into the sea). In 2000, all the RMAF F-5s were deactivated, but they were reactivated in 2003 as the Tactical Air Reconnaissance Squadron and Reserve. Several upgrade packages were proposed to extend the service life of the aircraft, but none were taken. In 2015, the F-5s were pulled out of service, but some were kept in storage.

=== Mexico ===
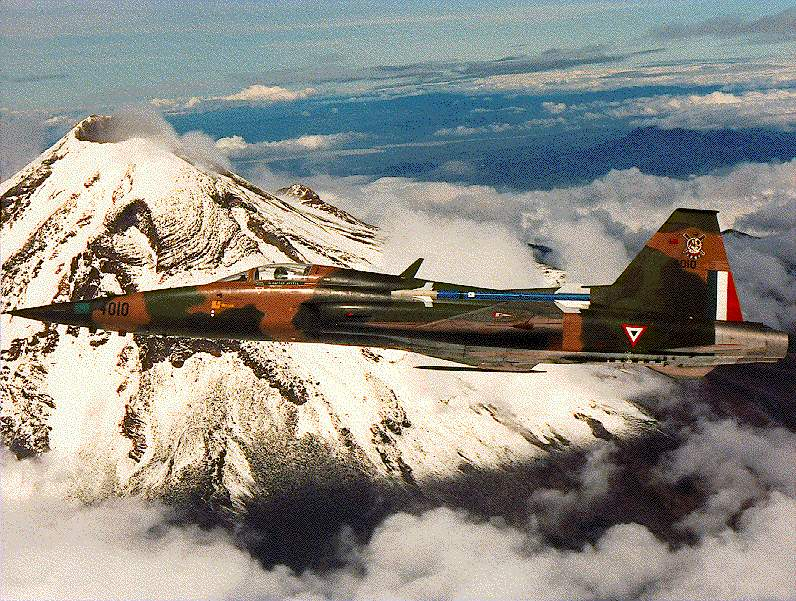
Mexican Air Force F-5 Tiger flying near the Popocatepetl volcano

In 1982, the Mexican Air Force received 10 F-5Es and two F-5Fs after the purchase of 24 IAI Kfir C.1 was blocked by the US, because the Kfir used the American-produced J79 engine. These fighters complemented the Lockheed T-33 and de Havilland Vampire Mk. I (received much earlier), two of the first combat jet aircraft in Mexico. The F-5 gave Mexico its first supersonic warplane, and it saw the formation of Air Squadron 401. On 16 September 1995, after more than 30 military parade flights without incidents, an F-5E collided in midair with three Lockheed T-33s during the military parade for the Independence of Mexico resulting in 10 deaths. As of 2021, the Mexican Air Force has five Northrop F-5E and two F-5F fighters combat ready and for training purposes.

=== Morocco ===
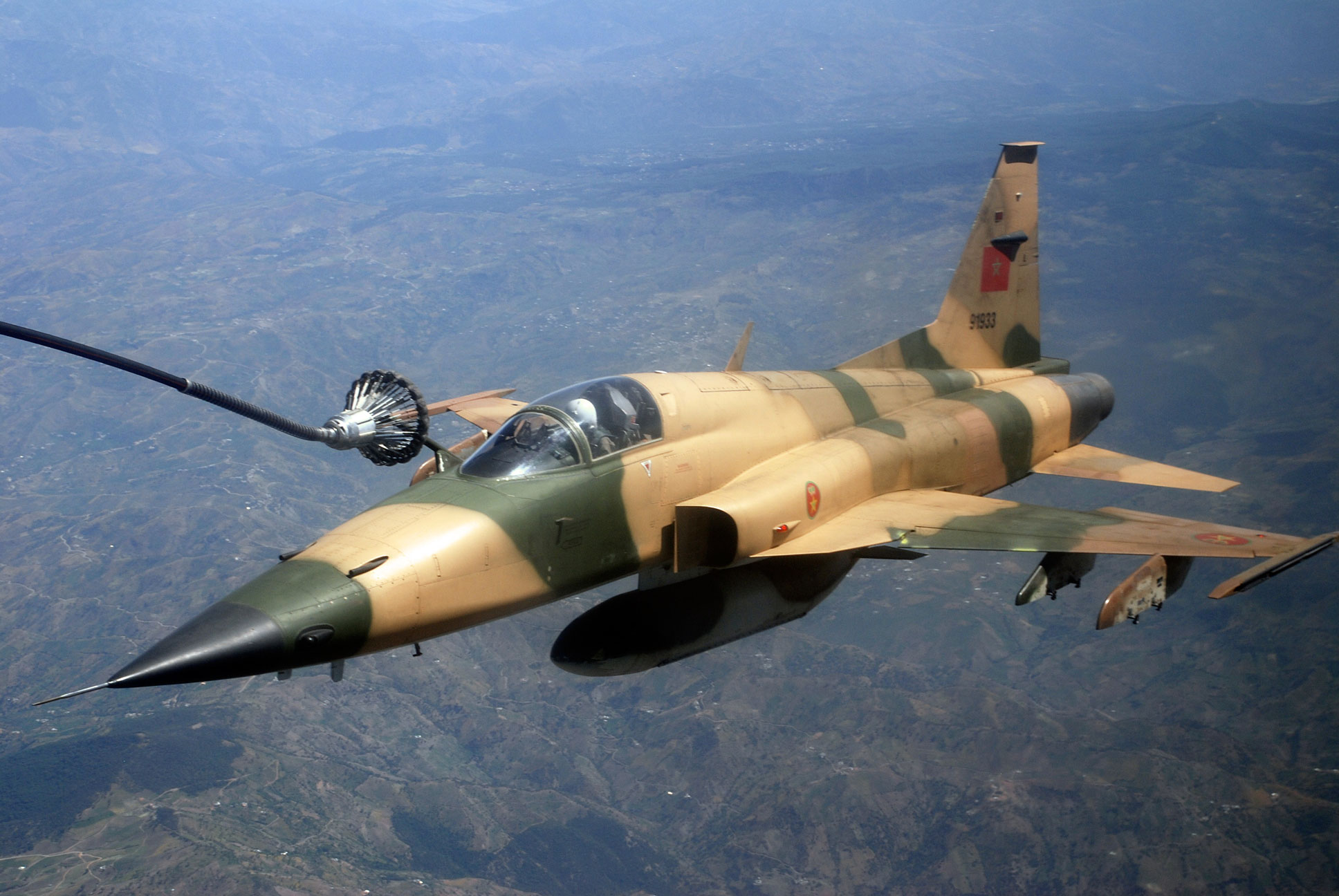
Royal Moroccan Air Force F-5E Tiger II during an aerial refueling mission in exercise African Lion 2009

The Royal Moroccan Air Force received 22 F-5As, two F-5Bs and two RF-5As from the United States between 1966 and 1974. These entered service with the 1st Fighter Squadron. Two additional F-5As were donated by Iran in 1974, and six F-5As were acquired from Jordan in 1976. Three F-5As were involved in the failed 1972 Moroccan coup attempt, attacking King Hassan II of Morocco's Boeing 727 in mid-air, before strafing and bombing a military airfield and the royal palace. After the failure of the attempted coup, nearly all F-5 pilots were arrested, and most of them disappeared. Another consequence of the failed coup was that the designation system of Moroccan air force units changed from numerical designations to names. From then on, the F-5A squadron was known as the Borak squadron.

Morocco used its F-5s in the Western Sahara War in reconnaissance and bombing missions. Several aircraft were shot down by 9K32 Strela-2 MANPADS, machine-gun fire, and 9K31 Strela-1 (SA-9) and 2K12 Kub (SA-6) self-propelled anti-aircraft systems. To counter the SA-6 threat, AN/ALR-66 radar warning receivers were installed on the RF-5As and F-5Bs around 1981. These aircraft were grouped into a newly established dedicated reconnaissance unit, the Erige squadron; one of its main tasks was to track the Polisario Front's surface-to-air missile systems.

In the same period, Morocco started receiving 16 F-5Es and four F-5Fs, that had been ordered in 1979 thanks to Saudi financing. Deliveries lasted from 1981 to 1983. Shortly after their arrival, the F-5Es were fitted with the same radar warning receivers as the RF-5As and F-5Bs; they also received in-flight refuelling probes. Lastly, Moroccan F-5Es could be equipped with electronic and infrared countermeasures pods, that enhanced their survivability against Polisario surface-to-air missiles. F-5E/Fs were operated by the Borak and Erige squadrons, where they served together with older F-5 versions, as well as the Chahine squadron. During the war in Western Sahara, Moroccan F-5s deployed general-purpose and cluster bombs, unguided rockets, and more rarely AGM-65 Maverick missiles. In total, 15 F-5s are confirmed to have been lost in the course of the Western Sahara War.

Starting in 1990, Morocco received 12 more F-5Es from the United States, a total of 24 F-5Es having been upgraded to the F-5TIII standard.

=== Netherlands ===
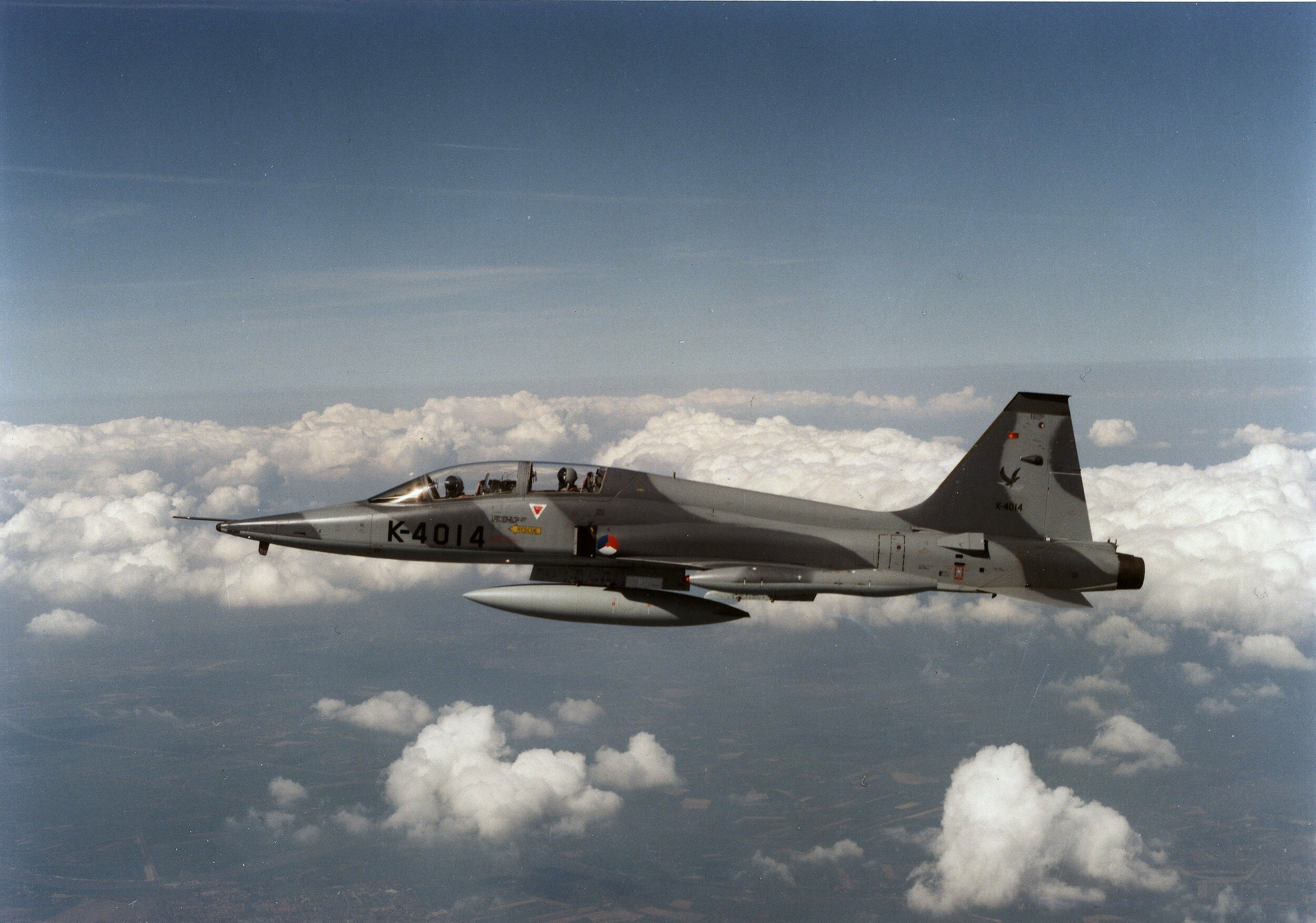
RNLAF NF-5B twin-seater

In the mid-1960s, the Royal Netherlands Air Force (RNLAF) recognized its fleet of F-84F fighter-bombers and T-33 trainers was in need of replacement. A deal was made with Canadair to produce modified versions of their license-built CF-5A single-seater and CF-5D twin-seater, which were given the designation NF-5A and NF-5B respectively. The NF-5 differed from the CF-5 mainly in having maneuvering flaps, a radar altimeter and a roller map display. Later modifications included the addition of chaff/flare dispensers and a radar warning system.

The first NF-5A was handed over in October 1969 at Twente Air Base for 313 Squadron acting as Operational Conversion Unit. The last aircraft was handed over in March 1972. The NF-5As flew under the Dutch registrations K-3001 / K-3075 and the NF-5Bs under K-4002 / K-4030. They were operational at Twenthe AB (OCU, 313 and 315 Squadrons), Eindhoven AB (314 Squadron) and Gilze-Rijen AB (316 Squadron). In total, the RNLAF would receive 75 NF-5As and 30 NF-5Bs.

During the RNLAF transition to the F-16, the NF-5s and Bs were stored at Gilze-Rijen and Woensdrecht air bases. 60 aircraft were sold to Turkey, 11 to Greece and 7 to Venezuela. Some aircraft have been written off during their operational life due to crashes and some remaining aircraft are displayed in museums or used in technical schools. The NF-5As and Bs were operational from 1971 to 1991.

=== Norway ===
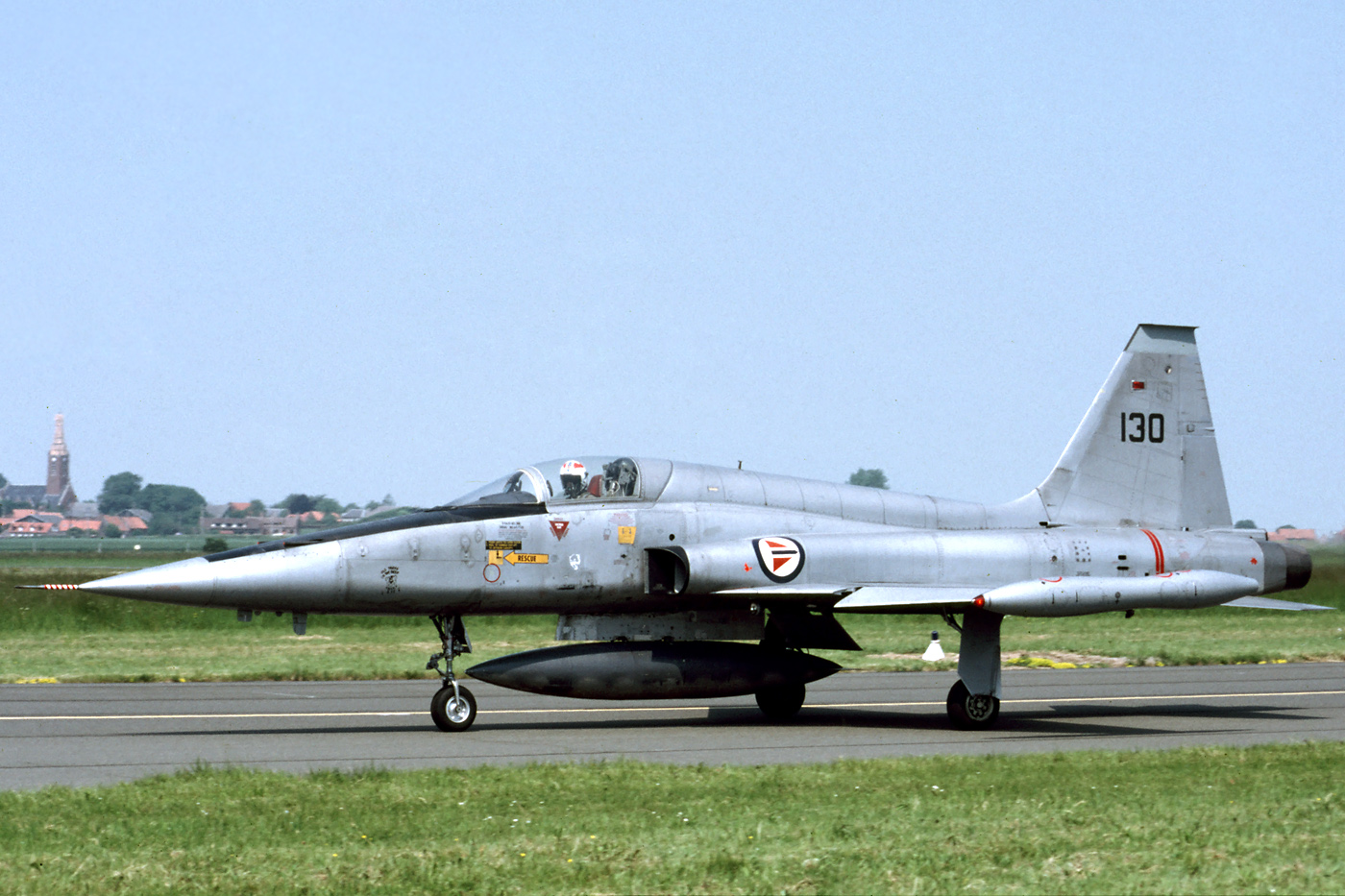
Norwegian Air Force F-5A

The Royal Norwegian Air Force received 108 Freedom Fighters: 16 RF-5A, 78 F-5A and 14 F-5B. The first 64 were received as military aid. They were used by six squadrons, the first and last being 336 Squadron receiving the first aircraft in February 1966 (formal handing-over ceremony a month later), and deactivating in August 2000. Three aircraft were kept flying until 2007, serving with Kongsberg Defence & Aerospace for tests in the "Eye of the Tiger" program, supporting development of the Norwegian Penguin anti-ship missile. The aircraft received under military aid were handed off to Greece and Turkey. Of the aircraft bought by the Norwegian government, nine were used in exchange with US authorities for submarines of the Kobben class.

In October 2011 five F-5A single seaters were given to aircraft maintenance schools around the country; including the Skedsmo, Sola, Bodø, and Bardufoss high schools, and the Royal Norwegian Air Force's training center at Kristiansand Airport, Kjevik. The aircraft were disassembled at Moss Airport, Rygge, before delivery to the schools. Of the ten remaining Norwegian F-5s, eight F-5B two-seaters were still for sale as of 2011, six of which were stored in Norway and two in the United States. The two aircraft in the United States had been approved for sale to the American businessman Ross Perot Jr., in 2008, but the deal was blocked by the US government initially. However, in 2015, Perot Jr. got permission and subsequently bought the aircraft for significantly below market price, which caused controversy and public criticism of the government of Norway. Three survivors are exhibited at the Norwegian Armed Forces Aircraft Collection, two at Norsk Luftfartsmuseum in Bodø and one at Flyhistorisk Museum, Sola, near Stavanger.

=== Philippines ===
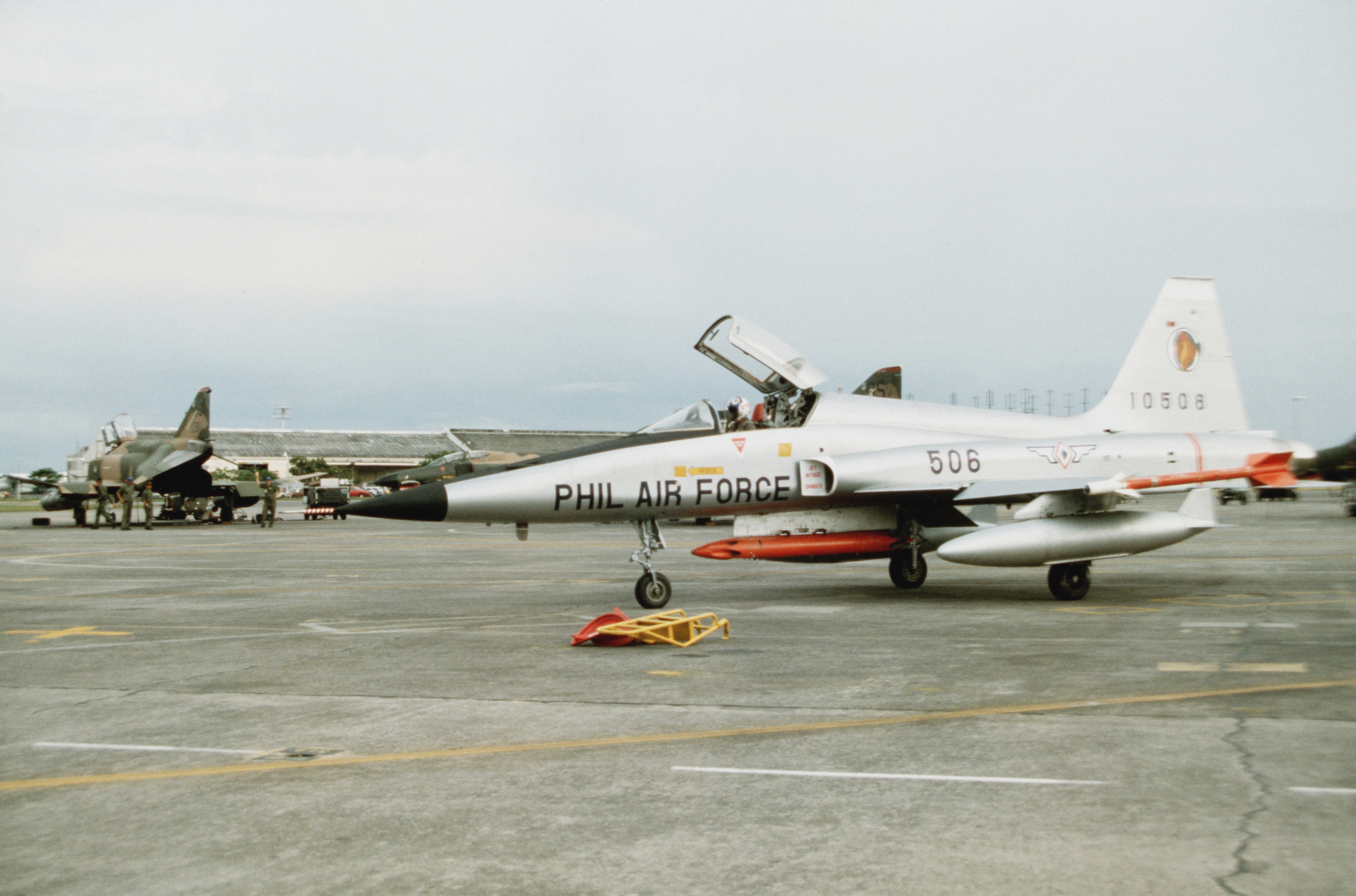
Philippine Air Force F-5A at Clark Air Base, c. 1982

The Philippine Air Force acquired 37 F-5A and F-5B from 1965 to 1998. The F-5A/Bs were used by the 6th Tactical Fighter Squadron (Cobras) of the 5th Fighter Wing and the Blue Diamonds aerobatic team, replacing the F-86F Sabre previously used by 1965 and 1968 respectively. The F-5s also underwent an upgrade which equipped it with surplus AN/APQ-153 radars with significant overhaul at the end of the 1970s to stretch their service lives another 15 years.

In 2005, the Philippines decommissioned its remaining F-5A/B fleet, including those received from Taiwan and South Korea.

=== Singapore ===
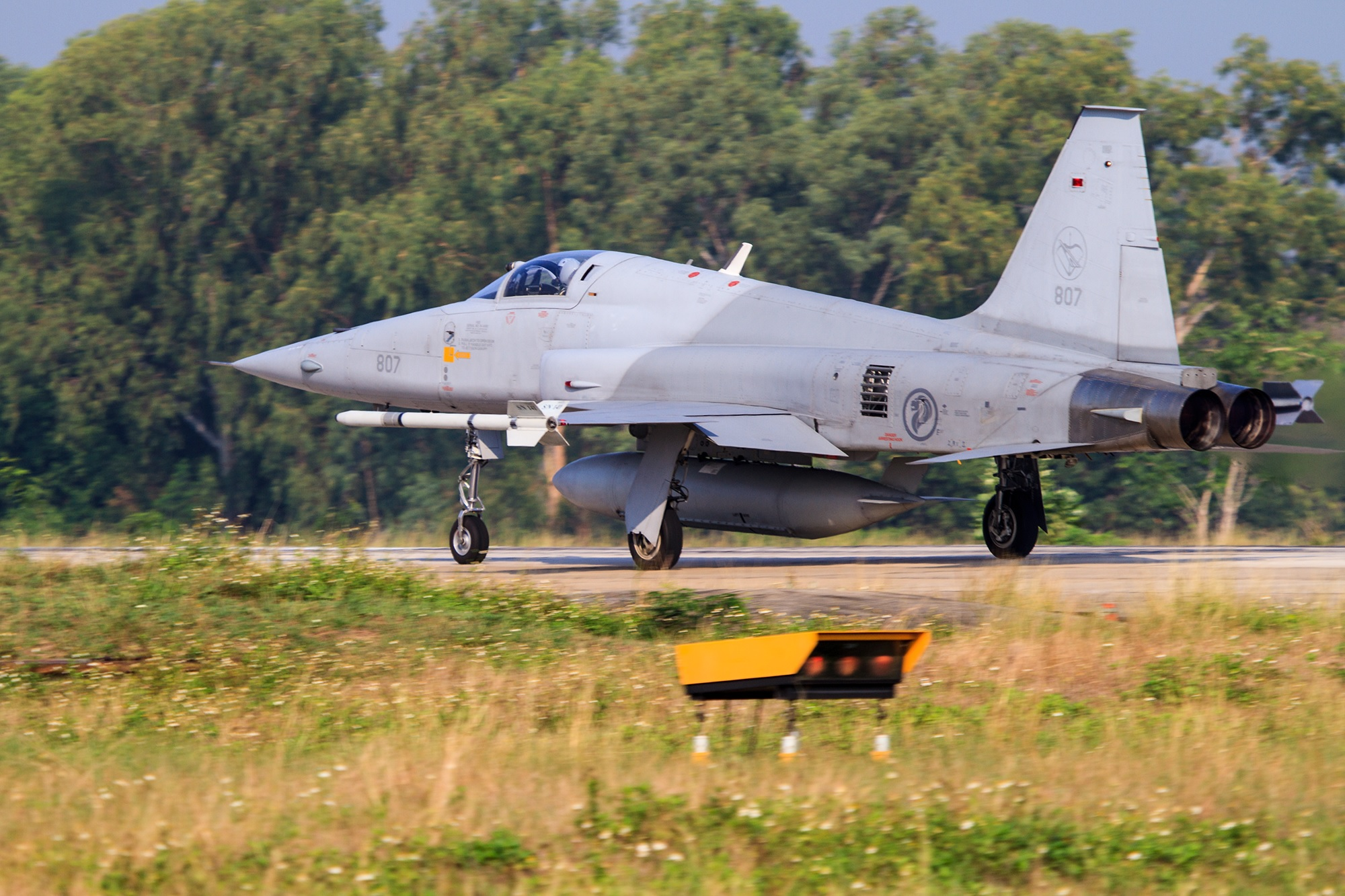
A Republic of Singapore Air Force F-5S Tiger II taking off from Korat Air Base

Singapore is an important operator of the F-5E/F variant, first ordering the aircraft in 1976 during a massive expansion of the city-state's armed forces; delivery of this first batch of 18 F-5Es and three F-5Fs was completed by late February 1979, equipping the newly formed-up No. 144 Black Kite Squadron at Tengah Air Base. At the end of 1979, an order was placed for six more F-5Es, which were delivered by 1981. In 1982, an order for three more F-5Fs was placed, these were forward delivered in September 1983 to RAF Leuchars in Scotland where they were taken over by pilots of the Republic of Singapore Air Force (RSAF). In 1983, the type took over the duties of airborne interception from the Royal Australian Air Force's Mirage IIIOs detachment (rotated between No. 3 & No. 75 Squadron RAAF) stationed at Tengah.

Another order for six more F-5Es was placed in 1985, these were delivered the same year and would go on to equip the newly formed-up No. 149 Shikra Squadron at Tengah. The following year, the RSAF placed an order for its final batch of three F-5Fs and five F-5Es, these were delivered in December 1987 and July 1989, respectively. In a bid to modernize its air force, the Royal Jordanian Air Force put up seven F-5Es for sale in 1994, these were later acquired by Singapore.

From 1990 to 1991, using jigs and toolings purchased from Northrop, Singapore Aircraft Industries (SAI, now ST Aerospace) converted eight existing F-5Es into RF-5E Tigereye variant. Subsequently, these were used to reequip No. 141 Merlin Squadron, which had traded in their older Hawker Hunter FR.74S for the newer Tigereyes in 1992 and was by then based at Paya Lebar Air Base, after the 144 Squadron had relocated there in 1986. By June 1993, all three squadrons had been relocated to the base, thus consolidating Singapore's F-5E/F operations at Paya Lebar.

In 1991, SAI was awarded a contract as the prime contractor to modernize all RSAF F-5E/Fs (including the 7 ex-Jordanian F-5Es); Elbit Systems was the sub-contractor responsible for systems integration. Upgrades include a new X band multi-mode radar (the Italian FIAR Grifo-F, with Beyond-visual-range missile and Look-down/shoot-down capabilities), a revamped cockpit with new MIL-STD-1553R databuses, GEC/Ferranti 4510 Head-up display/weapons delivery system, two BAE Systems MED-2067 Multi-function displays, Litton LN-93 INS (similar to the ST Aerospace A-4SU Super Skyhawk) and Hands On Throttle-And-Stick controls (HOTAS) to reduce pilot workload. Reportedly, the Elisra SPS2000 radar warning receiver and countermeasure system was also installed.

In addition, the starboard M39 20 mm cannon mounted in the nose was removed to make way for additional avionics (the sole cannon on the two-seaters was removed because of this), and to improve maneuverability, upgraded aircraft received larger leading edge root extensions (LERX). The process began in March 1996 and was completed by 2001, receiving the new designation of F-5S/T. In 1998, the eight RF-5Es also received the upgrades (except for the radar) and were redesignated as RF-5S. Each F-5S/T upgraded reportedly cost SGD$6 million.

By end of 2009, the type had accumulated more than 170,000 hours of flight time in Singapore service with only two F-5Es being lost in separate accidents (in 1984 and 1991, respectively). 144 Squadron, the last squadron operating F-5Es, disbanded in September 2015 after the F-5S was retired.

=== South Korea ===
The Republic of Korea Air Force (ROKAF) purchased F-5A/Bs in 1965, and it purchased F-5Es in August 1974. KF-5 variants were built by Korean Air under license between 1982 and 1986.

The F-5E/Fs and KF-5E/Fs were to be replaced by FA-50s and after 2001, by the plans to eventually field the Korean F-X Phase 3.

=== Spain ===
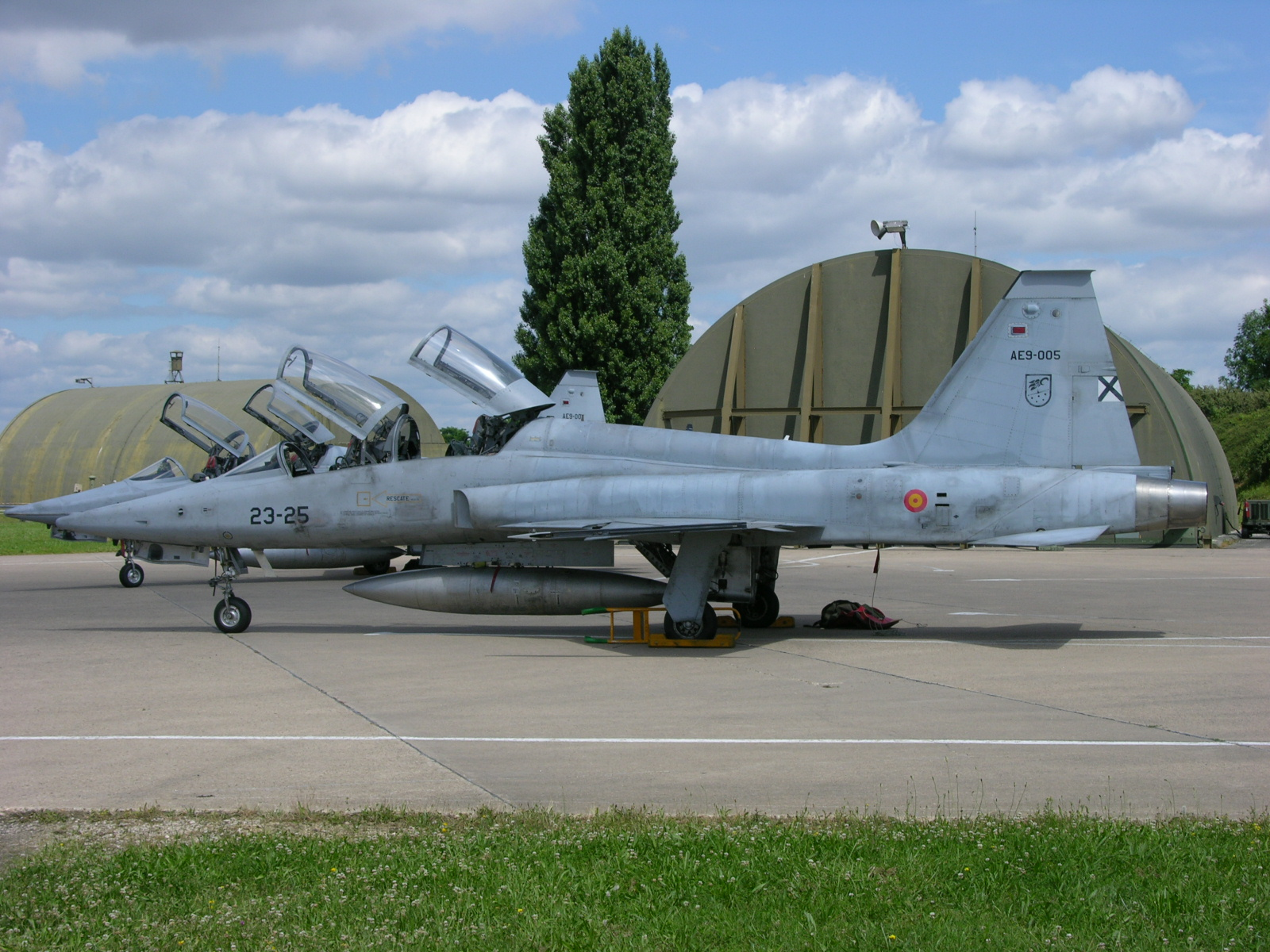
Spanish Air Force F-5M Freedom Fighters, 2008

On 11 January 1965, Spain announced the choice of the F-5 to replace their T-33 and F-86 aircraft. During the evaluation phase, an F-5B crashed near Torrejón Air Base, killing both occupants, a Northrop pilot and a pilot from the Ejército del Aire. The contract included 70 units, 8 of which being manufactured by Northrop, 2 disassembled and assembled in Spain, and the remaining 6 in the form of components and structures ready construction. The remaining 62 would be built under license by CASA in the factory at Getafe. The first of this Spanish built batch would take off on 22 May 1968 from the Getafe Air Base flown by a Northrop test pilot. The first delivery to the Ejército del Aire was on 19 June 1969, being 2 F-5B for the 202 Escuadrón, based at Morón de la Frontera. The first delivery consisted of all F-5Bs, with the single-seat F-5A and RF-5A aircraft delivered at a later date. The last of the 70 airframes was received on 11 April 1972.

The F-5B was assigned to the Ala 73 at Talavera la Real Air Base, dedicated to training. In addition to the aforementioned Escuadrón 202, the Escuadrón 204 received RF-5A airframes. This unit would later become the Ala 21 in 1971.

With the increasing tension with Morocco during the later phase of the Francoist government, the Spanish CASA/Northrop F-5A saw action during the conflict in the Spanish Sahara, being deployed at the Gando Air Base, flying upwards of 500 combat missions. This deployment became permanent from 1974 onwards, being formalized in 1976. Two F-5B and all F-5A with even registration were ascribed to Ala 46 in the Escuadrón 464 at the Gando Air Base, until their replacement in 1982 by the newly acquired Dassault-Breguet F1EE, with the F-5s being sent back to Morón de la Frontera.

In 1989, an F-5B crashed due to a structural failure of a wing. The entire F-5 fleet was grounded while crews conducted searches for signs of material fatigue, and as a result of this, many F-5s were retired. The remaining single-seaters (F-5A and RF-5A) were transferred in 1995 to the Ala 23 in Talavera la Real, together with some of the retired airframes, which were used for spare parts.

As a result of the 1990 accident, all twin-seat aircraft were sent to the CASA Getafe Factory to be maintained and renovated. A new modernisation program began in 2008 to extend their operational life until 2025, and also add glass cockpits and zero-zero ejection seats.

As of the early 2020s, Spain has a fleet of about 20 F-5s that are planned to operate until at least 2028, as no replacement has yet been found. It is estimated that, with proper maintenance, these aircraft have several years of service left.

=== Switzerland ===
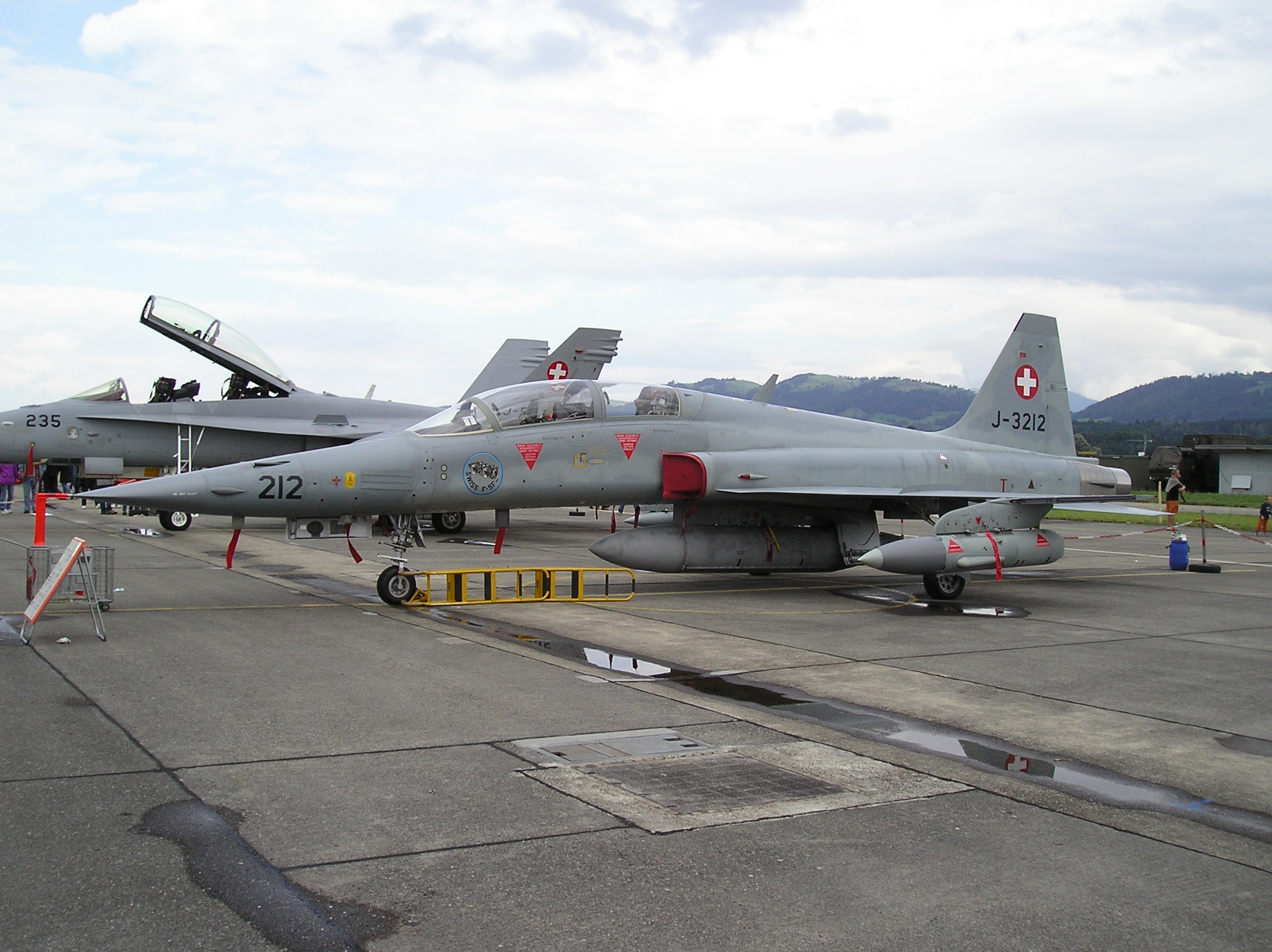
Swiss F-5F with Ericson Vista 5 radar jammer

The Swiss Air Force flies a total of 22 F-5E and 4 F-5F aircraft, down from a peak of 98 and 12 in 1981. They were chosen chiefly because of their performance, suitability for the unique Swiss Air Force mission, and their relatively low maintenance cost per flight hour.

It had been expected these aircraft would be replaced by the Saab JAS 39 Gripen, but in May 2014, a referendum by the Swiss people decided against the purchase of the Gripens.

For the foreseeable future, the Swiss Air Force will continue to fly its present F-5s. There are still plans by the Swiss Air Force and in the Swiss parliament to fly 18 F-5E and four F-5F models. This would also include the continued operation of the Patrouille Suisse, in F-5Es until 2018.

In September 2020 the Swiss people voted yes in a referendum to get a replacement. With 50.1% to 49.9% and only 8670 votes between.

The Swiss Air Force has decided to replace the aircraft with 36 F-35As.

In March 2024, The Swiss Federal Office for Armaments started delivery of 22 decommissioned F-5E/F Tiger II fighter jets to the United States. The first aircraft was picked up by the United States Marine Corps on 18 March from Emmen Air Force Station aboard a Lockheed KC-130J transport aircraft. The sale, finalized in 2020, encompasses 16 single-seat F-5E and 6 twin-seat F-5F variants, along with associated ground equipment, spare parts, and logistical support for in-country storage and preparation for transport to the U.S. The total value of the sale is estimated at $32.4 million.

=== Taiwan ===
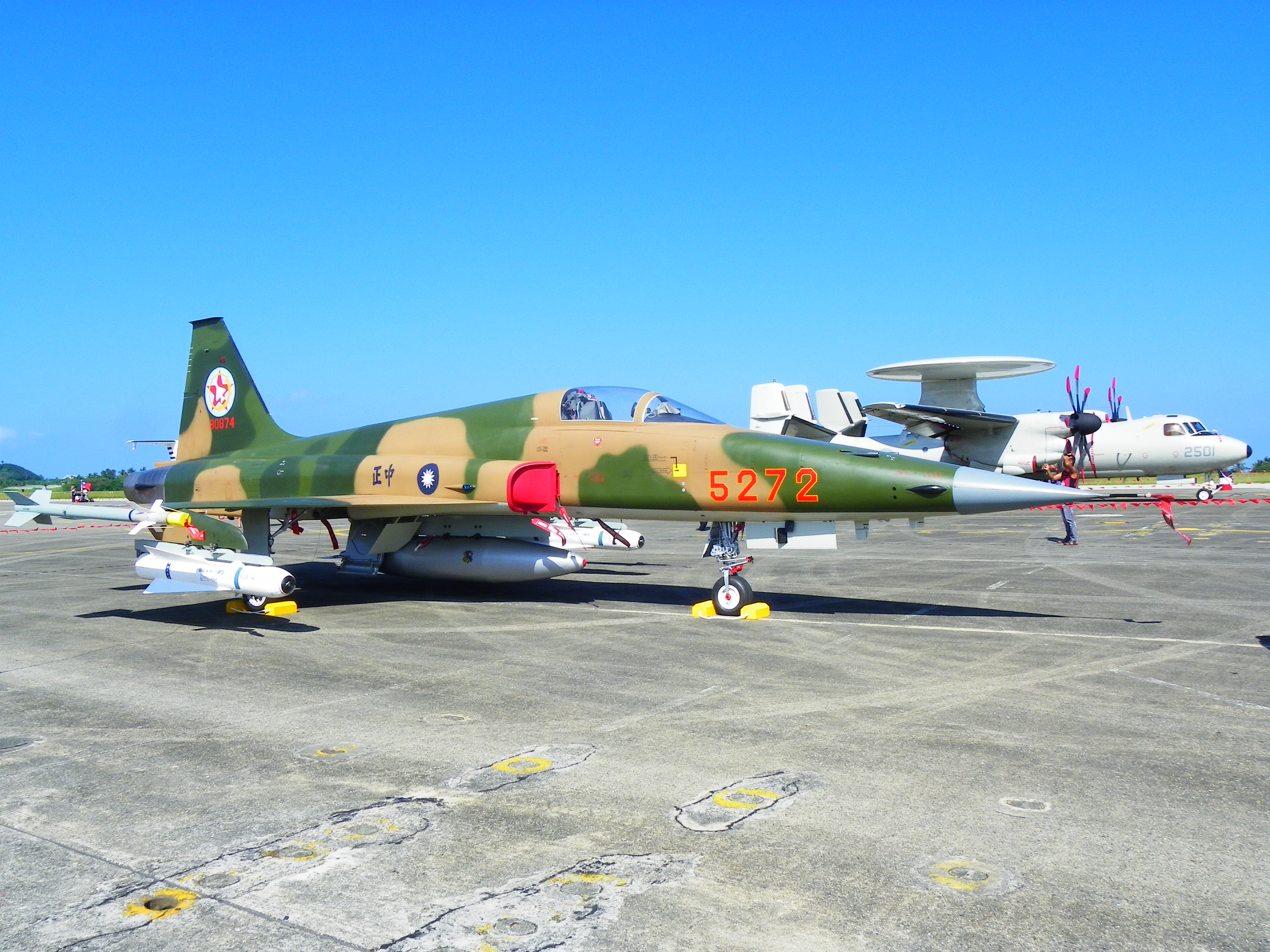
The 46th Tactical Fighter Squadron (Aggressor squadron) F-5E 5272 of Republic of China Air Force exhibited on the apron of Chihhang Air Base.

The Republic of China Air Force (ROCAF, Taiwan's air force) received its first batch of seven F-5As and two F-5Bs under the US Military Assistance Program in 1965. By 1971, the ROCAF was operating 72 F-5As and 11 F-5Bs. During 1972, the US borrowed 48 ROCAF F-5As to lend to the Republic of Vietnam Air Force before the withdrawal of US forces from Vietnam. By 1973, most of those loaned F-5As were not in flying condition, thus the US opted to return 20 F-5As to Taiwan by drawing nine F-5As from US reserves while repairing 11 from South Vietnam. An additional 28 new F-5Es were issued to Taiwan by May 1975. By 1973, Taiwan's AIDC started local production of a first batch of 100 F-5Es, the first of six Peace Tiger production batches. By end of 1986 when the production line closed after completing Peace Tiger 6, the AIDC had produced 242 F-5Es and 66 F-5Fs. Taiwan was the largest operator of the type at one time, having 336 F-5E/Fs in inventory. The last batch of AIDC F-5E/Fs featured the F-20's shark nose.

With the introduction of 150 F-16s, 60 Mirage 2000-5s and 130 F-CK-1s in the mid-to-late-1990s, the F-5E/F series became second line fighters in ROCAF service and mostly are now withdrawn from service as squadrons converted to new fighters entering ROCAF service. Seven low airframe hours F-5Es were sent to ST Aerospace to convert them to RF-5E Tigergazer standard to fulfill a reconnaissance role previously undertaken by the retiring Lockheed RF-104G in ROCAF service. As of 2009, only about 40 ROCAF F-5E/Fs still remain in service in training roles with about 90–100 F-5E/Fs held in reserve. The other retired F-5E/F are either scrapped, or used as decoys painted in colors representing the main front line F-16, Mirage 2000-5 or F-CK-1 fighters, and deployed around major air bases.

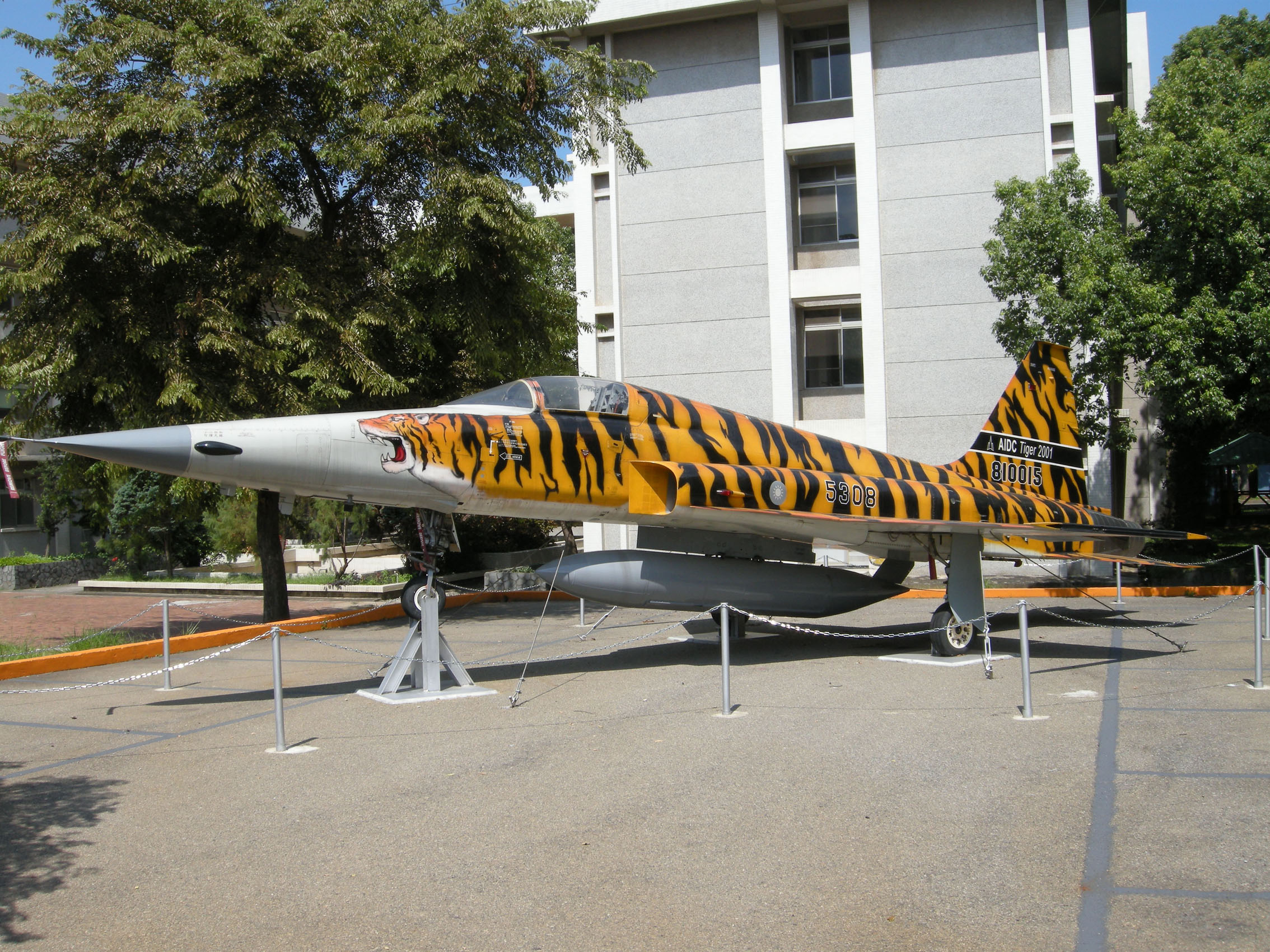
AIDC F-5E TIGER 2000

Taiwan also tried to upgrade the F-5E/F fleet with AIDC's Tiger 2000/2001 program. The first flight took place on 24 July 2002. The program would replace the F-5E/F's radar with F-CK-1's GD-53 radar and allow the fighter to carry a single TC-2 BVRAAM on the centerline. But lack of interest from the ROCAF eventually killed the program. The only prototype is on display in AIDC in Central Taiwan.

On 22 March 2021, two Taiwanese pilots flying F-5Es crashed into each other during a training mission resulting in the third crash within six months. Both pilots died after the crash.

All F-5Es were retired in November 2023, with the remaining F-5Fs and RF-5E Tigergazers retired in July 2025.

On August 16, 2026, reports from Paraguay suggest that the Paraguayan Air Force is considering to acquire AT-3 with the F-5E/F Tiger IIs in order to restore its supersonic combat capability, which is being weighed against the acquisition of six Super Tucanos worth $101.6 million.

=== Turkey ===
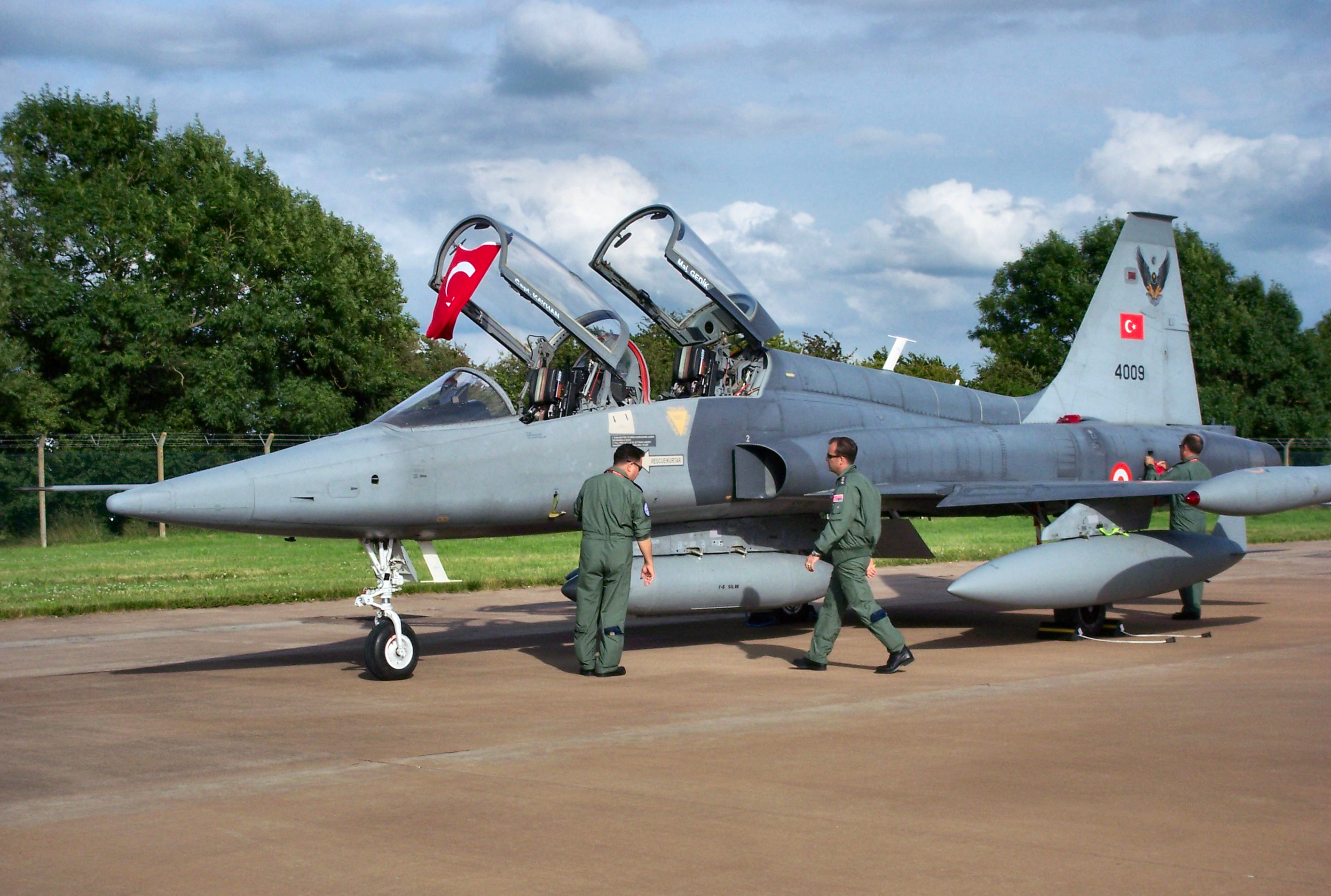
A F-5/2000

The Northrop F-5 Freedom Fighter has held an important place in the Turkish Air Force (Türk Hava Kuvvetleri – THK) since its introduction in the mid-1960s. Initially delivered through the United States' Military Assistance Program (MAP), the F-5A/B models served as light fighter-bombers and advanced jet trainers. In the late 1980s and early 1990s, Turkey expanded its F-5 fleet with the acquisition of NF-5A/B aircraft from the Royal Netherlands Air Force. These variants featured upgraded avionics and structural improvements compared to the original F-5 models. Many of these NF-5s became iconic through their use by Türk Yıldızları (Turkish Stars), the Air Force's elite aerobatic team.

To maintain the F-5's operational relevance and extend the aircraft's service life, Turkey launched the F-5/2000 modernization program in the late 1990s by Israeli Military Industries. This program aimed to upgrade 48 aircraft, primarily for use as lead-in fighter trainers to support the Turkish Air Force's F-16 fleet. The modernization involved extensive airframe life extension, improved cockpit ergonomics, and significant avionics upgrades. These included the integration of a modern head-up display (HUD), multifunction displays, a digital mission computer, and an embedded GPS/INS navigation system. Additionally, the aircraft received a new stores management system, enabling compatibility with modern training ordnance and systems. The result was a more capable and reliable platform for pilot training and support roles, bridging the technological gap between older jet trainers and fourth-generation fighters.

=== South Vietnam / Vietnam ===
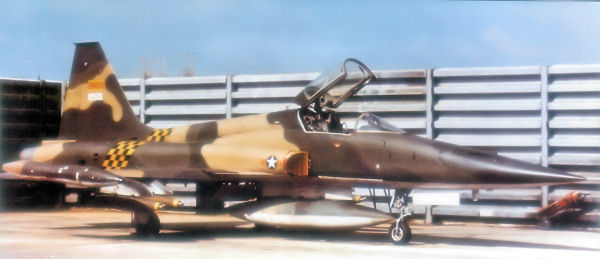
RVNAF F-5C Bien Hoa Air Base, 1971

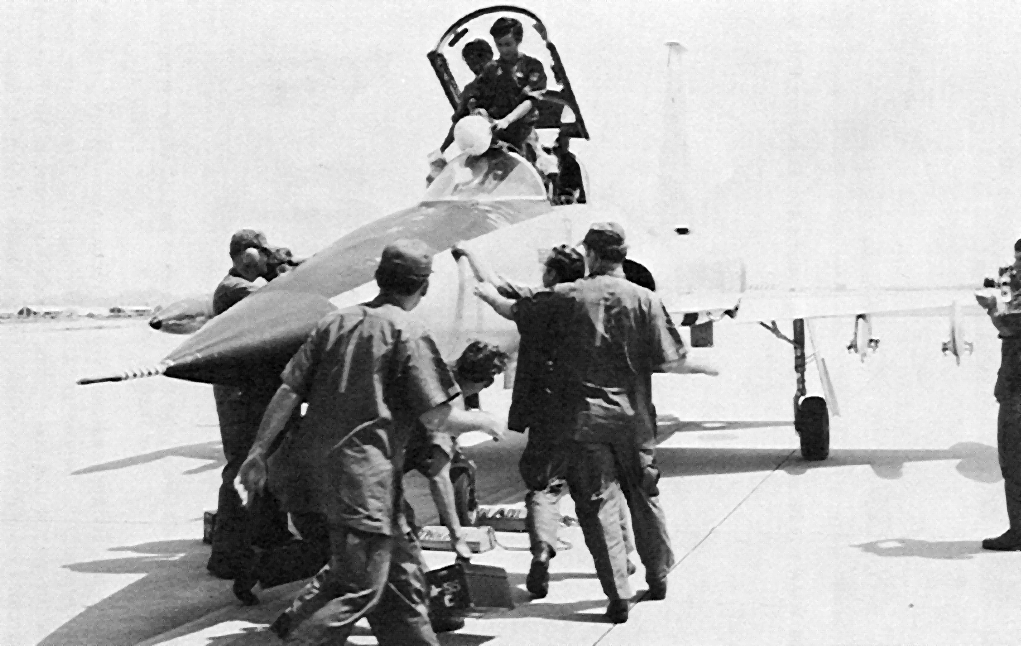
RNVAF F-5A after landing at U-Tapao Royal Thai Navy Airfield, 29 April 1975

In June 1967, the US donated the surviving aircraft of 10th FCS USAF to South Vietnam. The president of South Vietnam had asked the US for F-4 Phantoms, but these were in high demand, while the Republic of Vietnam Air Force (RVNAF) was flying only ground support missions, operating only Douglas A-1 Skyraider attackers at that point. In addition, the North Vietnamese Vietnam People's Air Force (VPAF) was not sending aircraft over South Vietnam. Hence the RVNAF did not require an aircraft with advanced air to air capabilities (like the F-4). A dedicated RVNAF unit was formed – the 522nd Fighter Squadron. The RVNAF flew F-5A/B, F-5C (ex Skoshi Tiger aircraft), RF-5A and later F-5E. In 1972, with assistance from the US; the RVNAF received F-5As from Iran and Taiwan to build up their inventory before a cease-fire was signed.

248 RVNAF aircraft were flown out of South Vietnam to Thailand during the Fall of Saigon in 1975. At least 23 F-5Es were reclaimed by the US, while one F-5B was transferred to Thailand. North Vietnam captured approximately 877 aircraft, of which 87 were reported as F-5As and 27 were F-5Es.

In November 1975, the Vietnamese government gave the Soviet military an opportunity to select captured US equipment for research and intelligence purposes. A complete F-5, along with two complete spare engines, spare parts, and ground support equipment, were loaded onto a Soviet cargo ship. Several other F-5s were later transferred by Vietnam to the USSR, Poland and Czechoslovakia.

The VPAF reportedly used 41 F-5s operationally. Others were decommissioned and put on display at museums in Vietnam. The 935th Fighter Regiment of the VPAF 372nd Air Division became the only unit in the world to simultaneously fly both the MiG-21 and F-5. The type was used for combat by the VPAF, in ground–attack sorties against the Khmer Rouge.

Gradually, a lack of critical spare parts in Vietnam caused initially by a US embargo and later by termination of manufacturing and dwindling stocks – grounded the remaining F-5s. However, in May 2017 it was reported that the VPAF was considering upgrading particular systems in some retired aircraft, in order to put them back into service.

=== Venezuela ===
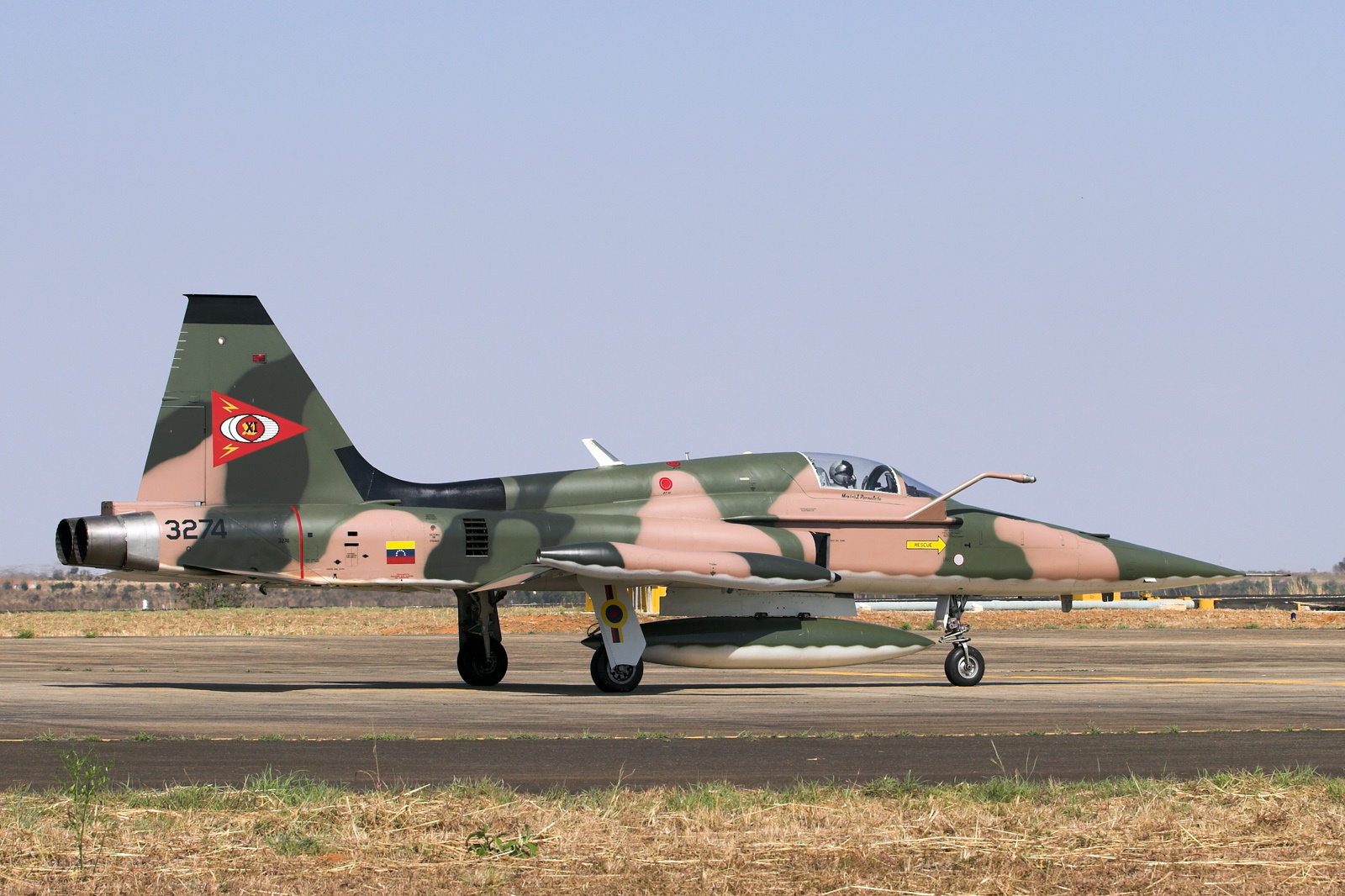
Venezuela Air Force Northrop (Canadair) VF-5A (CL-226)

After a reorganization of the Venezuelan Air Force in the late 1960s, the government realized that it was time to replace its obsolete de Havilland Vampires and Venoms active at that time, as well as the last surviving F-86 Sabres in active duty. In 1971, 54 Canadian-built CF-5As were put in storage, after the RCAF could not take them due to budget cuts. From this batch, Venezuela acquired 16 CF-5As and two CF-5Ds. In 1972, after all the aircraft were delivered, the F-86s, Venoms, and Vampires were finally scrapped.

The F-5 became the first military plane in Venezuela capable of flying at supersonic speeds. After a legal dispute between Canadair and Northrop, two more CF-5Ds were built and delivered to Venezuela in 1974. Their first base of operations was the General Rafael Urdaneta Air Base in Maracaibo. After 1974, the fleet was relocated to Teniente Vicente Landaeta Gil Air Base in Barquisimeto.

In 1979, after several upgrades to the fleet's communication, navigation and approximation equipment, the aircraft were renamed VF-5s, designating the CF-5As as VF-5As and the CF-5Ds as VF-5Ds. Venezuelan F-5s could also carry weaponry such as the AIM-9 Sidewinder missile, Mk.82 and M117 bombs, and 70mm rocket launchers.

In 1991, after tensions between Colombia and Venezuela almost led to a conflict, the air force started yet another modernization program for the F-5s, called "Proyecto Grifo" (Project Gryphon). Some aircraft (VF-5D number 5681 and VF-5A number 9124) were sent to Singapore for testing, then brought back for upgrade of the remaining airframes. That same year, a small fleet of four NF-5Bs and a single NF-5A, was acquired from the Netherlands to replace aircraft lost in previous years.

In 1992, during the coup d'état attempt against president Carlos Andres Perez, 3 F-5s were lost to a rebel-operated OV-10 Bronco bombing Barquisimeto Air Base. The failed coup delayed the modernization program for a year, finally coming together in 1993. The fleet was equipped with inertial laser navigation systems (similar to those in Venezuelan F-16s), IFFs, HUDs, refueling probes and modernized engines with an estimated lifespan of 22 years.

In 2002, small upgrades were made to the remaining F-5s. The fleet was kept operational until 2010, when a batch of Hongdu JL-8s was delivered as their replacement. By late 2010, it was known that at least one VF-5D was in flight-worthy condition; it is unknown if more aircraft are in operational condition.

Between 1972 and 2002, a total of 9 Venezuelan F-5s were lost.

=== Yemen ===
In March 1979, following North Yemen's defeat in the Yemenite War of 1979, the United States gave Saudi Arabia the permission to transfer four Northrop F-5B trainers to North Yemen. Additionally, Saudi Arabia financed the procurement of twelve F-5E fighters. By the end of the year, all 16 aircraft had arrived. This did not leave enough time to properly train local pilots and ground crews to operate them. Hence, the Saudis agreed with Taiwan to deploy a group of 80 Republic of China Air Force pilots and ground personnel to Sanaa. They formed the 112th Squadron of the Yemen Arab Republic Air Force (YARAF), which was also known as the Desert Squadron. Most of the Squadron's members were Taiwanese until 1985, by when enough Yemenis were trained on the F-5 to take over their duties. However, some Taiwanese personnel remained in the country: in 1990, no less than 700 Taiwanese served in Yemen. They were finally withdrawn in 1991, after the Yemeni unification.

North Yemeni F-5Es have seen combat during the 1994 civil war. On 6 May, two South Yemeni MiG-21s were claimed shot down by Major Nabi Ali Ahmad, using AIM-9 missiles. According to South Yemeni sources, only one MiG-21bis was shot down in an air combat, and its pilot killed. Reportedly, the North Yemenis subsequently deployed their Tiger IIs for air-to-air combat only. On 15 May, two helicopters (probably Mil Mi-8s) were shot down, one of them supposedly by Major Nabi Ali Ahmad. On 28 May, an F-5E was shot down by anti-aircraft fire. On 20 June, a South Yemeni MiG-21 was shot down over Al Anad Air Base in an air combat with two F-5Es, and its pilot was killed. Lastly, on 29 June, an encounter between two YARAF F-5Es and a single South Yemeni MiG-29 was reported. However, neither side opened fire.

Following the North's victory in the civil war, the F-5 fleet was integrated into the unified Yemeni Air Force. However, the number of F-5s in service declined over the years. In 2003, there were negotiations with Singapore for the overhaul and upgrade of the remaining aircraft. However, nothing came out of it. Around 2010, only six aircraft were operational, partly thanks to US aid packages. In the night of 29–30 March 2015, at least one F-5B and one F-5E were destroyed on the ground at Sanaa International Airport by Royal Saudi Air Force bombardments, in the first days of the Saudi-led intervention.

=== Others ===
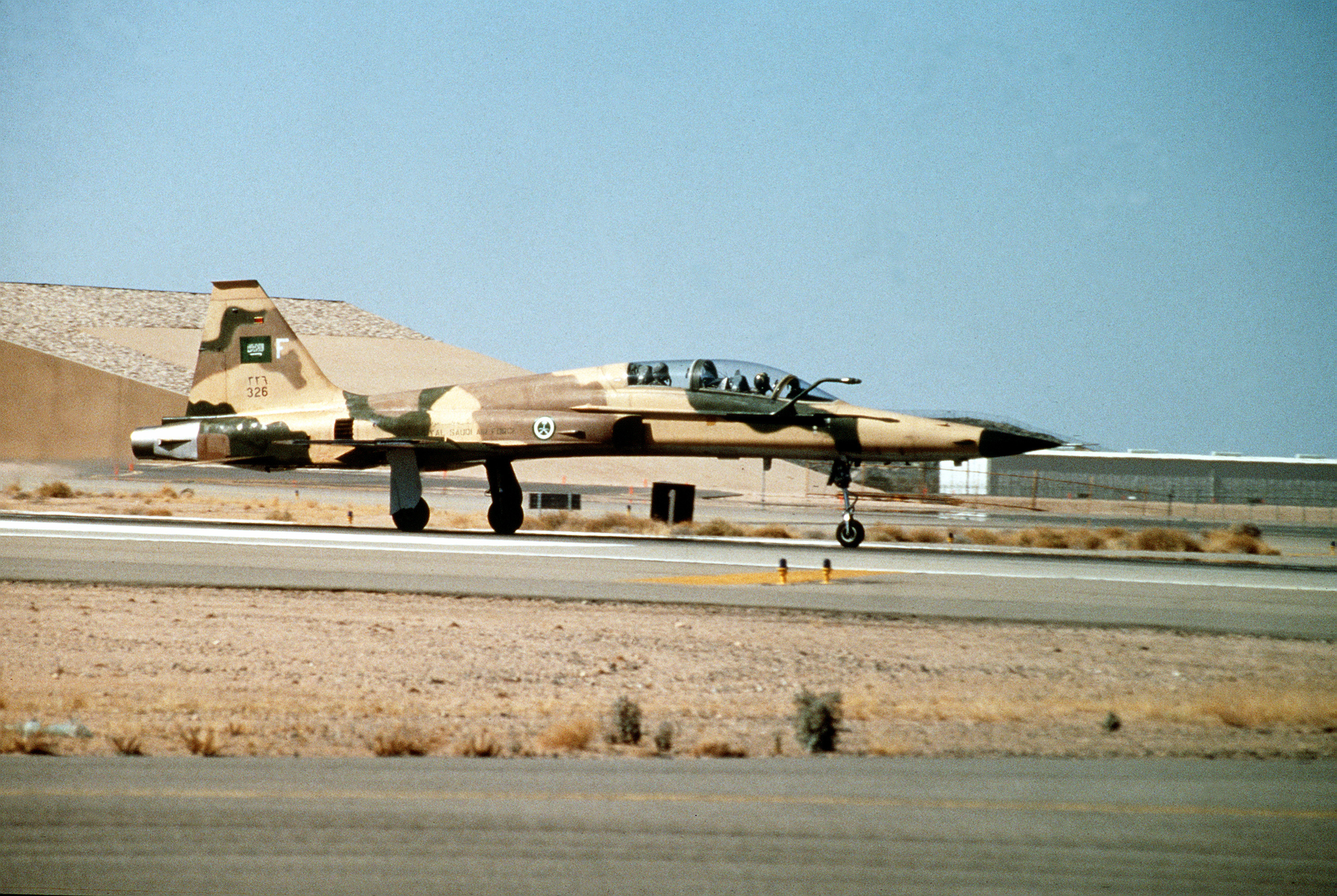
Royal Saudi Air Force F-5F taking off during the Gulf War.

Saudi Arabia deployed F-5Es during the Gulf War, flying close air support and aerial interdiction missions against Iraqi units in Kuwait. One Royal Saudi Air Force F-5E was lost to ground fire on 13 February 1991, resulting in the death of the pilot.

AeroGroup, a private commercial company in the US, operates the CF-5B as a fighter lead-in aircraft for training and for other support services. There were 17 aircraft originally purchased from the Canadian Government with US State Department approval and then imported into the US in 2006.

Since 2013, Tunisian F-5s have been used in strike missions in support of major military offensives in the border region of Mount Chaambi against Ansar al-Sharia and al-Qaeda-linked militants.

In the mid-2010s, Thailand starting modernization of their F-5s, with the F-5ST Super Tiger prototypes that evolved into the F-5TH Super Tigris production model.

F-5s were used by the Libyan Air Force at Wheelus Air Base in Tripoli, Libya from 1968 to 1969.

In 1978, the US offered Pakistan 40 F-5E Tiger II with equipment for US$400 million and other variants like the F-20 Tigershark, but Pakistan did not find the deal acceptable and bought the Chinese F-7MP/PG and A-5C instead.

== Variants ==
=== Single-seat versions ===
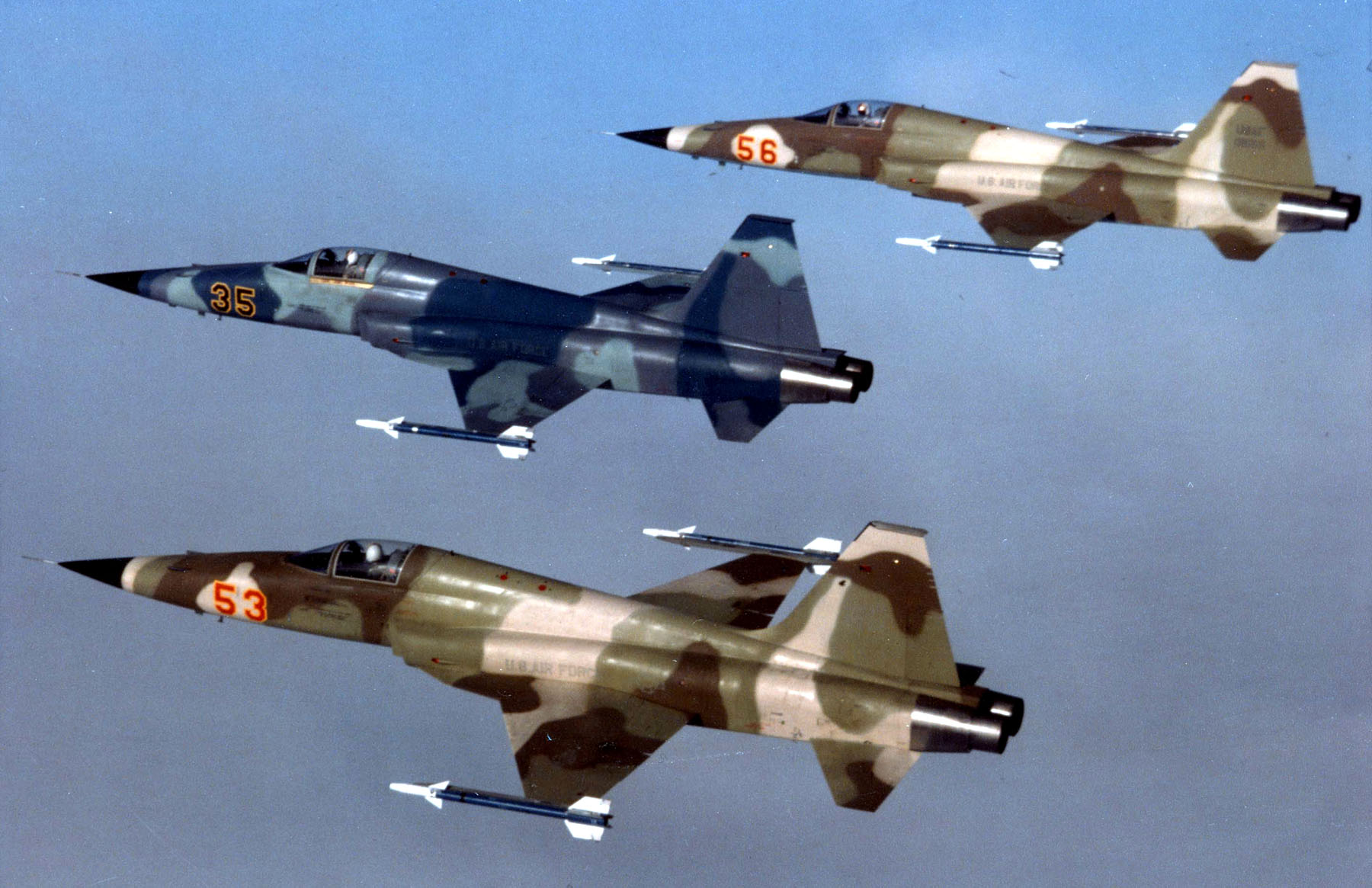
A trio of USAF aggressor squadron F-5Es in formation

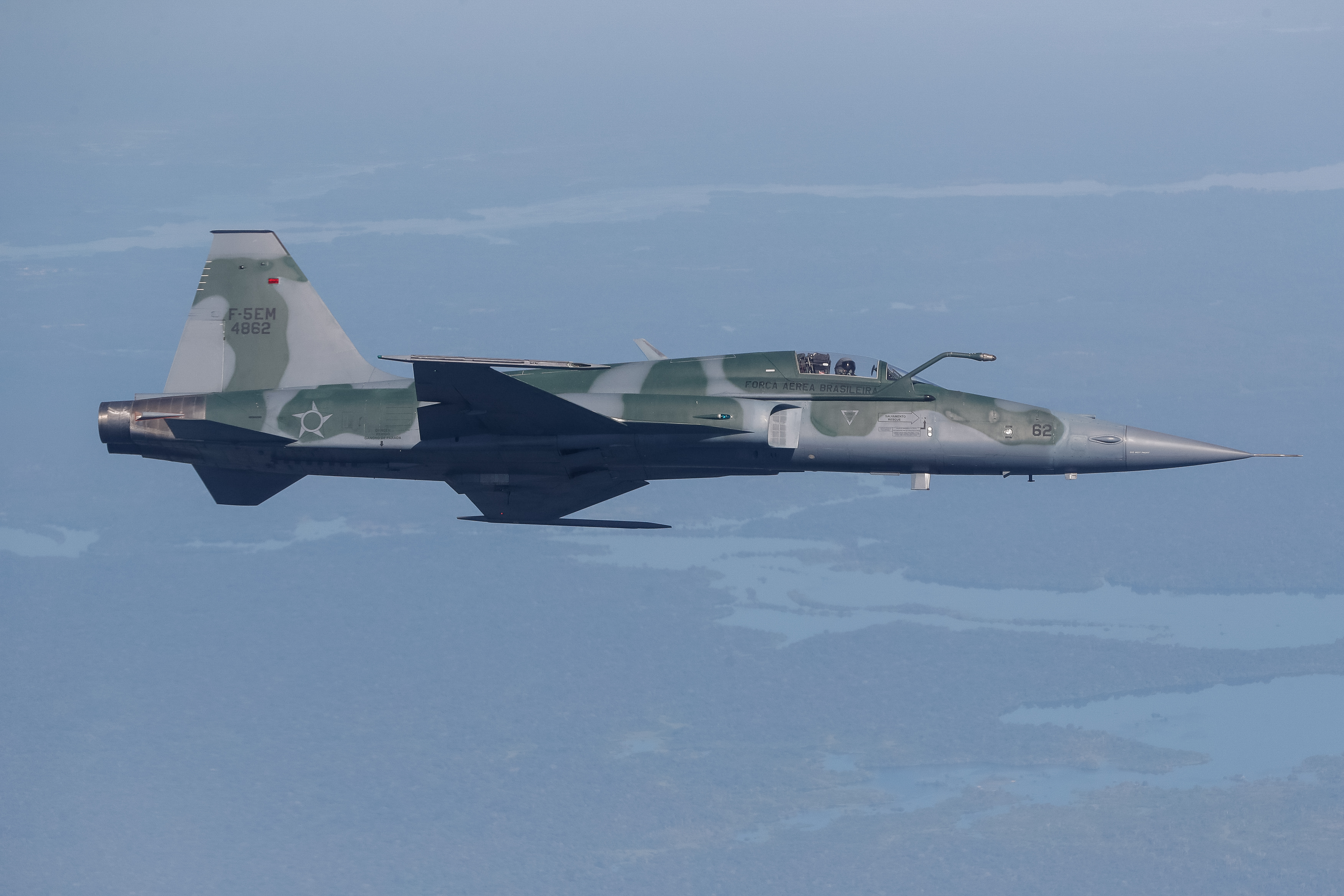
Brazilian Air Force F-5EM

N-156F
Single-seat fighter prototype. Only three aircraft were built.
YF-5A
The three prototypes were given the US Air Force designation YF-5A.
F-5A
Single-seat fighter version of F-5, originally without radar, but was later equipped with AN/APQ-153 radar during upgrades.
F-5A (G)
Single-seat fighter version of the F-5A for the Royal Norwegian Air Force.
XF-5A
Designation was given to one aircraft used for static tests.
F-5C Skoshi Tiger
Twelve F-5A Freedom Fighters were tested by the US Air Force for four and a half months in Vietnam. Modified at Palmdale plant by adding removable, non retractable air-refueling probe on the left side, 90 lb of external armor plates under the cockpit and engine, and jettisonable stores pylons.
F-5E Tiger II
Single-seat fighter version with AN/APQ-159, replacing earlier AN/APQ-153.
F-5E Tiger III

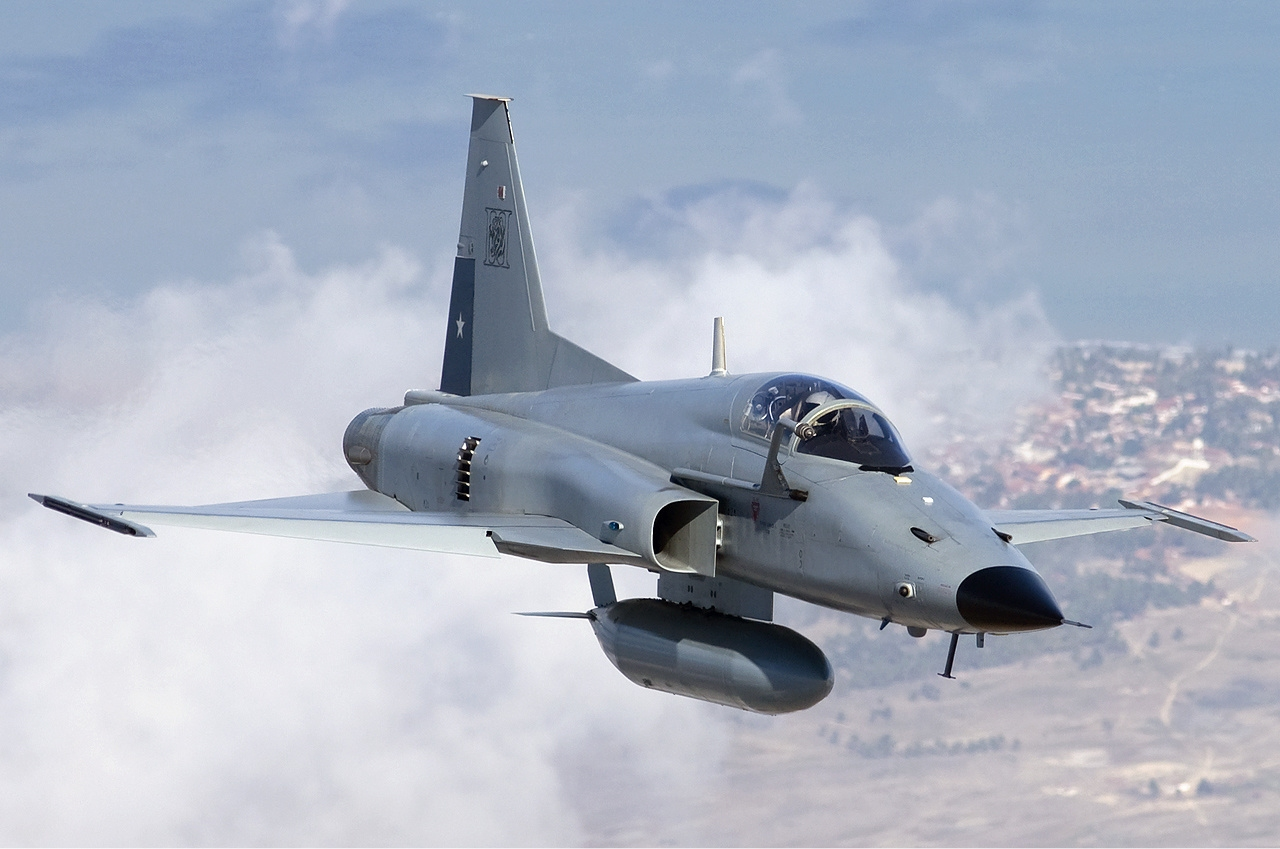
Chilean Air Force F-5E Tiger III

Upgraded version of the F-5E in use by the Chilean Air Force, with EL/M-2032 radar replacing the original AN/APQ-159 and capable of firing advanced versions of the Python missile
F-5E/F
A single, prototype built for the Swiss Air Force, comprising an F-5E fuselage and tail section, with wings from an F-5F. As of 2011, this aircraft was at the Meiringen Air Base Museum.
F-5G
The temporary designation given to the Northrop F-20 Tigershark, equipped with General Electric AN/APG-67 radar.
F-5N
Ex-Swiss Air Force F-5Es used by the US Navy as an "adversary" aircraft, with AN/APG-69 replacing the original AN/APQ-159. Intended to replace high-time USN/USMC F-5Es in the adversary role, and saw service through 2015. F-5N+/F-5F+ – F-5N and F-5F are also modernized with Garmin G3000 for a longer lifespan in the USN.
F-5S
Upgraded version of the F-5E, was in use with the Republic of Singapore Air Force, equipped with the Galileo Avionica's FIAR Grifo-F X-band radar and are capable of firing the AIM-120 AMRAAM.
F-5ST Super Tiger
Initial name reported for the F-5TH.
F-5T Tigris
Modernized F-5E for the Royal Thai Air Force, twelve aircraft was modernized by Israeli IAI/Elbit Systems between 2003–2004 (contract awarded in 2003).
F-5TH Super Tigris
Initially called F-5ST Super Tiger, modernized version of the Royal Thai F-5T by Israeli IAI, Elbit Systems, Rafael Advanced Defense Systems, and Thai company RV Connex, upgraded with new software and hardware. It has a new glass cockpit and head-up display upgrade and equipped with EL/M-2032 radar, RTAF-developed Link-T/TH tactical datalink, Sky Shield jamming pod and are capable of firing the AIM-9M, IRIS-T, Python-4 and beyond visual range air-to-air Derby missile.
F-5EM
Upgraded version of the F-5E of Brazilian Air Force equipped with Italian Grifo-F radar.
F-5TIII
Upgraded version of the F-5E, in service with the Royal Moroccan Air Force.
F-5E Tiger 2000
Upgraded version of Taiwan AIDC, equipped with the GD-53 radar, capable of firing the TC-2 Sky Sword II, MIL-STD-1553B Link and GPS/INS. This variant did not enter service as the ROCAF decided to acquire additional F-16s instead to completely replace its F-5E/Fs.
F-5/2000
The F-5/2000 modernisation programme for the Turkish Air Force was to upgrade the NF-5A/B and F-5A/B jets, to serve as lead-in trainers for the F-16C/D, by Israeli Aerospace Industries and Turkish Aerospace. The upgrade covers two areas – with a structural upgrade as well as an avionics modernisation such as MIL-STD-553 datalink, HUD, MFD, HOTAS, RWR, GPS+INS and ASELSAN CNI system. Currently used by the Turkish Stars Team.

=== Reconnaissance versions ===
RF-5A
Single-seat reconnaissance version of the F-5A fighter. Approximately 120 were built.
RF-5A (G)
Single-seat reconnaissance version of the F-5A fighter for the Royal Norwegian Air Force.
RF-5E Tigereye
Single-seat reconnaissance version of the F-5E fighter. The RF-5E Tigereye was exported to Saudi Arabia and Malaysia.
RF-5E Tigergazer
Seven upgraded single-seat reconnaissance version of the F-5E for Taiwan by ST Aerospace.
RF-5S Tigereye
Single-seat reconnaissance version of the F-5S for the Republic of Singapore Air Force.

=== Two-seat versions ===
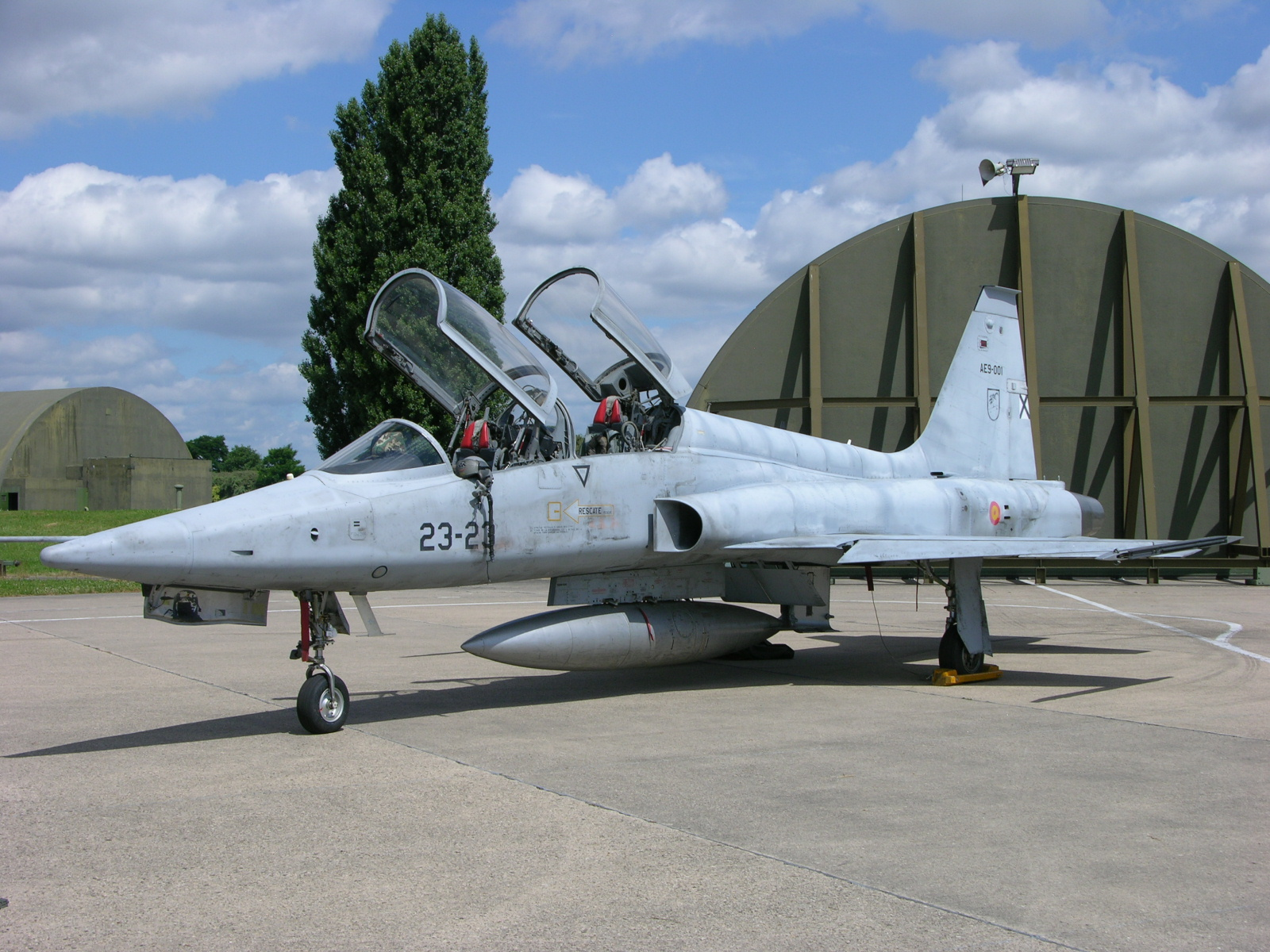
A Spanish SF-5M Freedom Fighter at Dijon Air Base

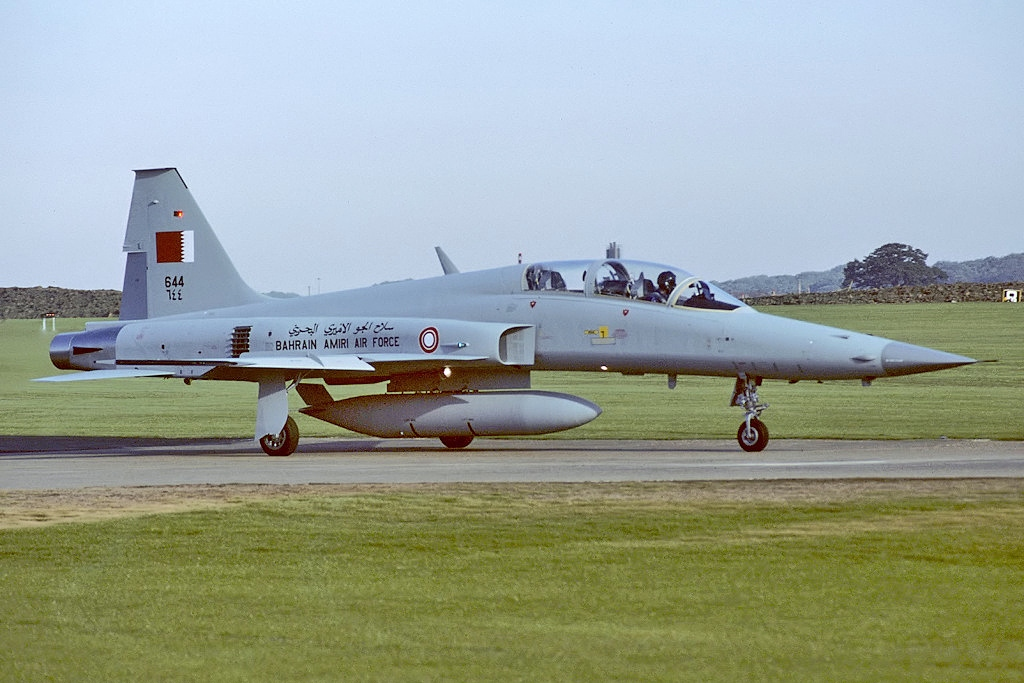
A Bahraini Air Force F-5F on the taxiway at RAF Alconbury

F-5-21
Temporary designation for the YF-5B.
YF-5B
One F-5B was fitted with a 5,000 lbf (2,268 kgf) General Electric J85-GE-21 engine, and used as a prototype for the F-5E Tiger II.
F-5B
Two-seat trainer version.
F-5B(G)
Two-seat trainer version of the F-5B for the Royal Norwegian Air Force.
F-5BM
Two-seat trainer version in use by the Spanish Air and Space Force for air combat training. The modernized F-5BM is designated SF-5M (AE.9).
F-5D
Unbuilt trainer version.
F-5F Tiger II
Two-seat trainer version of F-5E Tiger II, AN/APQ-167 radar tested, intended to replace AN/APQ-157, but not carried out.
F-5F Tiger III
Upgraded trainer version of the F-5F in use by the Chilean Air Force.
F-5T
Upgraded F-5F, was in service with the Republic of Singapore Air Force.
F-5TF Tigris
Modernized F-5F for the Royal Thai Air Force, 3 aircraft was modernized by Israeli IAI/Elbit Systems between 2003–2004 (contract awarded in 2003).
F-5THF Super Tigris
Modernized version of the Royal Thai F-5TF by Israeli IAI, Elbit Systems, Rafael Advanced Defense Systems, and Thai company RV Connex, upgraded with new software and hardware. It has a new glass cockpit and head-up display upgrade and equipped with EL/M-2032 radar, RTAF-developed Link-T/TH tactical datalink, Sky Shield jamming pod and are capable of firing the AIM-9M, IRIS-T, Python-4 and beyond visual range air-to-air Derby missile.
F-5FM
Upgraded trainer version of the F-5F for the Brazilian Air Force.

=== Foreign variants ===
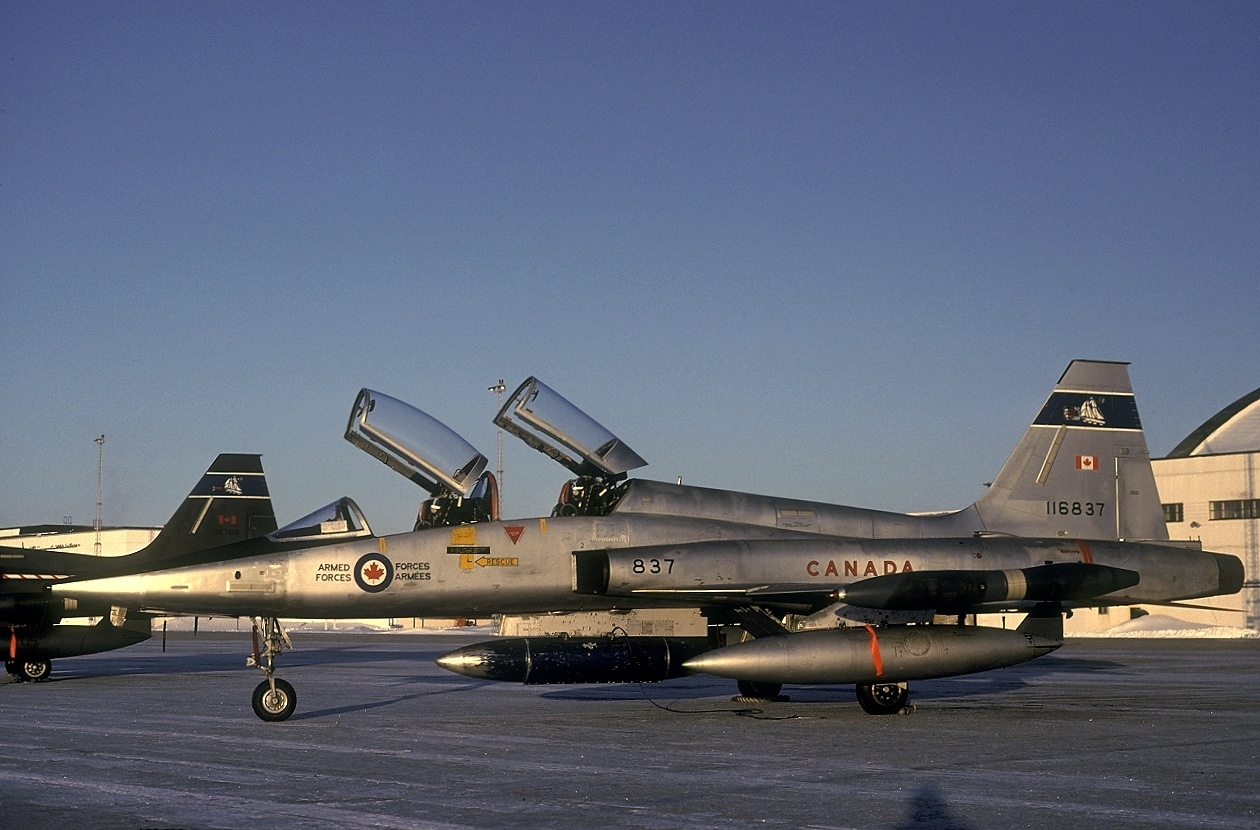
A Canadian Air Force CF-116D

==== Licensed versions ====
CF-5

Fighter versions for the Canadian Forces Air Command built under license by Canadair. Its Canadian designation is CF-116; 89 single-seat and 46 dual-seat were built for Canada. Total production of 240.
NF-5A
Single-seat fighter version of the CF-5A for the Royal Netherlands Air Force; 75 single-seat built in Canada.
NF-5B
Two-seat training version of the CF-5D for the Royal Netherlands Air Force; 30 built in Canada.

SF-5A
Single-seat fighter version of the F-5A for the Spanish Air and Space Force; built under license in Spain by CASA.
SRF-5A
Single-seat reconnaissance version of the RF-5A for the Spanish Air and Space Force; built under license in Spain by CASA.
SF-5B
Two-seat training version of the F-5B for the Spanish Air and Space Force. Built under license by CASA in Spain.

VF-5A
Single-seat version of the CF-5A for the Venezuelan Air Force. This designation was given to some Canadair CF-116s which were sold to the Venezuelan Air Force.
VF-5D
Two-seat training version of the CF-5D for the Venezuelan Air Force.

KF-5E
F-5E built in South Korea for the Republic of Korea Air Force. First introduction: September 1982; 48 built.
KF-5F
F-5F built in South Korea for the Republic of Korea Air Force. First introduction: September 1982; 20 built.

Chung Cheng
F-5E/F built in Taiwan for Republic of China Air Force by AIDC. First introduction: 30 October 1974, one day before President Chiang Kai-shek's 88th birthday, and was thus christened "Chung Cheng", the true name of President Chiang; 308 built.

==== Unlicensed versions ====
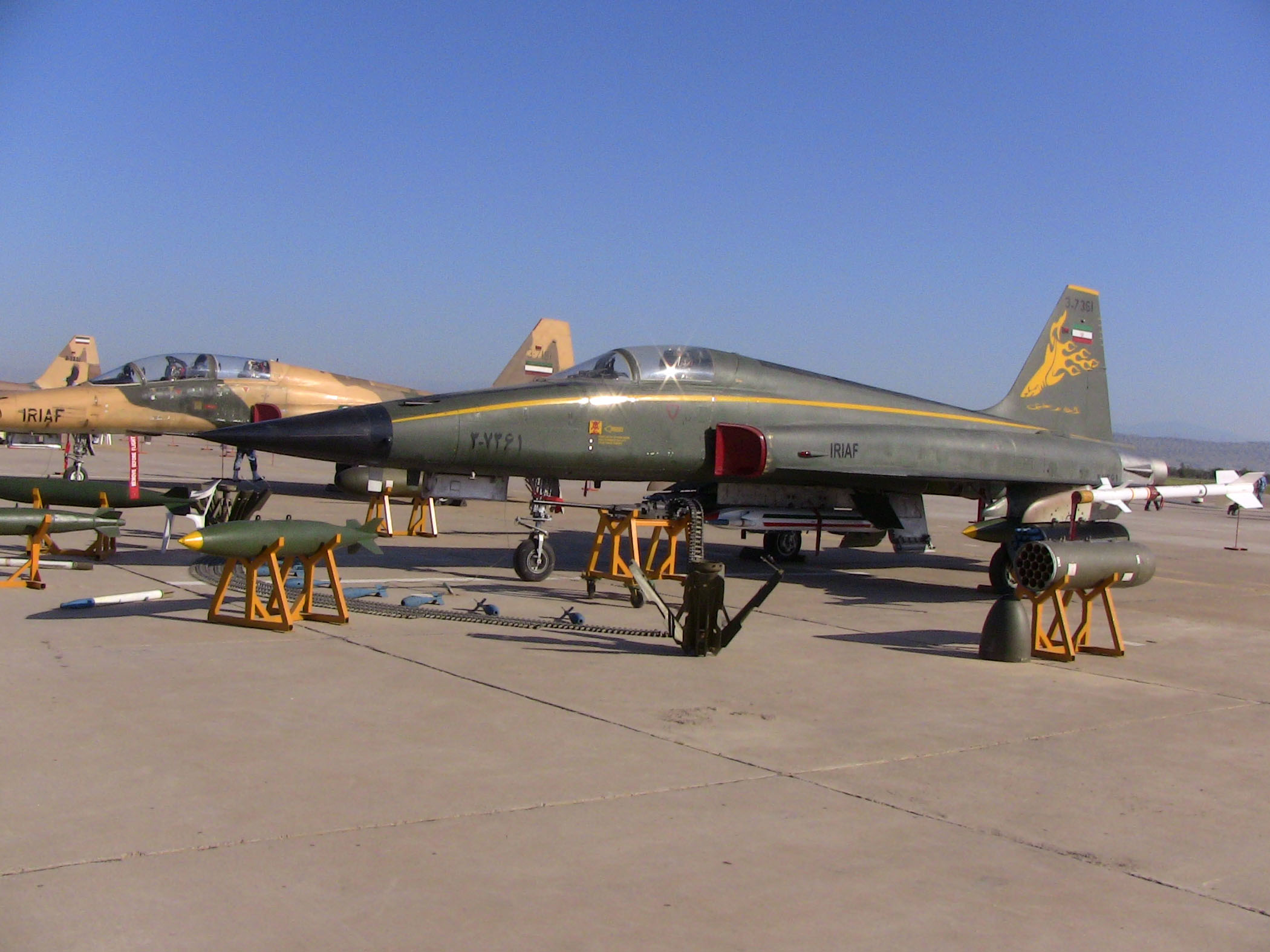
Iranian Azarakhsh

Azarakhsh
F-5E built or modified in Iran with unknown changes and mid-wing intakes.
Sa'eqeh
F-5E modified in Iran with canted, twin vertical stabilizers.
Kowsar
Two-seat F-5F built or modified in Iran.

==== Foreign designations ====
Spanish Air and Space Force

- C.9 – F-5A (C = caza, "chase, pursuit"); redesignated A.9
- A.9 – F-5A, F-5M (A = ataque, "attack"); originally designated C.9
- AR.9 – RF-5 (AR = ataque, reconocimiento, "attack, reconnaissance")
- AE.9 – F-5BM and SF-5M (AE = ataque, entrenamiento, "attack, training")

Royal Thai Air Force, the F-5 is designated B.Kh.18 (Thai: บ.ข.๑๘) > Bin.Khàp-lâi.18 (บิน.ขับไล่.๑๘, lit. 'fly.repel.18'), "fighter aircraft 18".

- B.Kh.18 (บ.ข.๑๘) – F-5A Freedom Fighter
- B.Kh.18B (บ.ข.๑๘ข) – F-5E Tiger II (twelve in 1995) → F-5T Tigris (twelve modernized by IAI/Elbit in 1999/2003–2004) → F-5TH Super Tigris (eleven modernized by IAI/Elbit, seven in 2010, four in 2017)
- B.T.Kh.18 (บ.ต.ข.๑๘) – RF-5A Freedom Fighter
- B.Kh.18K (บ.ข.๑๘ก) – F-5B Freedom Fighter
- B.Kh.18Kh2 (Note: The Thai suffix ค is transliterated the same as the letter ข (kh), thus variously appearing as kh^{1} and kh^{2}; whence the designation appears as both B.Kh.18Kh and B.Kh.18Kh2.) (บ.ข.๑๘ค) – F-5F Tiger II (six in 1995) → F-5TF Tigris (three modernized by IAI/Elbit from 2003) → F-5THF Super Tigris (three modernized by IAI/Elbit in 2014–2019)

=== Derivatives ===
==== F-20 Tigershark ====
In comparison to later fighters, the improved F-5E had some weaknesses; these included marginal acceleration, rearward visibility, and fuel fraction, and a lack of Beyond Visual Range (BVR) weapons once such radar–guided missiles became reliable during the 1980s. The F-5G, later renamed the F-20 Tigershark, aimed to correct these weaknesses while maintaining a small size and low cost to produce a competitive fighter. Compared to the F-5E, it had 60% more power, a higher climb rate and acceleration, better cockpit visibility, more modern radar and BVR capability, and competitive performance with fourth generation fighters. Like the F-5, it had better cost–effectiveness as it had the minimum necessary features relative to its competition to perform its air superiority mission. As an example, in the 1960s and early 1970s, the F-5's lack of BVR missiles was not a significant disadvantage as the kill rate of such missiles was approximately 8% to 10%, and the performance and loss of surprise (radar warning to the enemy) cost of carrying them was not practically justified. By the early 1980s, the American AIM-7 Sparrow radar-guided missile in its "M" version was realistically exceeding a 60% kill rate, and was integrated onto the F-20. Brigadier General Chuck Yeager, test pilot and the first man to break the sound barrier, referred to the F-20 as "the finest fighter". Despite its performance and affordable cost, the F-20 lost out for foreign sales against the similarly capable but more expensive F-16, which was being procured in large numbers by the US Air Force and was viewed as having greater support.

==== Northrop YF-17 ====
The Northrop YF-17's main design elements date from the F-5 based internal Northrop project N-300. The N-300 featured a longer fuselage, small leading-edge root extensions (LERX), and more powerful GE15-J1A1 turbojets. The wing was moved higher on the fuselage to increase ordnance flexibility. The N-300 further evolved into the P-530 Cobra. The P-530's wing planform and nose section was similar to the F-5, with a trapezoidal shape formed by a sweep of 20° at the quarter-chord line, and an unswept trailing edge, but was over double the area. While the YF-17 lost its bid for the USAF lightweight fighter, it would be developed into the larger McDonnell Douglas F/A-18 Hornet.

==== Shaped Sonic Boom Demonstration ====
A single ex-USN F-5E was modified to carry out research into reducing noise from supersonic flight by shaping the shock waves produced by the aircraft.

== Operators ==
=== Current operators ===
Bahrain

- Bahrain Air Force received eight F-5Es and two F-5Fs in between 1985 and 1987. As of 2024 they operate 12 F-5E/Fs for conversion training.

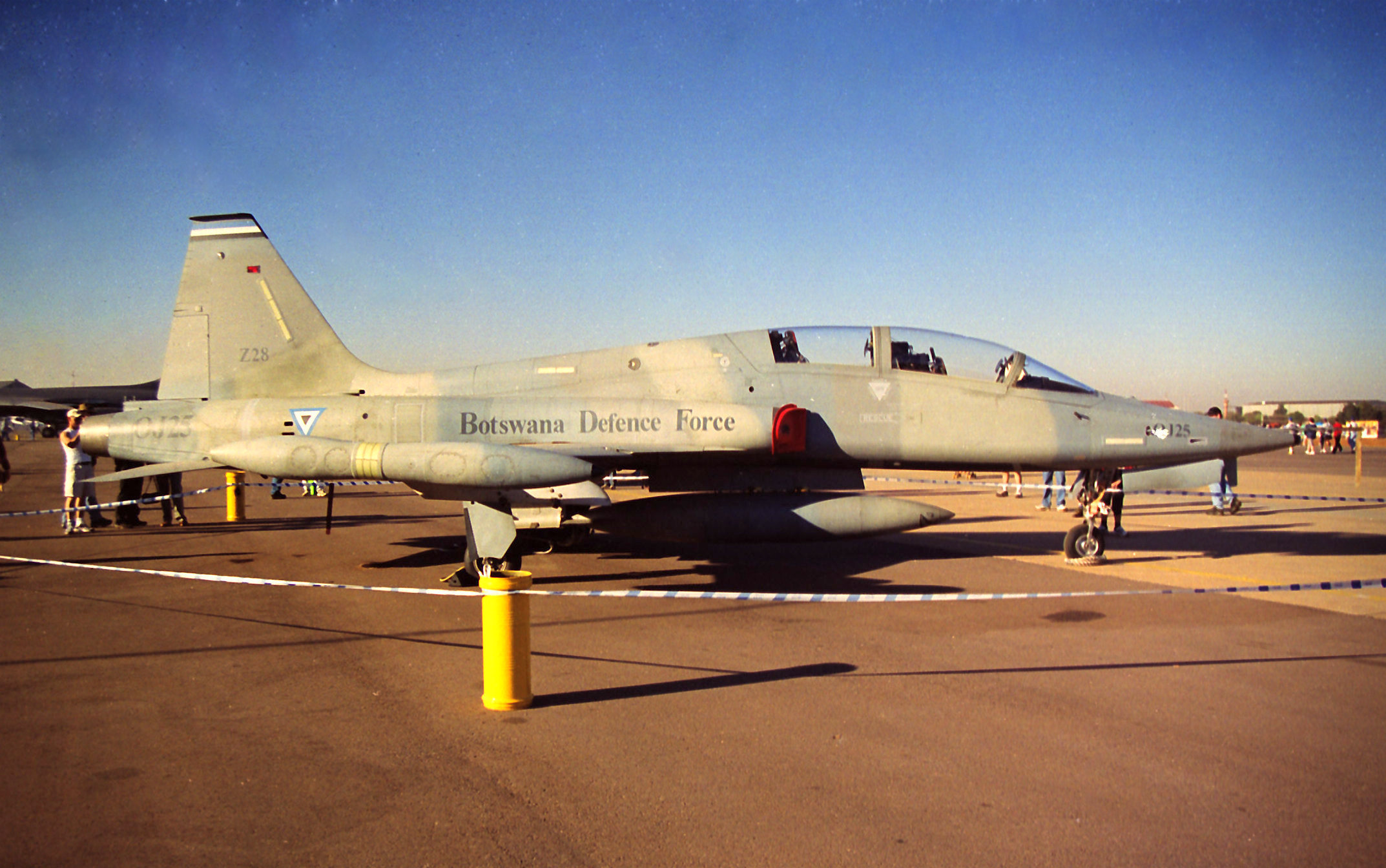
CF-5 of the Botswana Defence Force

Botswana

- Botswana Air Force purchased 10 upgraded CF-5As and 3 CF-5Ds from Canada in 1996. A further three CF-5A and two CF-5D were purchased in 2000. 11 CF-5A and 4 CF-5D were in service in 2024.

Brazil

- Brazilian Air Force purchased 79 F-5s of different variants from 1973. Operates 35 F-5EM and 4 F-5FM as of 2024, with the type being withdrawn gradually between 2022 and 2029, replaced by the JAS 39E/F Gripen.

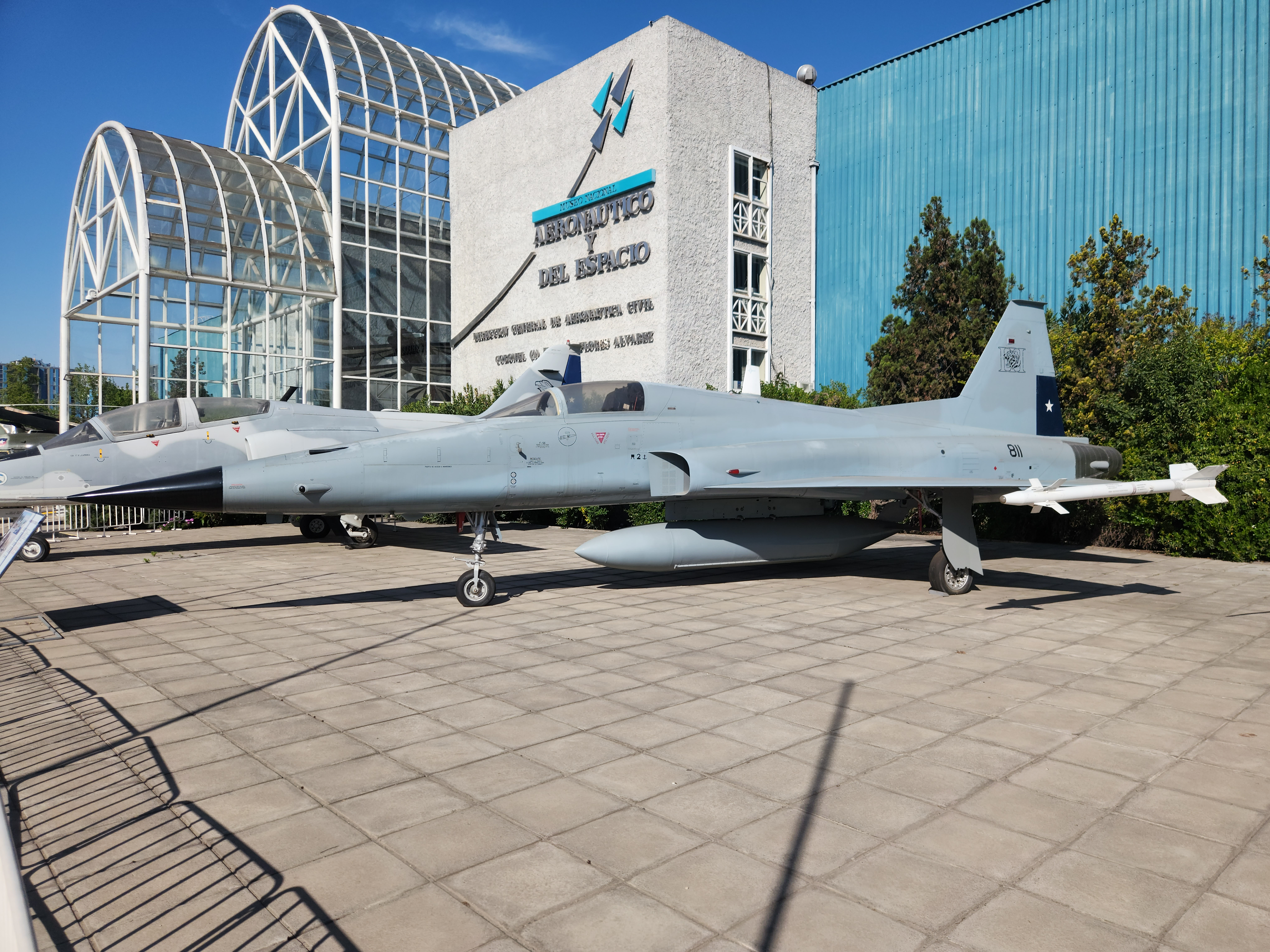
Chilean F-5E Tiger III Plus at the National Aeronautical and Space Museum in Chile

Chile

- Chilean Air Force: Chile purchased 15 F-5Es and 3 F-5Fs in the 1970s, these being upgraded to Tiger III standard in 1993. A total of 10 F-5s are in use as of 2009. In March 2013, the Uruguayan Air Force initiated talks for procuring 12 surplus F-5 Tiger III aircraft from Chile for $80 million. However, 13 aircraft continue in service with the Chilean Air Force as of 2024.

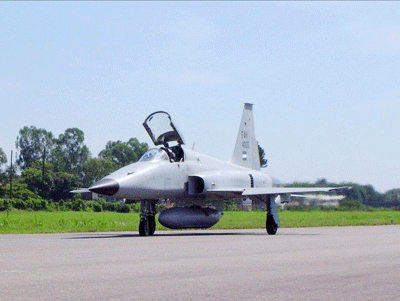
A Honduran Air Force F-5E

Honduras

- Honduran Air Force: The United States delivered 10 F-5E and 2 F-5Fs starting in 1987, as replacements for Dassault Super Mystére, which were reassigned to airstrike as they were in their last years of service. The F-5 were refurbished former United States Air Force aircraft. Four F-5Es and two F-5Fs remain in service as of 2024.

Iran

- Islamic Republic of Iran Air Force: 35 F-5E and 15 F-5F estimated operational as of 2024; Iran originally had received a total of 127 F-5A/B by 1972 which soon began to be phased out/sold to other countries. By 1976 Iran had received a total of 181 of the improved F-5E/F/RF-A delivered to the Imperial Iranian Air Force.
- Unknown numbers of HESA Saeqeh and HESA Azarakhsh fighters derived from the F-5 design.

Kenya

- Kenya Air Force: In July 2008, it was reported that Kenya will spend KSh.1.5 billion to buy 15 former Jordanian Air Force F-5s, 13 F-5E and two F-5F upgraded with Rockwell Collins avionics (plus training and spare parts). They will be added or eventually replace the existing F-5 fleet. Seventeen F-5Es and six F-5Fs remain in service as of 2024.

Mexico

- Mexican Air Force received 12 F-5s in 1982. They operated eight F-5Es and two F-5F until being retired in 2017. Three Mexican F-5Es and one F-5F were in service as of 2024.

Morocco

- Royal Moroccan Air Force operates 12 F-5A/Bs upgraded with Tiger II avionics and 24 upgraded F-5 Tiger III. 22 F-5Es and 4 F-5Fs remain in service as of 2024.

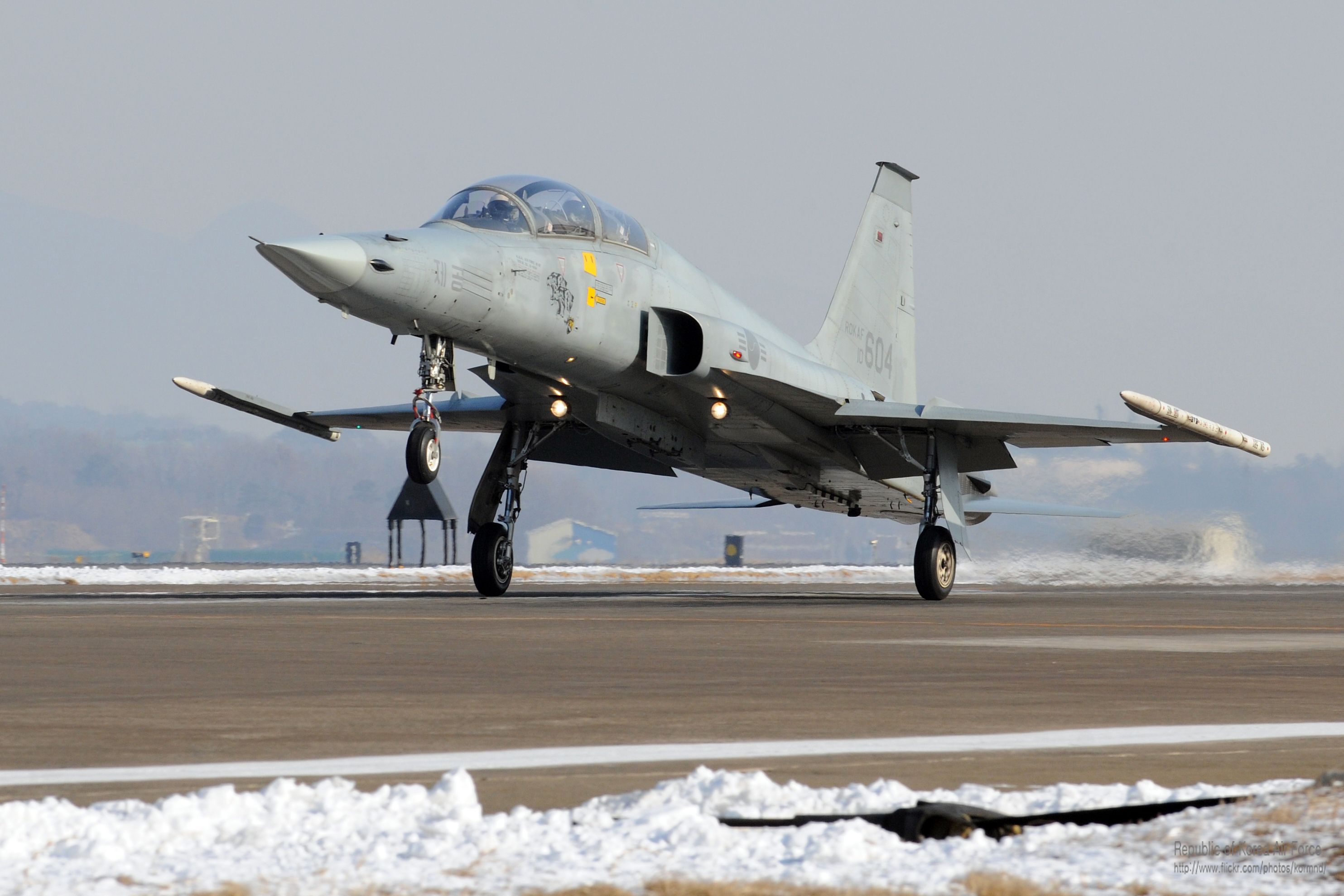
A South Korean Air Force KF-5F takes off

South Korea

- Republic of Korea Air Force: Received a total of 340 F-5s (88 F-5A, 30 F-5B, 8 RF-5A, 126 F-5E, 20 F-5F, 48 KF-5E, and 20 KF-5F). During the Vietnam War, 36 F-5As and 8 RF-5As were transferred to the Republic of Vietnam Air Force in exchange of F-4 Phantom II from the United States Air Force. 5 RF-5As were brought back to Korea before the war ended. The last Freedom Fighter retired in 2005, and 8 F-5As were donated to the Philippine Air Force. The ROKAF plans to replace the US made F-5E/Fs with 60 new FA-50 aircraft and KAI KF-X. 138 F-5Es and 29 F-5Fs remain in service as of 2024. ROKAF plans to retire all F-5 aircraft by 2027.

Spain

- Spanish Air and Space Force operates 19 F-5BM as trainers for fighter school. Initially, 70 fighters version A and B were delivered. 19 F-5Ms remained in use in 2024.

Switzerland

- Swiss Air Force: Operating 42 F-5E and 12 F-5F Tiger II. 110 F-5E/F12 were delivered, including 90 whose final assembly was done in Switzerland. After numerous tests, as part of the 1975 armament program, the federal parliament approved the purchase of 72 F-5 Tiger IIs in 1976, including 66 of the F-5E type (single-seater) and 6 of the F-5F type (two-seater) for the protection of airspace (formerly called air protection) for 1.17 billion Swiss francs. The F-5 was chosen because it was easier to maintain than the F-16. A second tranche of 38 Tigers, including six two-seaters (F-5F), were ordered as part of the 1981 armament program for 770 million Swiss francs. The last aircraft in this series rolled off the assembly line at F+W Emmen in 1984.

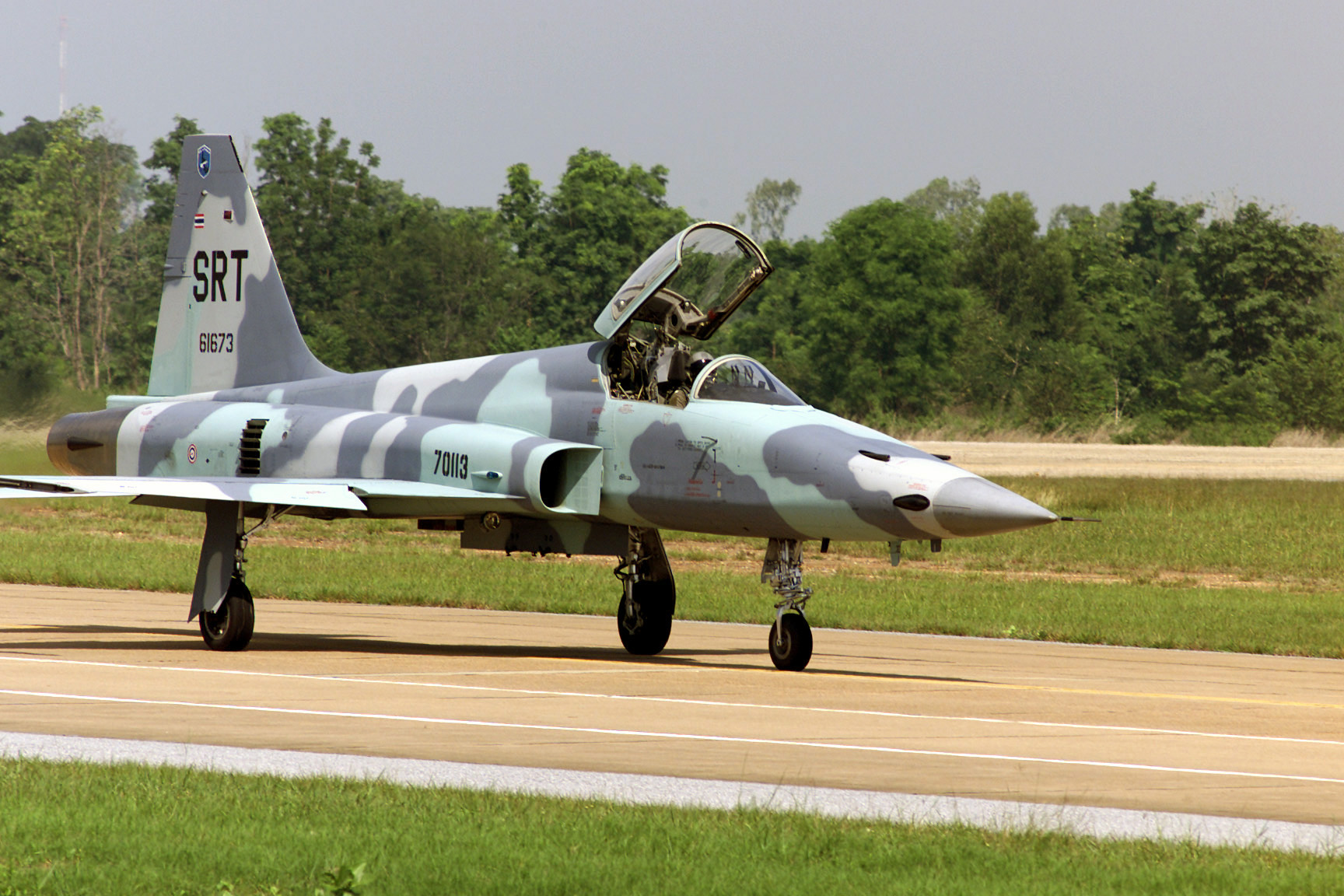
A Royal Thai Air Force Northrop F-5E Tiger II

Thailand

- Royal Thai Air Force: 30 F-5A/B/C and 15 F-5E/F retired. Now operating about 33 F-5E/F/T. The last F-5 fleet, upgraded into F-5TH and F-5THF in 211th Sq. continue to serve until 2025–2030.

Tunisia

- Tunisian Air Force: Eight F-5E and four F-5F Tiger II were delivered in 1984–1985. The TAF received five ex-USAF F-5E in 1989. Eleven F-5Es and 3 F-5Fs were in service as of December 2021.

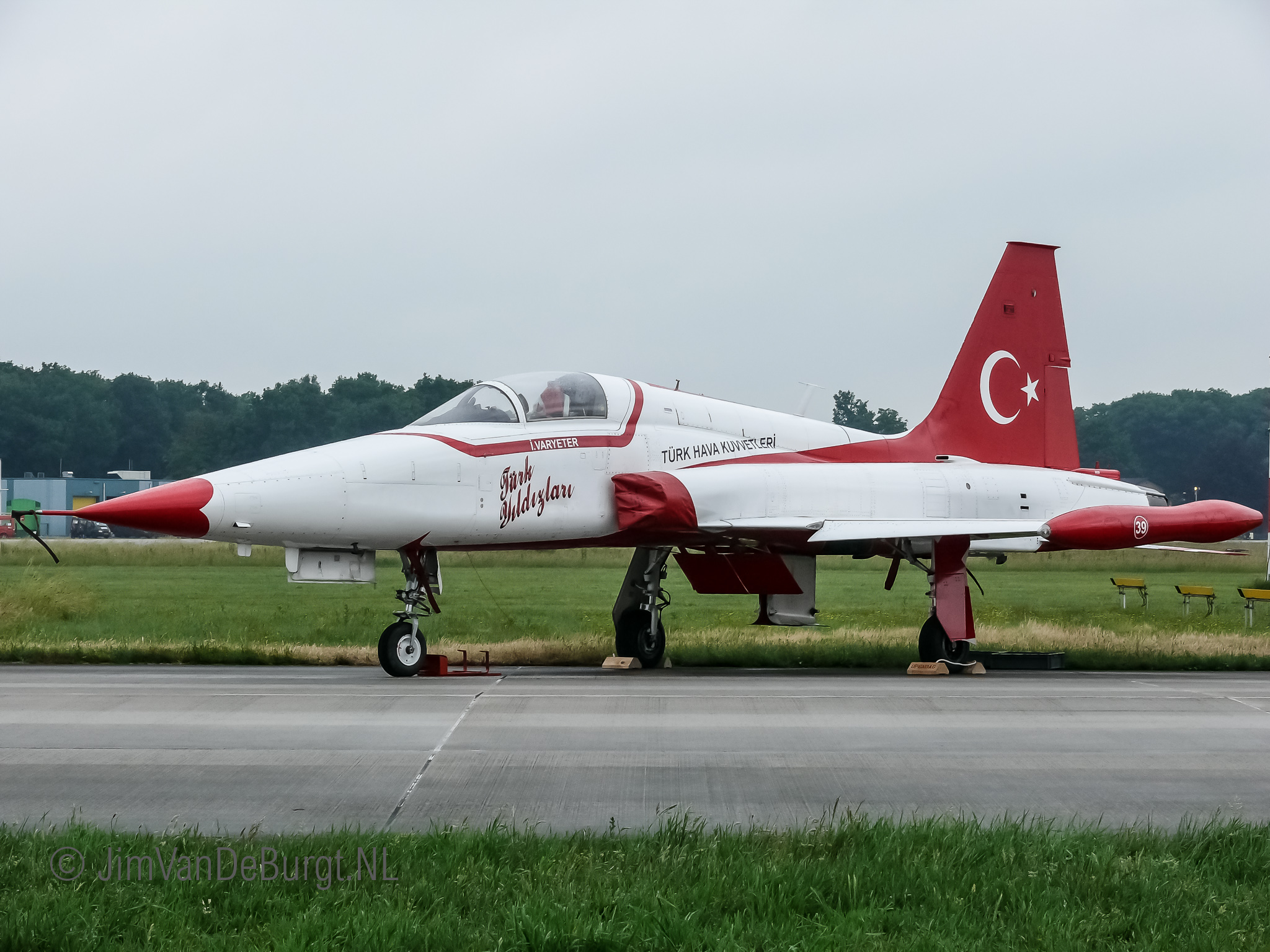
Turkish Stars F-5A

Turkey

- Turkish Air Force: More than 200 F-5A/Bs and NF-5A/Bs were bought from various countries. 48 of them were upgraded to F-5/2000 standard. They were withdrawn from the active service in 2013. Upgraded 10 F-5A-2000 and two F-5B-2000 remain active with the Turkish Stars aerobatic display team. The aircraft is planned to be replaced with TAI Hurjet.

United States

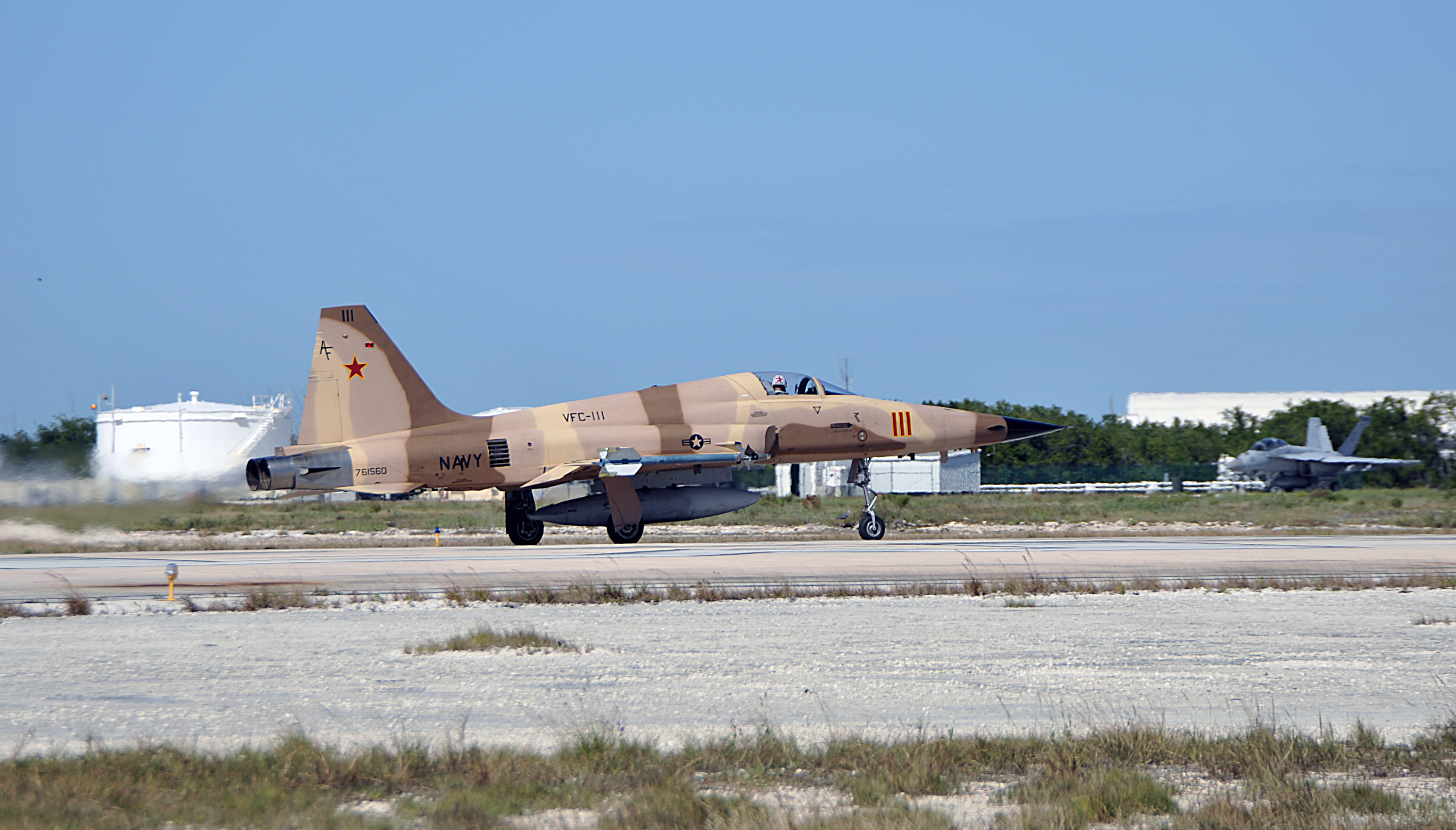
F-5N in service with US Navy aggressor squadron VFC-111

- United States Navy
  - VFC-111
  - VFC-204
- United States Marine Corps
  - VMFT-401
  - VMFT-402

Yemen

- Yemeni Air Force: inherited North Yemen's F-5 fleet in 1994. Only half a dozen F-5s were still operational as of the early 2010s. 11 F-5Es and 2 F-5B two seaters were operational in 2023.
- Houthis operate a single F-5 seized from the Yemeni government.

=== Former operators ===
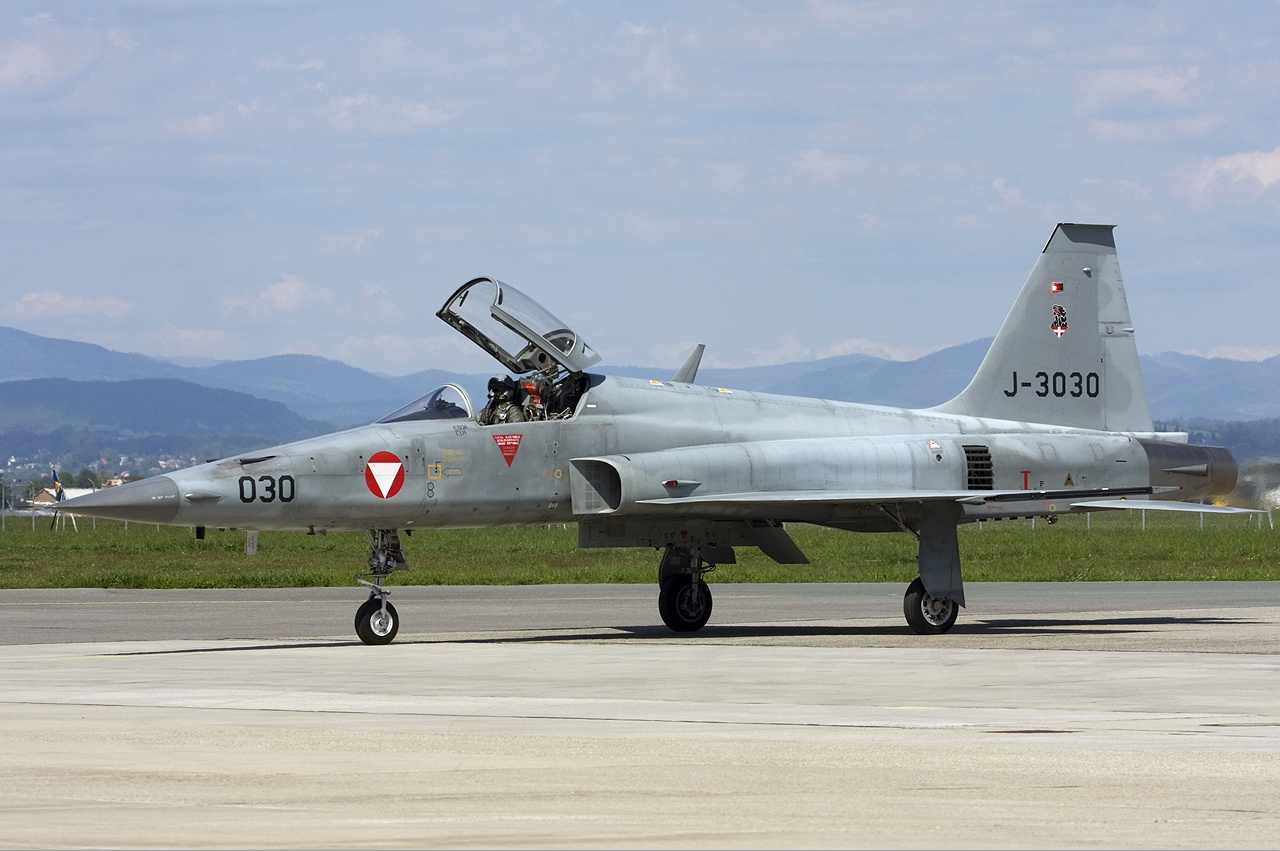
An Austrian Air Force F-5E Tiger II with Swiss registration.

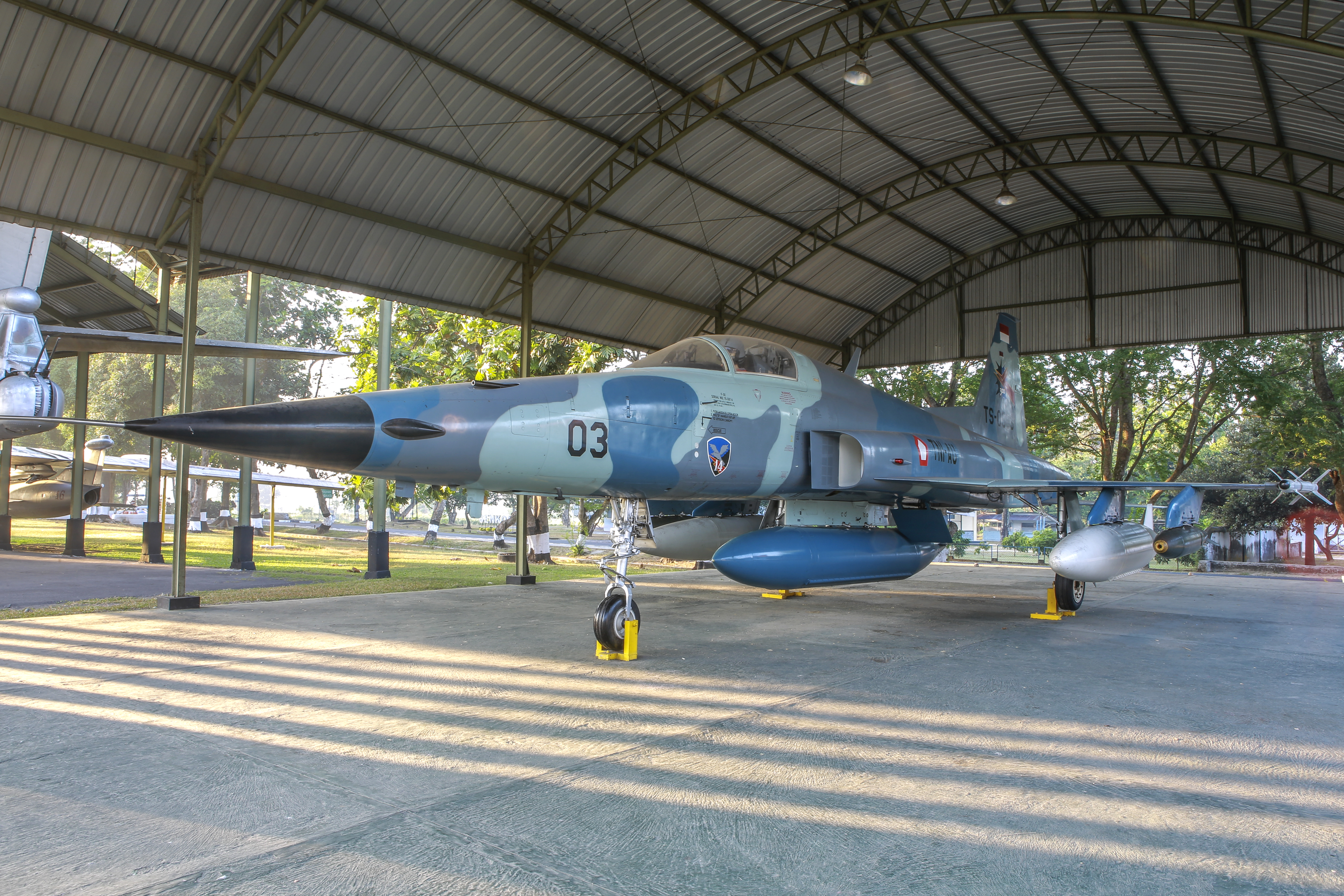
F-5E Tiger II of the Indonesian Air Force preserved at the Dirgantara Mandala Museum, Yogyakarta

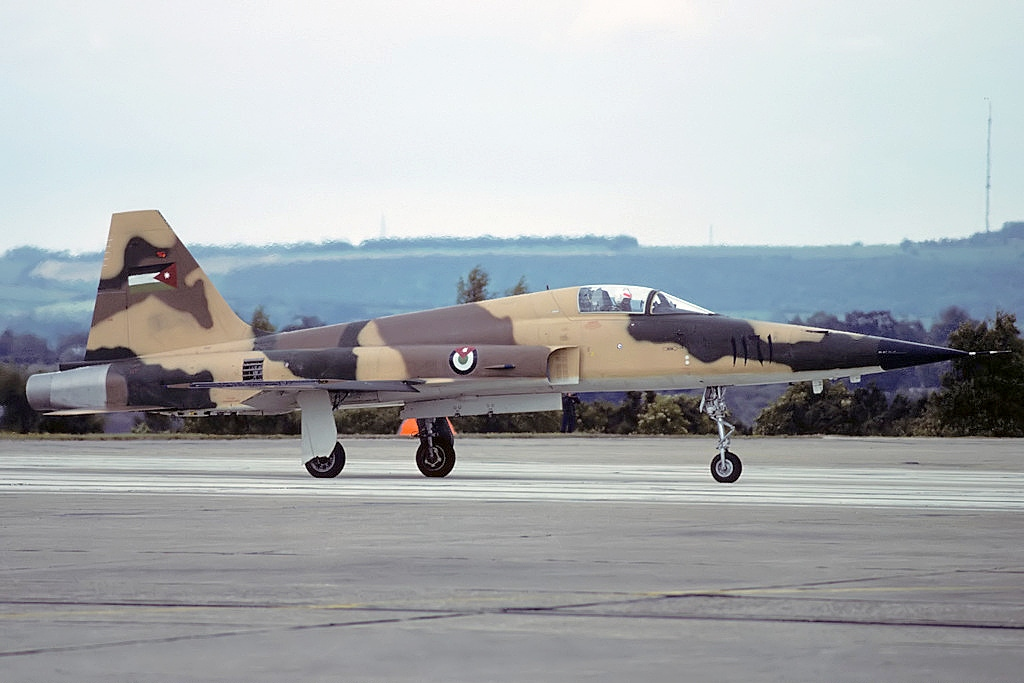
Jordanian F-5E Tiger II

Austria

- Austrian Air Force: On loan from Switzerland – all aircraft returned and replaced by Eurofighter Typhoons.

Canada

- Canadian Forces – see Canadair CF-5

Ethiopia

- Ethiopian Air Force first delivery in 1966; it has operated the A, B, and E variants.

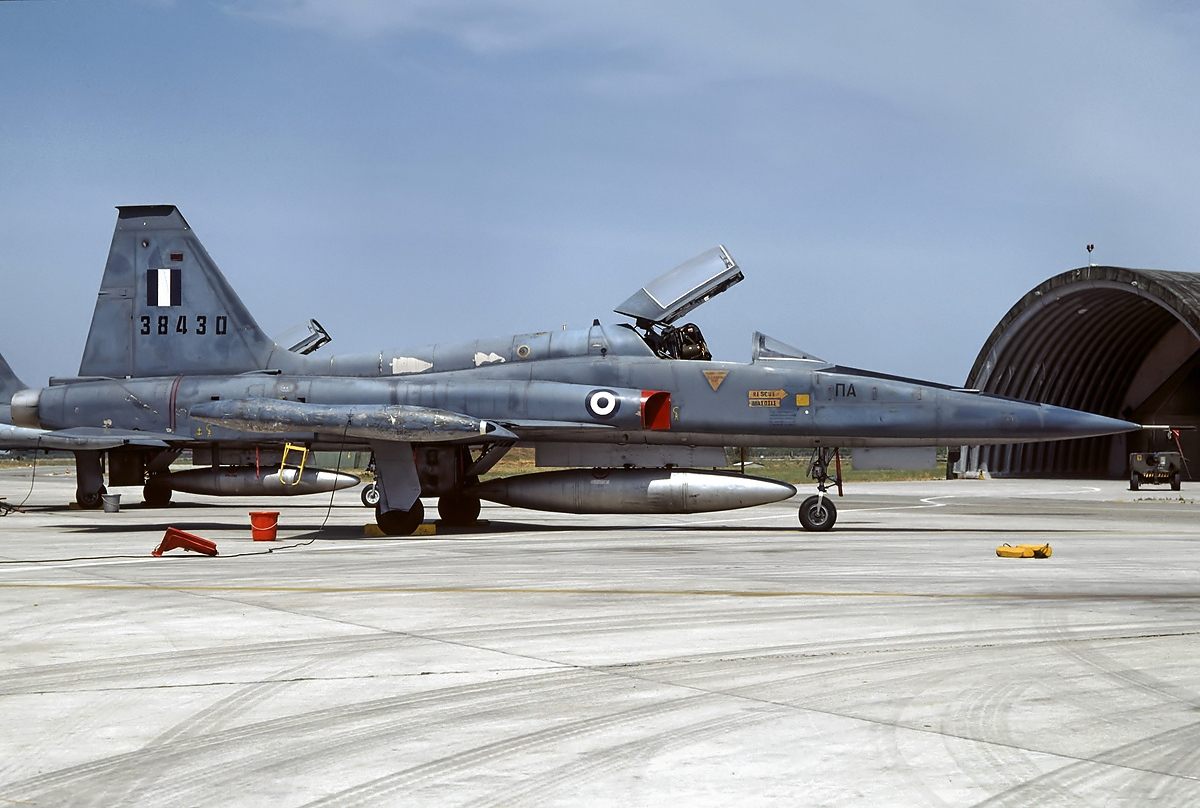
A Hellenic Air Force F-5A

Greece

- Hellenic Air Force received the first 55 F-5As in 1965. In 1975, 10 aircraft were bought from Iran and later, another 10 followed from Jordan. In 1986, nine aircraft were donated by Norway and in 1991, 10 NF-5As were donated by the Netherlands. During 1967 and 1968 this type of aircraft was used by the 3rd Hellenic Aerobatic Team "New Hellenic Flame". The last NF-5As were retired in 2002.

Indonesia

- Indonesian Air Force: Received in 1980, upgraded in Belgium in the middle to late 1990s. All 16 F-5E/Fs have been retired since 3 May 2016 per directive from Chief of Indonesian Air Force due to safety issues.

Jordan

- Royal Jordanian Air Force – retired in 2015. Replaced by F-16A/B and Hawk Mk 63. Sold 11 to Brazil for $21 million in 2009.

Kingdom of Libya

- Royal Libyan Air Force to 1969. 10 F-5s. May have been sold to Turkey after 1969.

Malaysia

- Royal Malaysian Air Force used 4 F-5F as trainer aircraft while another 16 of its Northrop F-5E Tiger IIs were upgraded for reconnaissance purposes.

Netherlands

- Royal Netherlands Air Force: received 75 Canadair-built NF-5A (single-seat fighter version) and 30 NF-5B (two-seat training version) between 7 October 1969 and 20 March 1972. After the aircraft were phased out and replaced by the F-16 Fighting Falcon, the aircraft were initially stored at Gilze-Rijen Air Base and Woensdrecht Air Base, until 60 aircraft were sold to Turkey, 11 to Greece and 7 to Venezuela. Several of the remaining aircraft can be found in aviation museums and technical schools.
  - No. 313 Squadron; Twenthe Air Base. Formed September 1972, transitioned to F-16 in 1987.
  - No. 314 Squadron; Eindhoven Air Base. Converted from F-84F from June 1970, and was fully equipped in November that year. The squadron transitioned to the F-16 in April 1990.
  - No. 315 Squadron, Operation Conversion Unit (OCU); Twenthe Air Base (transitioned to F-16 in 1986)
  - No. 316 Squadron; Gilze-Rijen Air Base (transitioned to F-16 in 1991)
  - Field Technic Training Unit NF-5 (1971–1984); Twenthe Air Base

North Yemen

- Yemen Arab Republic Air Force: four F-5B trainers were transferred from Saudi Arabia, and twelve F-5E fighters delivered from the United States (but also paid for by Saudi Arabia) in 1979. Several additional aircraft were later donated by the Saudis as attrition replacements. The surviving aircraft were passed on to the reunified Yemeni Air Force in 1994.

Norway

- Royal Norwegian Air Force: received a total of 108 F-5A, F-5B and RF-5A from 1966 to 1971.
  - No. 332 Squadron; Rygge Air Station.
  - No. 334 Squadron; Bodø Air Station. Transitioned to F-16 in 1982.
  - No. 336 Squadron; Rygge Air Station. Operated F-5 until 2000.
  - No. 338 Squadron; Ørland Air Station. Primary air-to-ground missions. Transitioned to F-16 in 1985.
  - No. 717 Squadron; Rygge Air Station. Reconnaissance squadron. Operated RF-5A until 1979.
  - No. 718 Squadron; Sola Air Station.

Philippines

- Philippine Air Force received 19 F-5A (single seat) and three F-5B (two seat) aircraft in 1965–1967. In 1989, the PAF received three ex-Taiwanese F-5A and one F-5B. In the 1990s, at least eight ex-South Korean F-5A and two Jordanian F-5A were acquired. The Philippines decommissioned its F-5A/B fleet in 2005.

Saudi Arabia

- Royal Saudi Air Force: From 1974 to 1985 received a total of 20 F-5Bs, 109 F-5E/Fs and 10 RF-5Es.

Singapore

- Republic of Singapore Air Force: operated 32 F-5S, 9 F-5T and 8 RF-5S fighters in 2011. Mostly retired by 2014 except a few left for training, before retiring all in 2015.

South Vietnam

- Republic of Vietnam Air Force received a fleet of 165 former US, South Korean, Iranian, and Taiwanese F-5A Freedom Fighters, 10 RF-5A and 15 F-5B trainers, USA also provided 54 F-5E Tiger 2s, 31 F-5 series were evacuated to Thailand in 1975, but many more were captured by People's Army. Also a lot had been sent back earlier to friendly Allies when the brand new F-5E Tiger 2 were used to replace them-at least 56 were returned and possibly more.9 went to Iran,34 to South Korea and 13 went to Taiwan.
  - 522nd Fighter Squadron, Bien Hoa AB, F-5A/B/C and RF-5A Freedom Fighter (coded HZ etc..)
  - 536th Fighter Squadron, Bien Hoa AB,later to Da Nang AB(1973) F-5A/B Freedom Fighter (coded HJ etc..)
  - 538th Fighter Squadron, Da Nang AB, F-5E Tiger 2(some F-5A were retained) (coded HQ etc..)
  - 540th Fighter Squadron, Bien Hoa AB, F-5A Freedom Fighter (coded FU etc..)
  - 542nd Fighter Squadron, Bien Hoa AB, F-5E Tiger 2(some F-5A were retained) (coded HB etc..)
  - 544th Fighter Squadron, Bien Hoa AB, F-5E Tiger 2 (some F-5A were retained) (coded HK etc..)
  - 716th Reconnaissance Squadron, Tan Son Nhut AB, RF-5A Freedom Fighter(flown by 522 Fighter Squadron crews)

Soviet Union

- F-5Es were received from Vietnam and the Derg regime in Ethiopia for performance tests and evaluation flights. They were tested in mock combat against MiG-21 and MiG-23 aircraft, ultimately aiding in the development of the MiG-23MLD and the MiG-29.

Sudan

- Sudanese Air Force: 10 F-5Es and two F-5F were delivered in 1978, One of the F-5Fs was sold to Jordan. Further, two F-5s defected to Sudan from Ethiopia during the Ogaden crisis.

Taiwan (Republic of China)

- Republic of China Air Force: Received 115 F-5A and B from 1965, 48 were transferred to South Vietnam before 1975. From 1973 to 1986, Taiwan produced 308 F-5E/Fs under license. Later batches of locally AIDC licensed production of Tiger IIs were fitted with flare/chaff dispensers, plus handling qualities upgrades with enlarged LEX and F-20's shark nose, and radar warning receivers (RWR). Seven of the F-5E were converted to RF-5E Tigergazer in 1996.

Turkey

- Turkish Air Force: More than 175 F-5A/Bs were retired.

United States

- United States Air Force
  - Continental United States–based units
    - 64th Aggressor Squadron (1976–1988) Nellis Air Force Base, Nevada
    - 65th Aggressor Squadron (1975–1989) Nellis Air Force Base, Nevada
    - 425th Tactical Fighter Training Squadron (1973–1989) Luke Air Force Base, Arizona
  - United States Air Forces Europe (USAFE)
    - 527th Aggressor Squadron (1976–1988) RAF Alconbury, England
  - Pacific Air Forces (PACAF)
    - 4503rd Tactical Fighter Squadron (October 1965 – April 1966) Bien Hoa AB and Da Nang AB, Republic of Vietnam
    - 10th Fighter Commando Squadron (April 1966 – June 1967)
    - 26th Aggressor Squadron (1977–1988) Clark Air Base, Philippines
- United States Navy
  - VFC-13
  - VF-43
  - VF-45
  - VF-126
  - VFA-127

Venezuela

- Venezuelan Air Force 27 aircraft acquired (16 CF-5As, 4 CF-5Ds, 1 NF-5A, 6 NF-5Bs), 9 lost to accidents. The last unit recorded to have flown did it in 2010. As of 2021, all F-5 fleet was retired, and its role is replaced by Hongdu K-8W.

Vietnam

- Vietnam People's Air Force (several captured ex-RVNAF aircraft). One F-5E (s/n 73-00867) was transferred to the Soviet Union for evaluation flights, i.e. against the MiG-21bis; 40+ F-5E/F/C were in VNAF's service. After the Vietnam War, Vietnamese forces used the captured F-5 fleet against Chinese forces during the Sino-Vietnamese War.

== Aircraft on display ==
=== Brazil ===
F-5B

- FAB4800 – Brazilian Air Force – Museu Aeroespacial (Musal), Rio de Janeiro
- FAB4805 – Brazilian Air Force – Santa Cruz Air Force Base, Rio de Janeiro

F-5E

- FAB4836 – Brazilian Air Force – Tenente Diomar Menezes Square, Jataí.
- FAB4874 – Brazilian Air Force – Nossa Senhora do Rosário Square, Carandaí.
- FAB4879 – Brazilian Air Force – CINDACTA II, Curitiba

=== Canada ===
See Canadair CF-5

=== Chile ===
F-5E

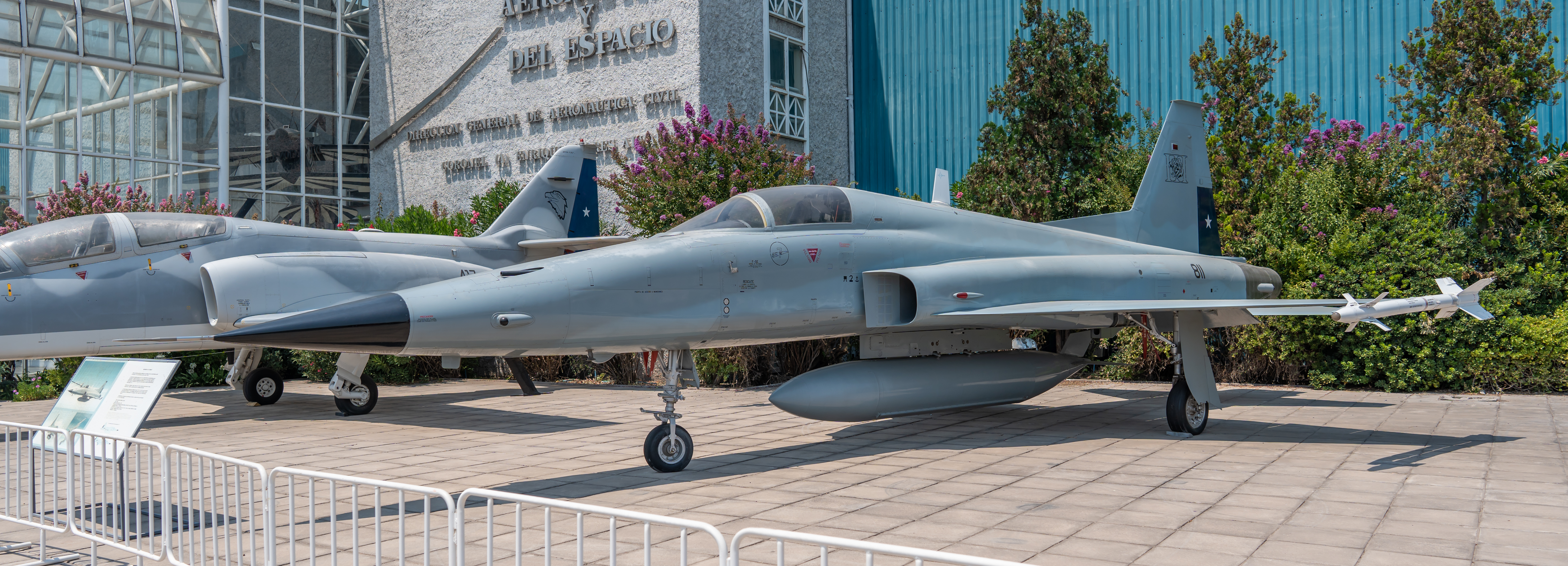
- F-5E Tiger II of the Chilean Air Force, preserved at Museo Nacional Aeronáutico y del Espacio.
  At Museo Nacional Aeronáutico y del Espacio

=== Czech Republic ===
F-5E

- 73-00878 (Vietnam People's Air Force) – Prague Aviation Museum, Kbely, Prague

=== Greece ===
F-5A

- 65-10541 – Hellenic Air Force Museum
- 68-9071 – Athens War Museum
- 69–132 – Hellenic Air Force Museum
- 13-353 – Thessaloniki War Museum
- 68-074 – Kalamata Military Museum

RF-5A

- 69-7170 – Hellenic Air Force Museum

=== Indonesia ===
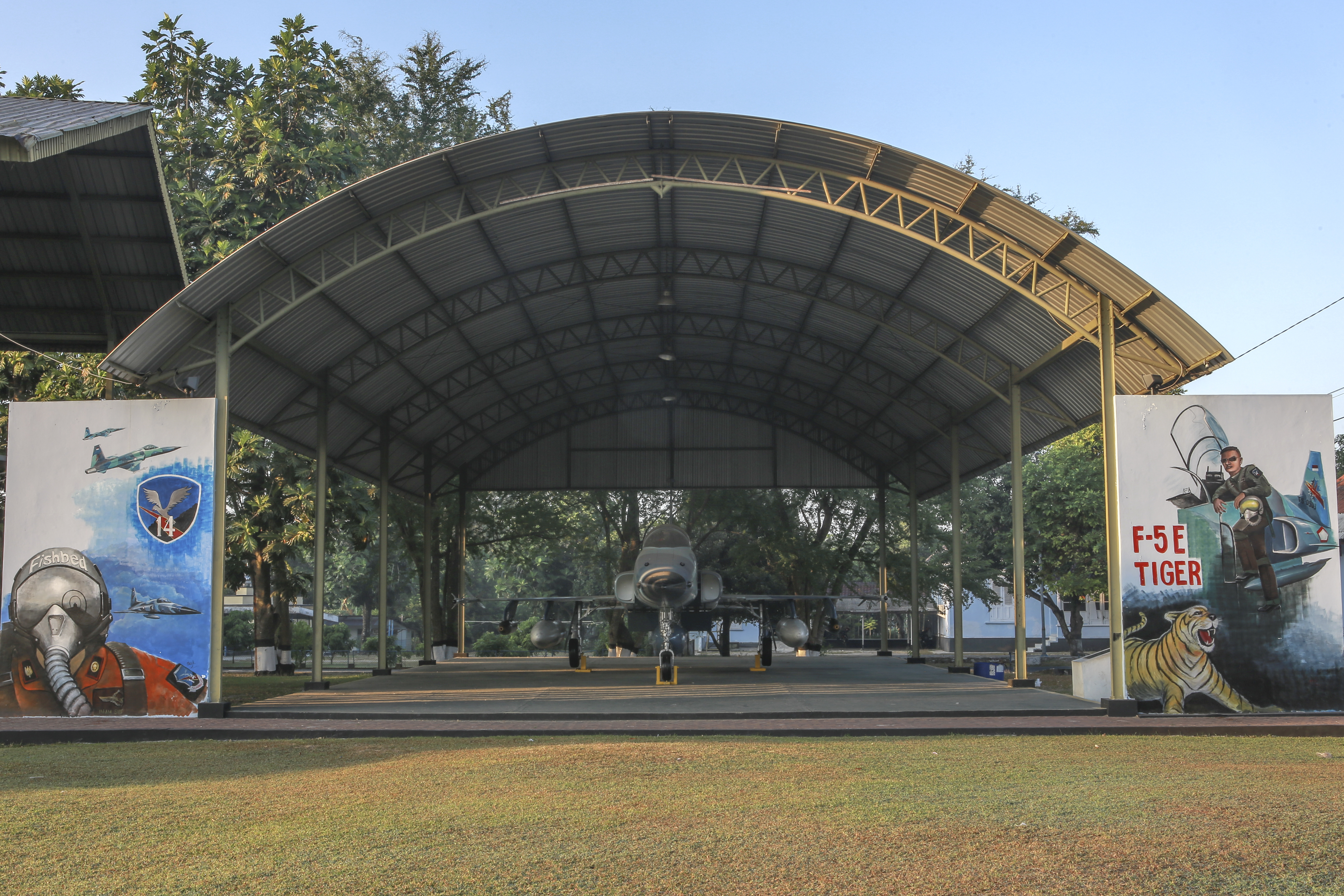
Indonesian Air Force F-5E Tiger II of the Skadron Udara 14 at Dirgantara Mandala Museum Yogyakarta

F-5E

- TS-0501 – Tri Matra Monument, Tanjungpinang, Riau Islands. Formerly at Adisutjipto Air Force Base
- TS-0502 – Ade Irma Suryani Nasution Traffic Park, Bandung, West Java
- TS-0503 – Dirgantara Mandala Museum, Sleman Regency, Special Region of Yogyakarta
- TS-0508 – Indonesian Air Force Academy, Sleman Regency, Special Region of Yogyakarta
- TS-0509 – As gate guardian at Iswahyudi Air Force Base, Magetan, East Java
- TS-0510 – In front of Indonesian National Air Defense Forces Command, Halim Perdanakusuma International Airport, East Jakarta, Jakarta
- TS-0511 – SMA Pradita Dirgantara high school, Boyolali Regency, Central Java
- TS-0512 – Indonesian Air Force Command and Staff College, West Bandung Regency, West Java

F-5F

- TS-0513 – Madiun Regency Plaza, Madiun Regency, East Java
- TS-0515 – Third Air Force Operations Command Headquarters, Biak Numfor Regency, Papua

=== Iran ===
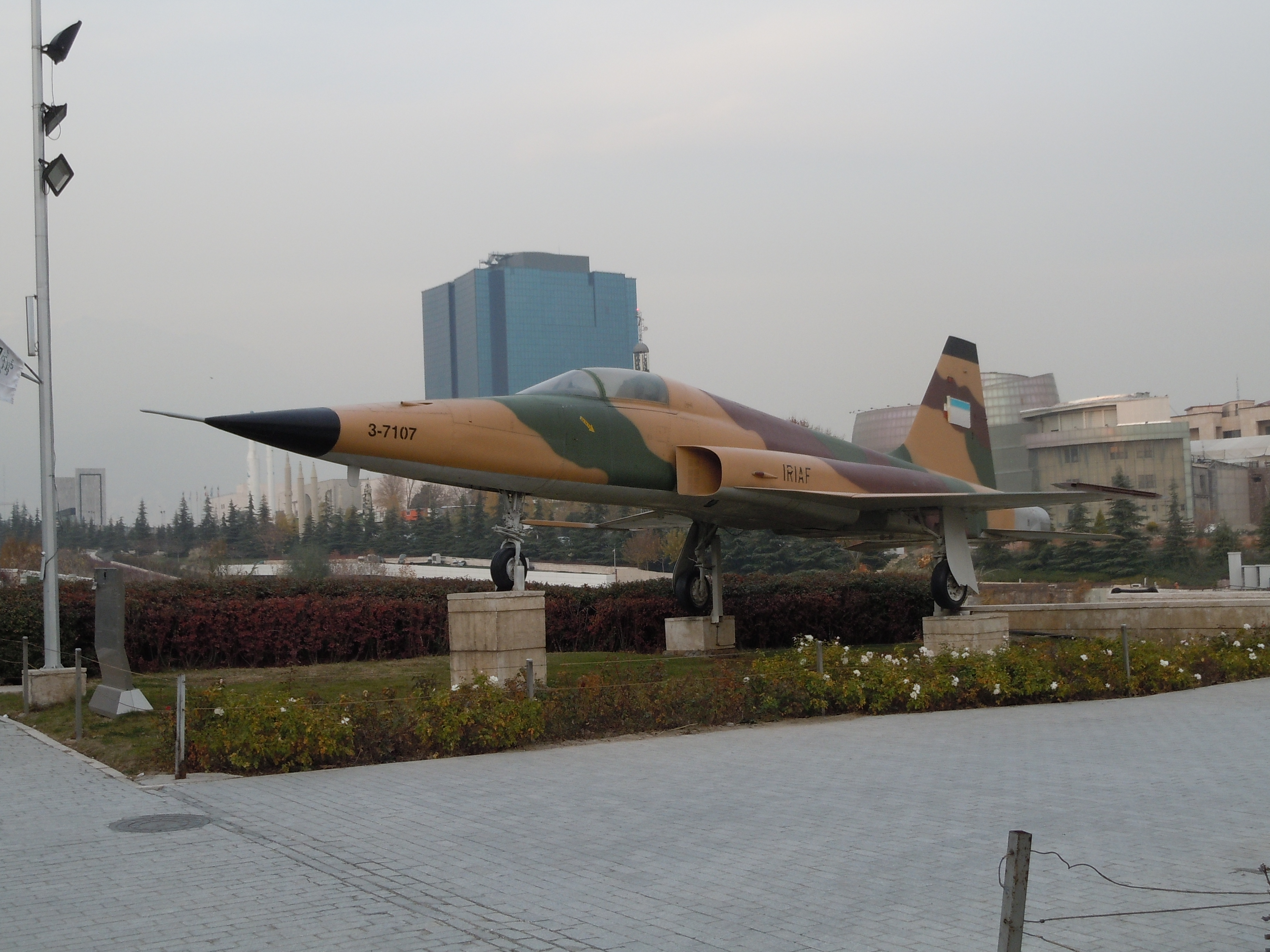
F-5E "3-7107" on static display Tehran, Iran

F-5E

- 3-7107 – Museum of the Islamic Revolution and the Holy Defense

=== Mexico ===
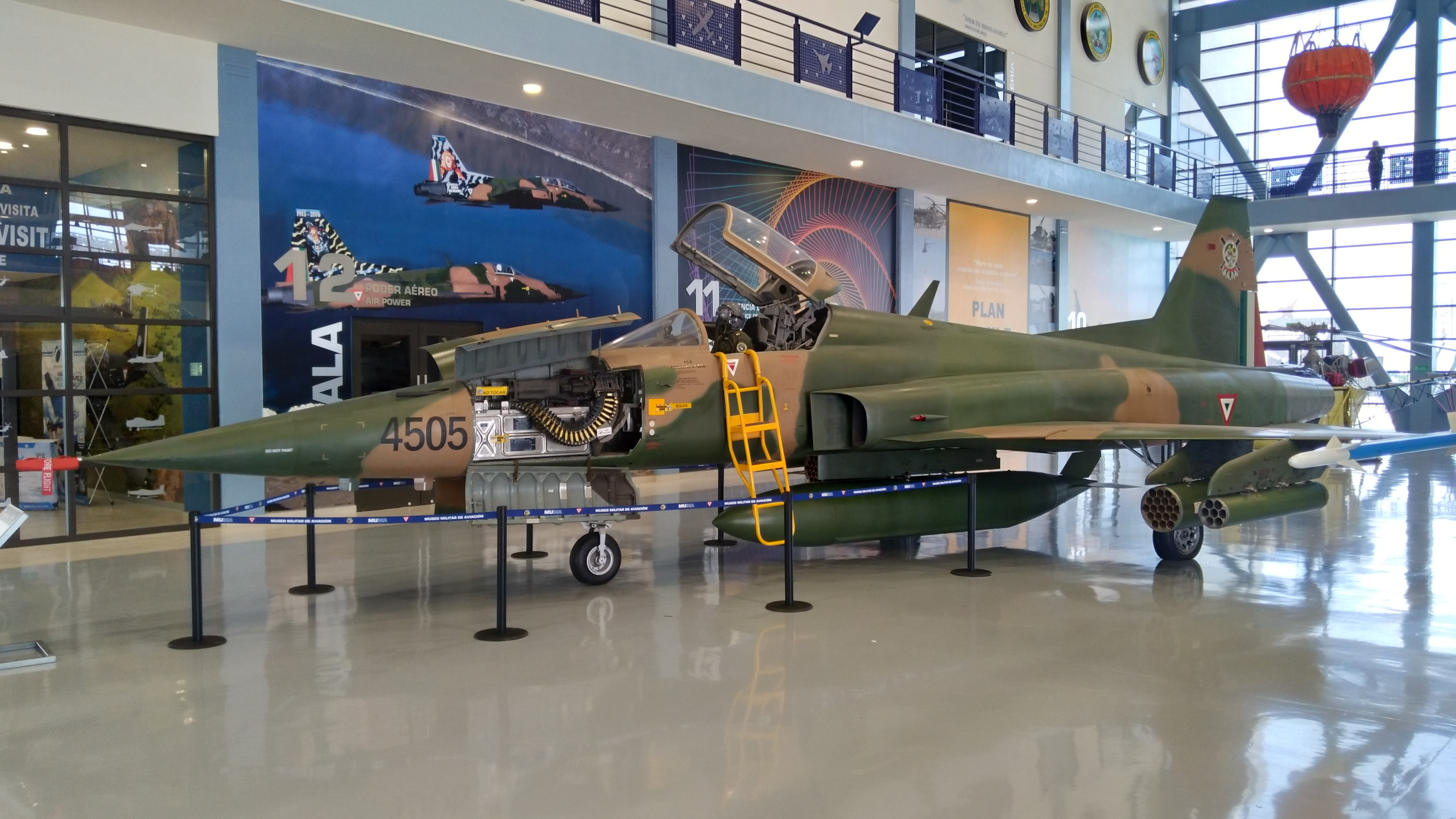
F-5E Tiger II of the Mexican Air Force preserved at the Mexican Air Force Museum.

F-5E

- FAM-4505 – Mexican Air Force Museum

=== Norway ===
F-5A

- 66-9207 – Western Museum of Flight
- 68-9102 – Norwegian Aviation Museum
- 69-7134 – Norwegian Aviation Museum
- AH-M – Sola Aviation Museum
- 594 – Norwegian Armed Forces Aircraft Collection

=== Philippines ===
F-5A

- 63-8389 – Air Power Park, Philippine Military Academy, Baguio City. Ex-RoKAF
- 64-13326 – Philippine Air Force Museum, Pasay
- 65-10499/FA-499 – Basa Air Base, Pampanga
- 65-10507 – Clark Air Base, Pampanga
- 66-9143 – Tagaytay City, Cavite
- 67-21190 – Clark Air Base, Pampanga. Ex-RoKAF
- 67-21177 – Philippine Marine Corps Camp Cape Bojeador, Burgos, Ilocos Norte

F-5B

- 74-0780 – Clark Air Base, Pampanga. Ex-RoCAF "1117"

=== Poland ===
F-5E

- 73-00852 (R1033) (Republic of Vietnam Air Force) – Polish Aviation Museum, Kraków

=== Saudi Arabia ===
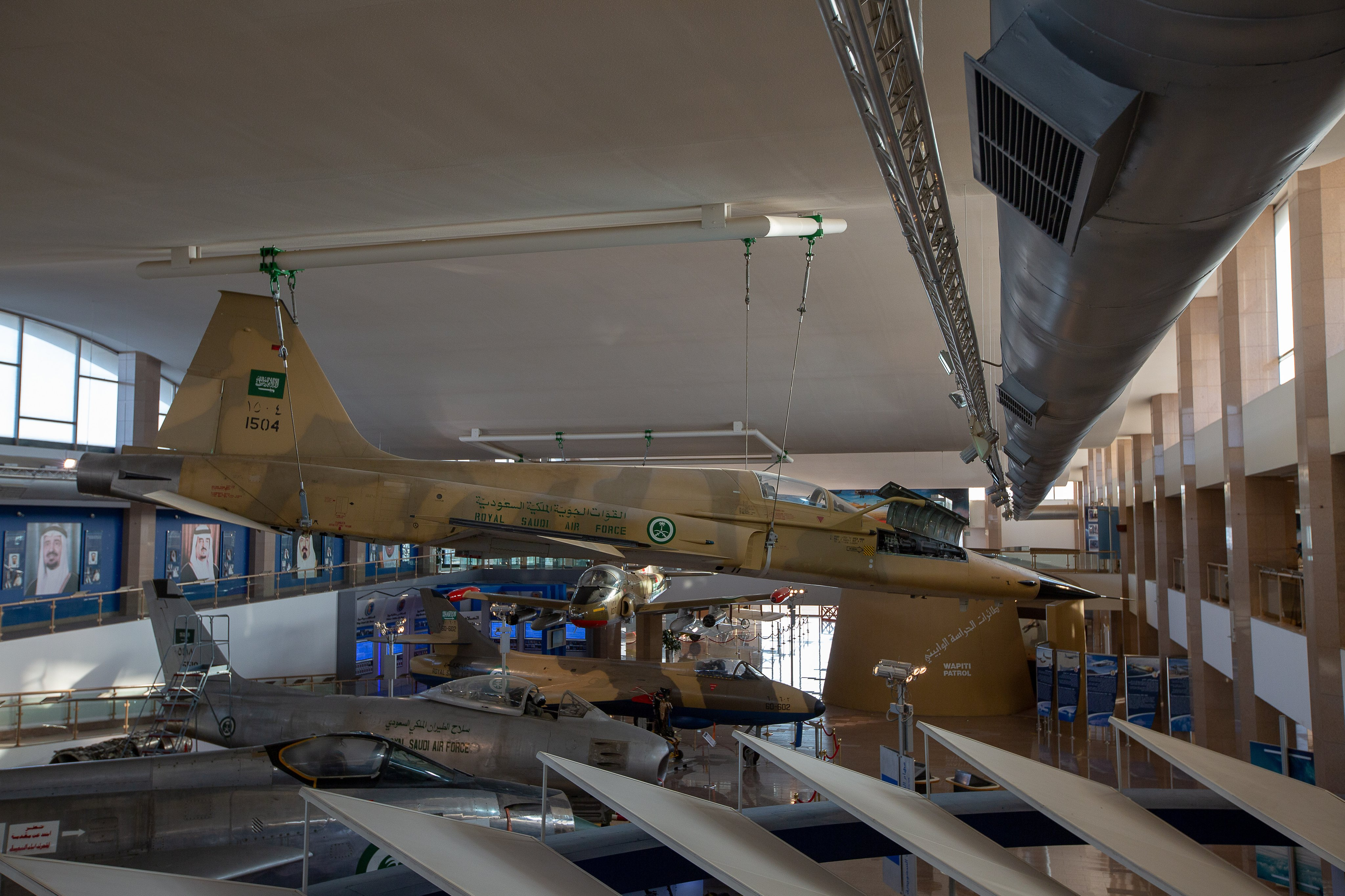
F-5E in the Royal Saudi Air Force Museum

F-5E

• F-5E Tiger II at Royal Saudi Air Force Museum

=== Singapore ===
F-5S

- 800 at Singapore Air Force Museum

=== Spain ===
F-5A

- A9-050 — Museum of Aeronautics and Astronautics, Cuatro Vientos, Madrid

SRF-5A

- AR9-062 — Museum of Aeronautics and Astronautics, Cuatro Vientos, Madrid

F-5BM

- AR9-053 – Elder Museum of Science and Technology, Gran Canaria

=== Switzerland ===
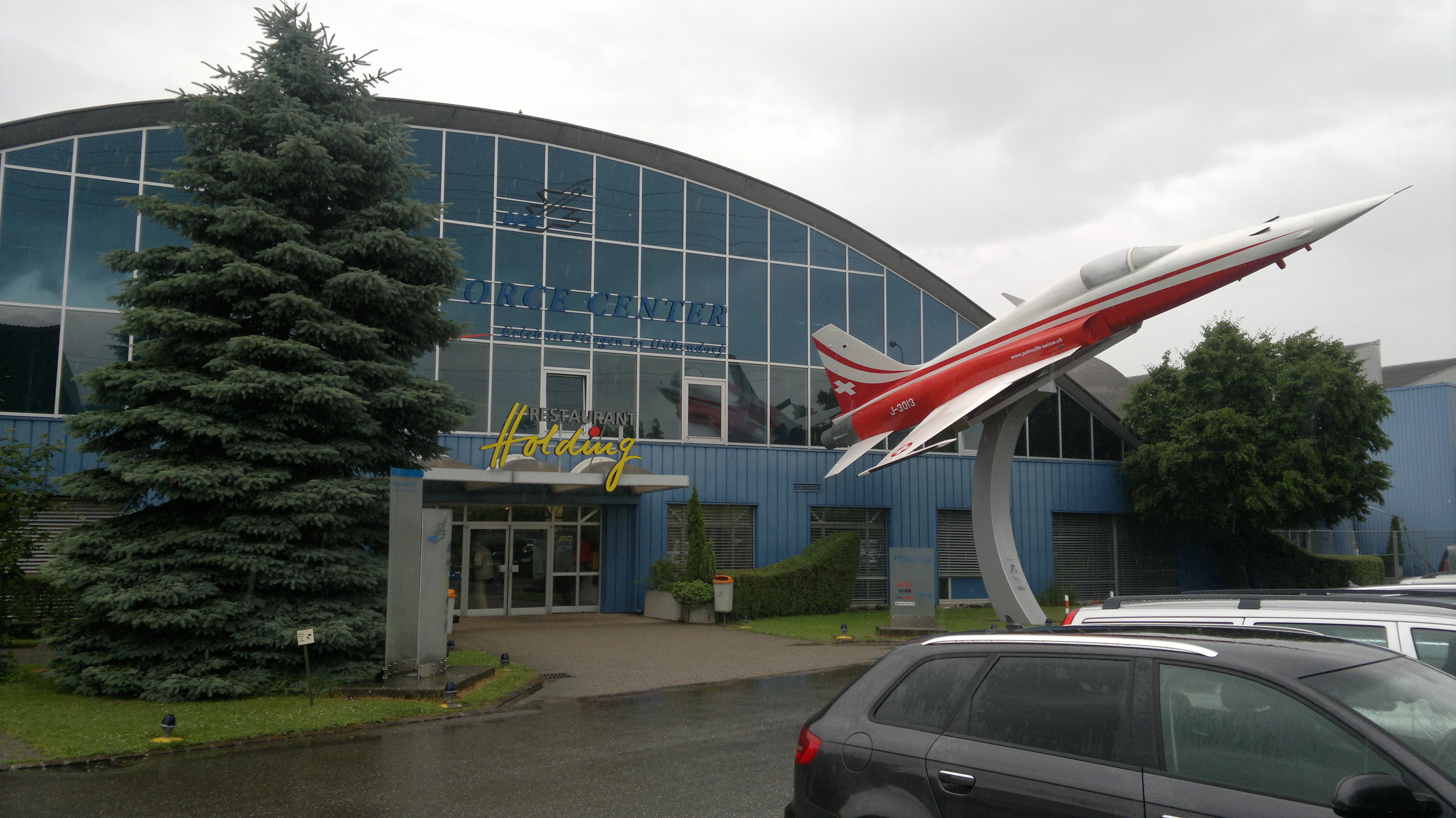
J-3096 outside Flieger Flab Museum, in Patrouille Suisse paint

F-5E

- J-3096 Gate Guard as "J-3013" in Patrouille Suisse paint at the Flieger-Flab-Museum
- J-3098 at the Flieger-Flab-Museum
- J-3099 Gate Guard as "J-3008" at Meiringen Air Base

F-5F

- J-3202 at the Flieger-Flab-Museum

=== Thailand ===
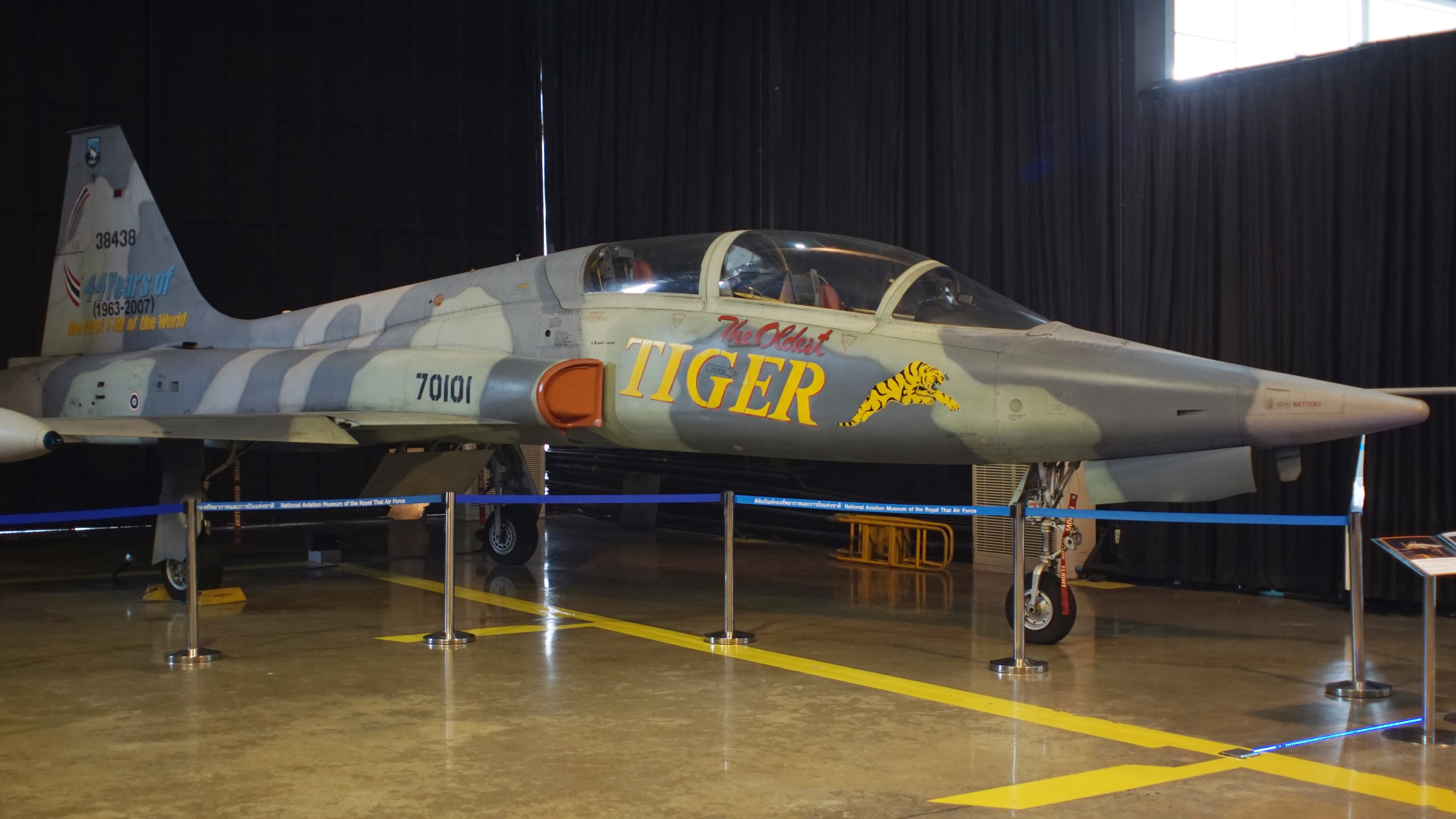
F-5B in Royal Thai Air Force Museum, the first F-5B produced

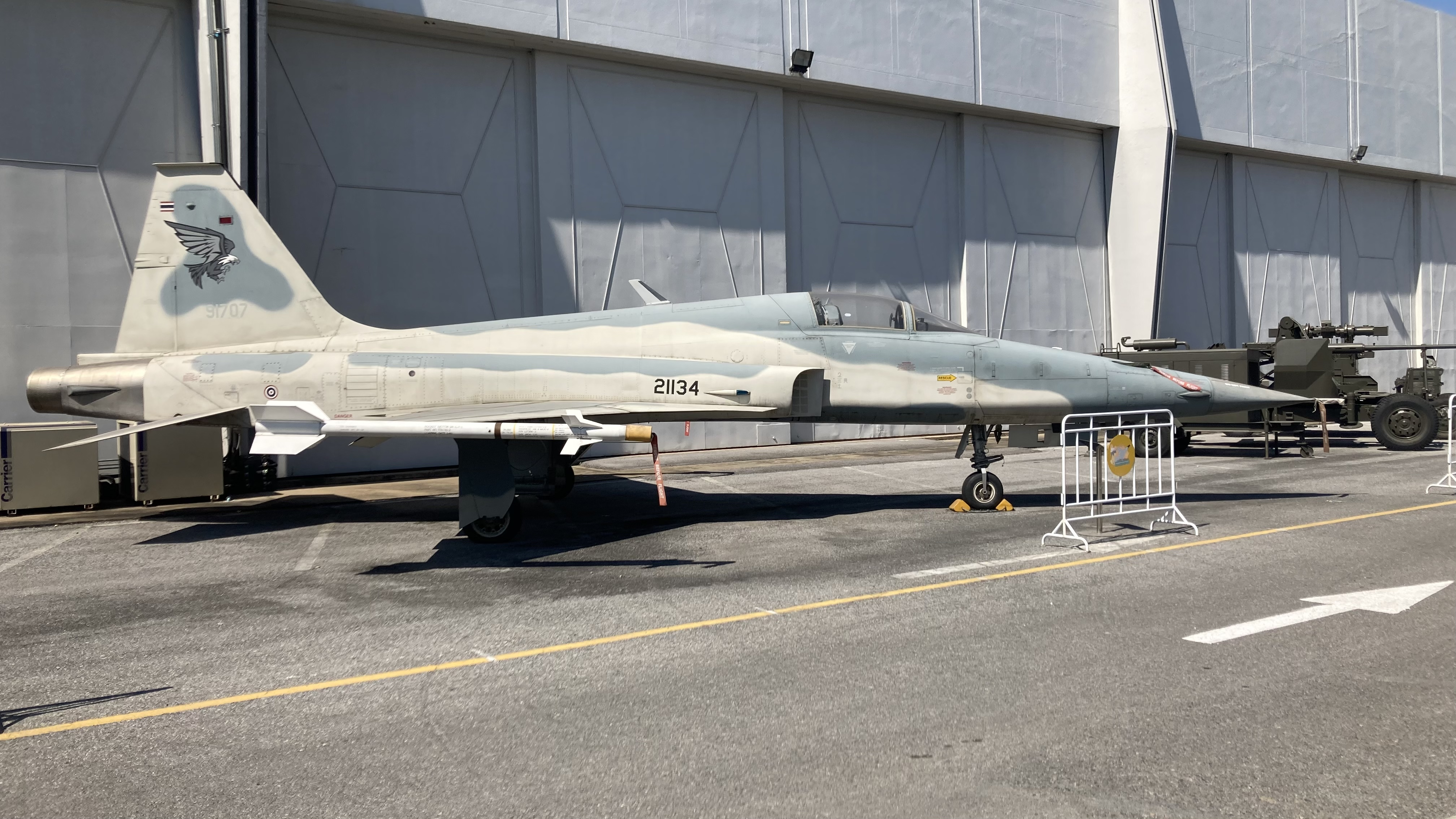
RTAF F-5E at Royal Thai Air Force Museum

=== Turkey ===
F-5A

- 14460 – Istanbul Aviation Museum

NF-5A

- 3022/22 – Istanbul Aviation Museum
- 3070/3-070 – Istanbul Aviation Museum

RF-5A

- 97147/5-147 – Istanbul Aviation Museum

=== United States ===
YF-5A

- 59-4987 – Museum of Flight at Boeing Field in Seattle, Washington
- 59-4989 – National Museum of the United States Air Force at Wright-Patterson AFB near Dayton, Ohio

F-5A

- 66-9207 – Western Museum of Flight in Torrance, California

F-5B

- 63-8447 – Phillip and Patricia Frost Museum of Science, Miami, Florida. Formerly on display at Octave Chanute Aerospace Museum at the former Chanute AFB, Rantoul, Illinois. Displayed completely covered in chrome.
- 72-0441 – Pima Air and Space Museum, adjacent to Davis-Monthan AFB in Tucson, Arizona

F-5E

- 72-1387 – Pacific Coast Air Museum, Santa Rosa, California
- 73-01640 Hill Aerospace Museum, Ogden, Utah
- 74-1556, Evergreen Aviation & Space Museum in McMinnville, Oregon; on loan from the National Museum of Naval Aviation. Carries the colors of a United States Air Force aggressor.
- 74-1558, later US Navy 741558 – Fort Worth Aviation Museum, Fort Worth, Texas
- 74-1564, later US Navy/US Marine Corps 741564 – Flying Leatherneck Aviation Museum at MCAS Miramar in San Diego, California
- 74-1571 – Nellis Air Force Base, Las Vegas, Nevada. Carries the markings of the 57th Fighter Weapons Wing, with Bort Code 65.
- 74-1572 – Naval Air Station Wildwood Aviation Museum, Cape May, New Jersey. On loan from the National Museum of Navy.
- 141540 – Marine F-5E Aggressor, at Hickory Aviation Museum

=== Vietnam ===
F-5A

- 66-9170 – War Remnants Museum, Ho Chi Minh City, Vietnam
- 66-10271 – Museum of Ho Chi Minh City, Ho Chi Minh City, Vietnam
- 71-0266 – Vietnam Military History Museum, Hanoi, Vietnam

F-5E

- 73-01638 – Independence Palace, Ho Chi Minh City, Vietnam

== Specifications (F-5E Tiger II) ==
3-view drawing of F-5E Tiger II

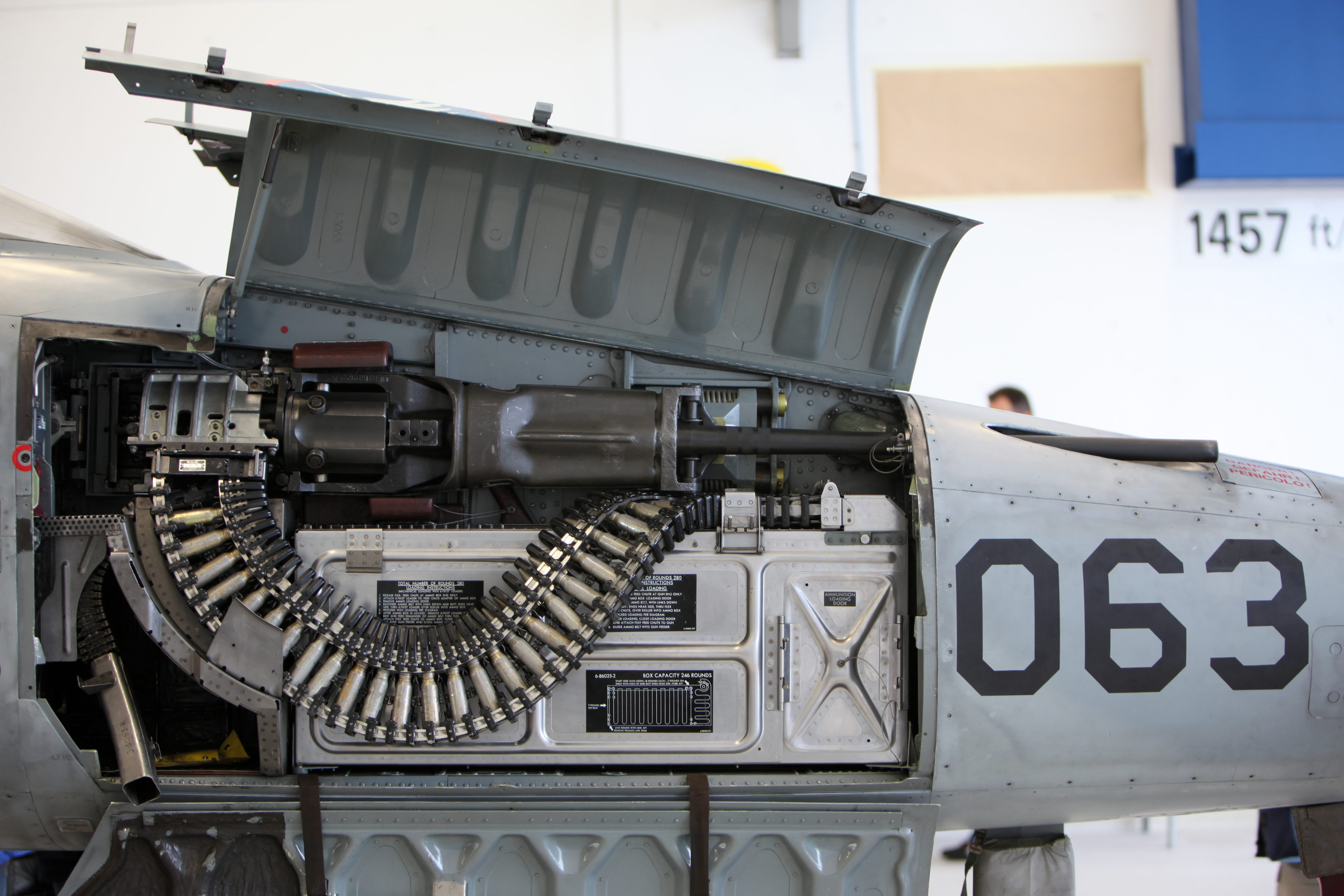
M39A2 cannon in the right side of the nose of an F-5E

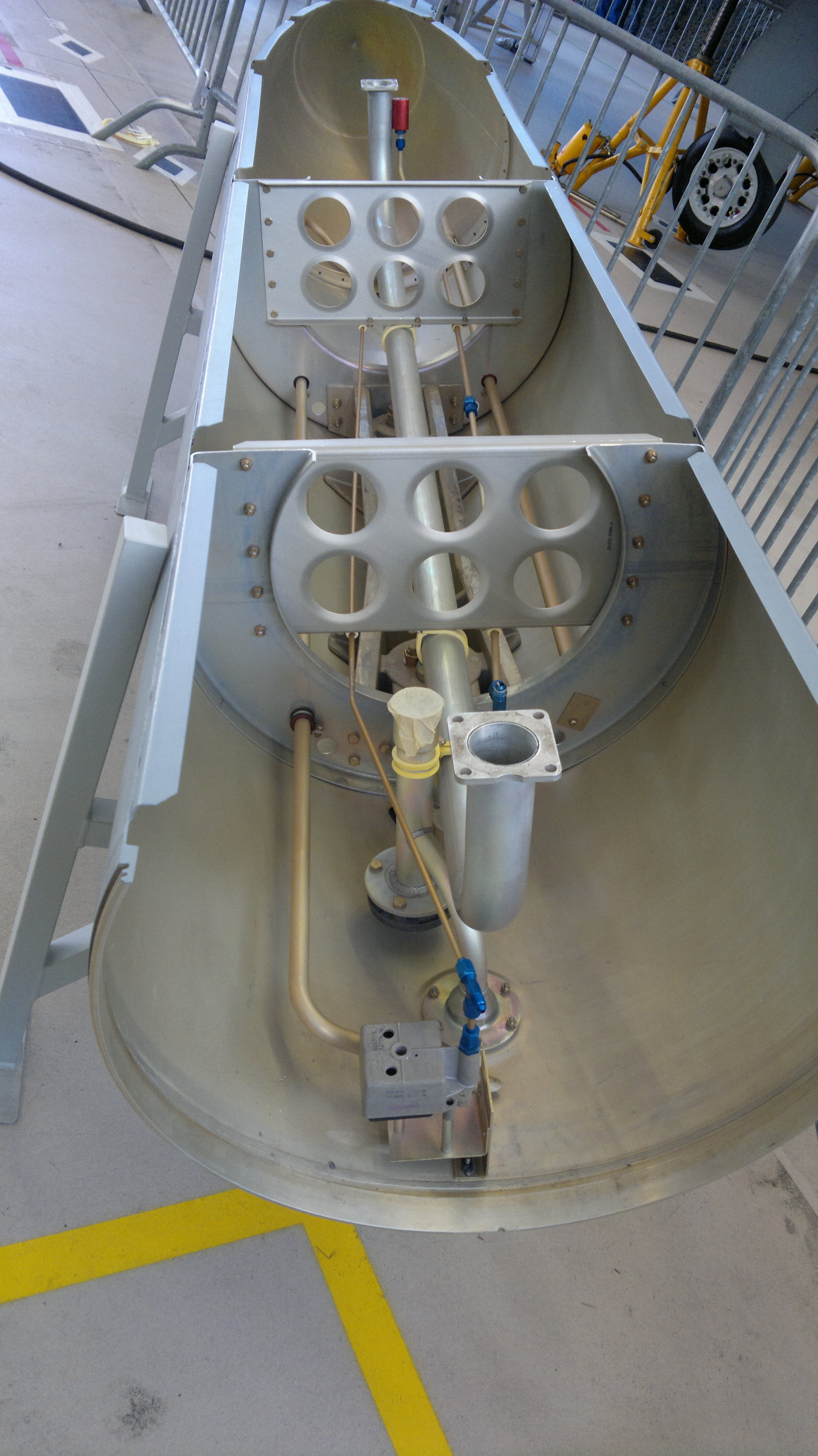
F-5 external fuel tank cutview

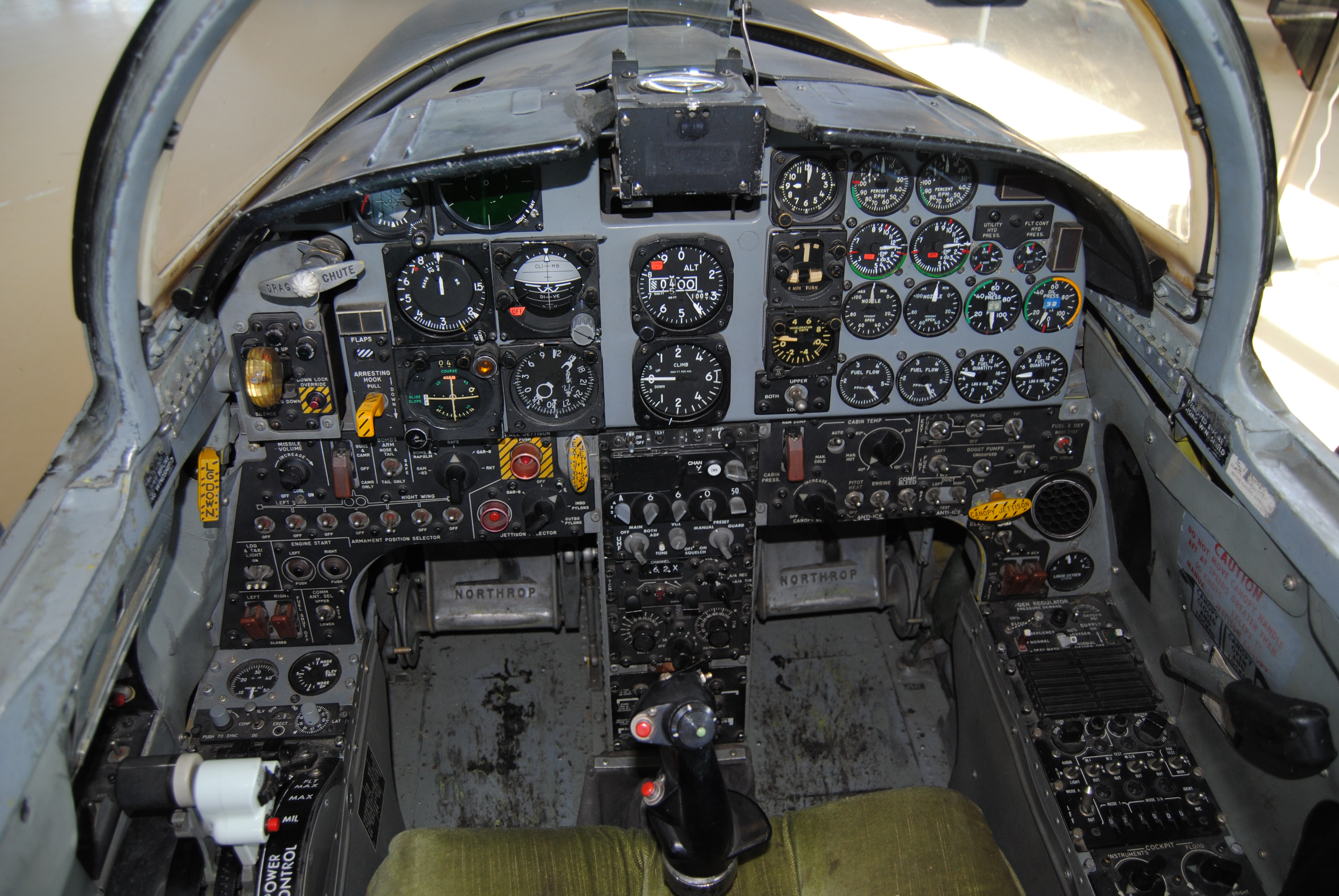
Cockpit of a Norwegian F-5A

Data from Jane's all the World's Aircraft 1976–77, The Complete Book of Fighters, Quest for Performance

General characteristics

- Crew: 1
- Length: 48 ft 2.25 in (14.6876 m)
- Wingspan: 26 ft 8 in (8.13 m)

27 ft 11.875 in (8.53123 m) with wing-tip missiles

- Height: 13 ft 4.5 in (4.077 m)
- Wing area: 186 sq ft (17.3 m^{2})
- Aspect ratio: 3.86
- Airfoil: NACA 65A004.8
- Empty weight: 9,583 lb (4,347 kg)
- Gross weight: 15,745 lb (7,142 kg) clean
- Max takeoff weight: 24,675 lb (11,192 kg)
- Fuel capacity:

- Internal fuel: 677 US gal (564 imp gal; 2,560 L)
- External fuel: up to 3x 275 US gal (229 imp gal; 1,040 L) drop-tanks

- Lift-to-drag ratio: 10.0
- Zero-lift drag coefficient: C_{D}0.0200
- Frontal area: 3.4 sq ft (0.32 m^{2})
- Powerplant: 2 × General Electric J85-GE-21 afterburning turbojet engines, 3,500 lbf (16 kN) thrust each dry, 5,000 lbf (22 kN) with afterburner

Performance

- Maximum speed: Mach 1.63 (1,739 km/h; 1,080 mph) at 36,000 ft (11,000 m)
- Maximum cruise speed: Mach 0.98 (1,050 km/h; 650 mph) at 36,000 ft (11,000 m)
- Economical cruise speed: Mach 0.8 (850 km/h; 530 mph) at 36,000 ft (11,000 m)
- Stall speed: 124 kn (143 mph, 230 km/h) 50% internal fuel, flaps and wheels extended
- Never exceed speed: 710 kn (820 mph, 1,310 km/h) IAS
- Range: 481 nmi (554 mi, 891 km) clean
- Combat radius (20 min reserve): 120 nmi (140 mi; 220 km) with 2x Sidewinders + 5,200 lb (2,400 kg) ordnance, with 5 minutes combat at max power at sea level
- Ferry range: 2,010 nmi (2,310 mi, 3,720 km)
- Ferry range (20 min reserve): 1,385 nmi (1,594 mi; 2,565 km) drop tanks retained
- Ferry range (20 min reserve): 1,590 nmi (1,830 mi; 2,940 km) drop tanks jettisoned
- Service ceiling: 51,800 ft (15,800 m)
- Service ceiling one engine out: 41,000 ft (12,000 m)
- Rate of climb: 34,500 ft/min (175 m/s)
- Lift-to-drag: 10:1
- Wing loading: 133 lb/sq ft (650 kg/m^{2}) maximum
- Thrust/weight: 0.4 for take-off thrust at maximum take-off weight
- Take-off run: 2,000 ft (610 m) with two Sidewinders at 15,745 lb (7,142 kg)
- Take-off run to 50 ft (15 m): 2,900 ft (884 m) with two Sidewinders at 15,745 lb (7,142 kg)
- Landing run from 50 ft (15 m): 3,701 ft (1,128 m) without brake-chute
- Landing run from 50 ft (15 m): 2,500 ft (762 m) with brake-chute

Armament

- Guns: 2× 20 mm (0.787 in) M39A2 Revolver cannon in the nose, 280 rounds/gun
- Hardpoints: 7 total (only pylon stations 3, 4 and 5 are wet-plumbed): 2× wing-tip AAM launch rails, 4× under-wing & 1× under-fuselage pylon stations with a capacity of 7,000 pounds (3,200 kg), with provisions to carry combinations of:
  - Rockets:
    - 2× LAU-61/LAU-68 rocket pods (each with 19× /7× Hydra 70 mm rockets, respectively); or
    - 2× LAU-5003 rocket pods (each with 19× CRV7 70 mm rockets); or
    - 2× LAU-10 rocket pods (each with 4× Zuni 127 mm rockets); or
    - 2× Matra rocket pods (each with 18× SNEB 68 mm rockets)
  - Missiles:
    - 2× AIM-9 Sidewinder air-to-air missile on wingtips (initial F-5E Tiger II loadout)
    - 4× AIM-9 Sidewinder or 4× AIM-120 AMRAAM air-to-air missile (F-5S and modernized F-5E)
    - 4× AGM-65 Maverick air-to-surface missiles (on upgraded F-5 after 1995)
    - R-60, R-27, R-73 and other Russian/Chinese AAMs (Iranian ver.)
  - Bombs: A variety of air-to-ground ordnance such as the Mark 80 series of unguided bombs (including 3 kg and 14 kg practice bombs), CBU-24/49/52/58 cluster bomb munitions, napalm bomb canisters and M129 Leaflet bomb, and laser-guided bombs of Paveway family.
  - Other:
    - up to 3× 150 / 275 US gallons (570 / 1,040 L; 125 / 229 imp gal) Sargent Fletcher drop tanks for ferry flight or extended range/loitering time.
    - 1× GPU-5/A 30mm cannon pods on the centreline station (fitted only on Thai F-5s)

Avionics

- Emerson Electric AN/APQ-153 radar on early batch of F-5E
- Emerson Electric AN/APQ-159 radar on later production F-5E
- Emerson Electric AN/APQ-157 radar on F-5F
- Emerson Electric AN/APG-69 radar on US Navy F-5N (ex-Swiss Air Force F-5E) aggressors role
- Leonardo Grifo-F radar on Singaporean Air Force upgraded F-5E

== See also ==
- Grumman X-29

Related development

- Northrop T-38 Talon
- Canadair CF-5
- HESA Azarakhsh
- HESA Saeqeh
- HESA Kowsar
- Northrop F-20 Tigershark
- Northrop YF-17
- Shaped Sonic Boom Demonstration

Aircraft of comparable role, configuration, and era

- Aeritalia G.91
- Dassault Mirage F1
- Helwan HA-300
- Mikoyan-Gurevich MiG-21

Related lists

- List of military aircraft of the United States
- List of fighter aircraft
- List of military electronics of the United States
