= AN/APG-69 =

US military aircraft fire-control radar

Emerson Electric Company's AN/APG-69 is an X band coherent pulse doppler radar originally designed for the F-20 Tigershark aircraft. It is the successor to the AN/APQ-159. Northrop Corporation skipped over the APG-69 for the F-20, choosing the General Electric AN/APG-67 instead. The APG-69 was still used by other Northrop F-5 operators, and other light fighter projects, including the Swiss Air Force ALR Piranha aircraft.

The APG-69 offered a complete suite of air-to-air and air-to-ground modes. The air-to-air modes included velocity search for long-range wide-angle searches, track-while-scan, single target track and dogfight modes that automatically locked onto the closest target. The APG-69 was capable of guiding the AIM-7 Sparrow missile, making it the first of Emerson's offerings to reach production with beyond visual range capabilities. The air-to-ground modes included moving target search and track, and sea-surface-search modes.

In accordance with the Joint Electronics Type Designation System (JETDS), the "AN/APG-69" designation represents the 69th design of an Army-Navy airborne electronic device for radar fire-control equipment. The JETDS system also now is used to name all Department of Defense electronic systems.

== See also ==
- List of radars
- List of military electronics of the United States
