= AN/APG-67 =

Military aircraft multimode radar system

- Country of origin: United States
- Introduced: 1979
- Type: Solid-state pulse-Doppler multi-mode radar
- Frequency: X band
- Range: 80 nautical miles (92 miles; 150 kilometres)
- Power: 396 W

The AN/APG-67 is a multi-mode all-digital X band coherent pulse doppler radar originally developed by General Electric for the Northrop F-20 Tigershark program of the early 1980s. It offers a variety of air-to-air, air-to-ground, sea-search and mapping modes, and compatibility with most weapons used by the US Air Force in the 1980s.

When the F-20 project ended in the mid-1980s and no other U.S. sales were immediately forthcoming, GE sold off its radar division. It eventually became part of Lockheed Martin, which sells the APG-67 for use on light fighters and trainer aircraft. It has been selected for the AIDC F-CK-1 Ching-kuo of Taiwan, and the Korean FA-50 fighter variant of the T-50 Golden Eagle.

In accordance with the Joint Electronics Type Designation System (JETDS), the "AN/APG-67" designation represents the 67th design of an Army-Navy airborne electronic device for radar fire-control equipment. The JETDS system also now is used to name all Department of Defense electronic systems.

== Description ==
The APG-67 is a modern radar featuring a planar phased array antenna and simplified electronics housed in three line-replaceable units, one of these being the radar "dish" itself. The entire system weighs less than 160 pounds (73 kg) and takes up less than 1.9 cubic feet (0.054 m^{3}). All communications with the cockpit is handled using the MIL-STD-1553 data bus; the data bus allows the data from any of the aircraft's sensors to be shown on any of the in-cockpit displays, or sent to other aircraft using a data link.

The system broadcasts an average power of 396 watts, allowing it to detect fighter-sized targets at up to 40 nautical miles (74 km; 46 mi) in tracking modes, and up to 80 nautical miles (150 km; 92 mi) in velocity search. In the air-to-air mode it offers long-range velocity search, track-while-scan with up to ten tracked targets, and a variety of single-target-track and auto-lockon "dogfight" modes. It has a variety of pulse repetition frequencies that are automatically selected depending on whether or not the antenna is looking up or down.

The APG-67 also includes a variety of air-to-ground modes including real beam ground mapping, synthetic aperture radar imaging (SAR) and beacon tracking. It can also search for moving targets on the ground and offers tracking modes for ground targets similar to those for air-to-air use. These modes can also be used for sea-surface-search, in which case the display is de-cluttered to remove waves. The SAR mode is an optional add-on to the basic system.

== History ==
For many years Northrop had worked with Emerson Electric to provide a series of radars for their F-5 series. The original F-5A/B was designed as a light strike aircraft and had only a rudimentary ranging radar for the gunsight, and very little room in the nose for anything else. When the F-5 airframe was adapted into the F-5E/F for the air-to-air role, Emerson designed the AN/APQ-153 to fit into the extremely limited space in the F-5's nose. The small space and severe weight limitations meant that the APQ-153 could offer only the most basic features, including basic single-target-track and a scanning mode with a range about 10 nautical miles (19 km; 12 mi). A further upgrade produced the AN/APQ-159, which offered longer range of about 20 nautical miles (37 km; 23 mi), as well as offering a number of practical improvements like wider scanning angles and improved reliability.

When Northrop started work on the latest member of the F-5 family, then known as the F-5G, Emerson was initially selected to produce a version of the APQ-159 with the capability of firing the AIM-7 Sparrow missile at beyond visual range. However, as the project was repeatedly re-positioned during the late 1970s, Northrop developed the requirement for a much more capable design, able to support both air-to-air and air-to-ground modes like the radars being used in modern designs like the F-16 Fighting Falcon. Emerson's earlier designs were all analog systems so they were not a "shoe in" for the digital system Northrop was looking for, and they threw open the competition to anyone with a suitable design. Several proposals were returned, and General Electric eventually won the contract.

== See also ==
- List of radars
- List of military electronics of the United States
- Similar US military aircraft radars
