= Northrop F-20 Tigershark =

Prototype fighter aircraft developed from F-5

F-20 Tigershark
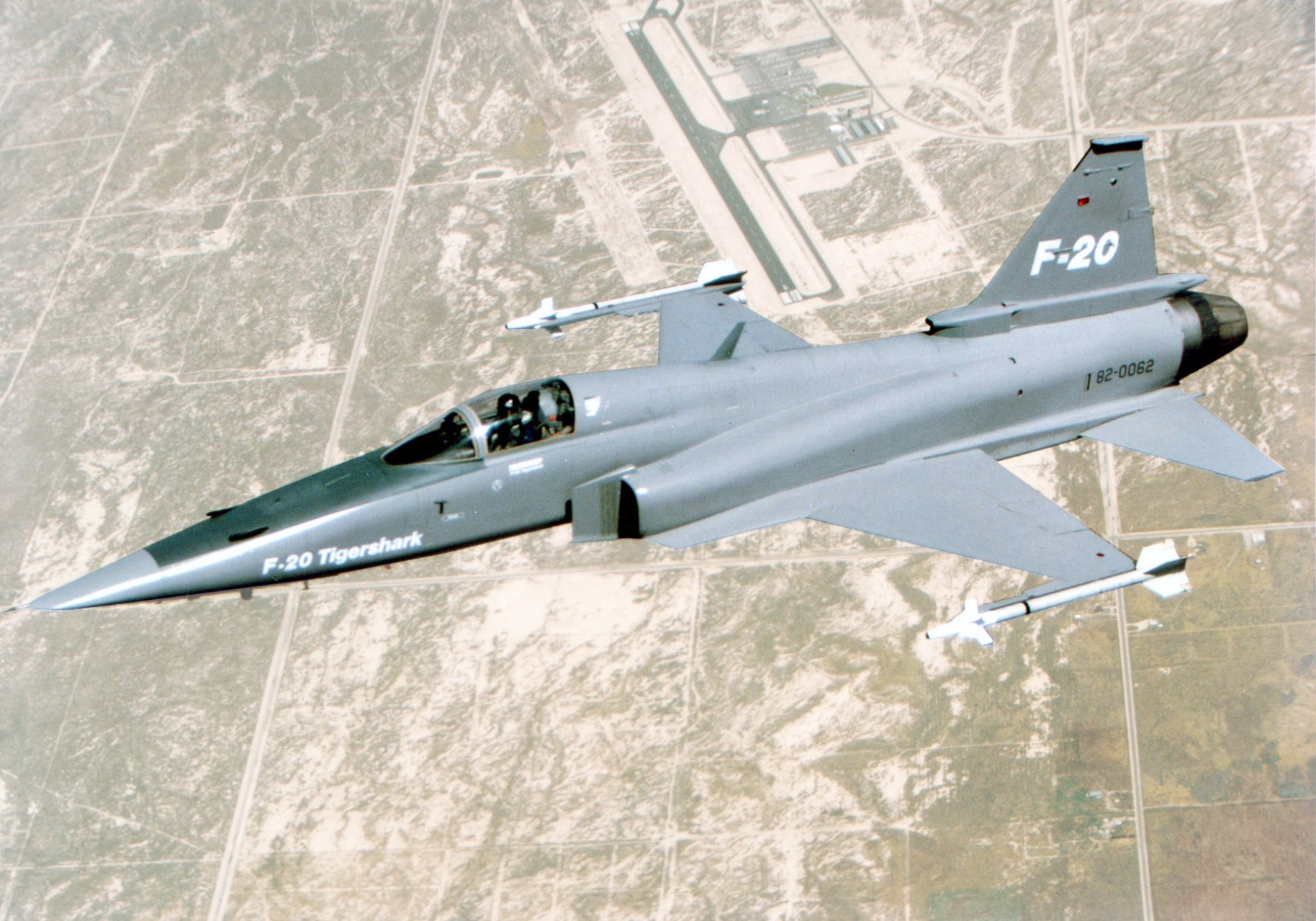
- F-20 prototype 82-0062

General information
- Type: Fighter aircraft
- National origin: United States
- Manufacturer: Northrop Corporation
- Status: Canceled
- Number built: 3

History
- First flight: 30 August 1982
- Developed from: Northrop F-5

The Northrop F-20 Tigershark (initially F-5G) is a prototype light fighter, designed and built by Northrop. Its development began in 1975 as a further evolution of Northrop's F-5E Tiger II, featuring a new engine that greatly improved overall performance, and a modern avionics suite including a powerful and flexible radar. Compared with the F-5E, the F-20 was much faster, gained beyond-visual-range air-to-air capability, and had a full suite of air-to-ground modes capable of utilizing most U.S. weapons. With these improved capabilities, the F-20 was claimed to become competitive with contemporary fighter designs such as the General Dynamics F-16 Fighting Falcon, but was said to be much less expensive to purchase and operate.

Much of the F-20's development was carried out under a US Department of Defense (DoD) project called "FX". FX sought to develop fighters that would be capable in combat with the latest Soviet aircraft, but excluding sensitive front-line technologies used by the United States Air Force's own aircraft. FX was a product of the Carter administration's military export policies, which aimed to provide foreign nations with high quality equipment without the risk of US front-line technology falling into Soviet hands. Northrop had high hopes for the F-20 in the international market, but policy changes following Ronald Reagan's election meant the F-20 had to compete for sales against aircraft like the F-16, the USAF's latest fighter design. The development program was abandoned in 1986 after three prototypes had been built and a fourth partially completed.

== Development ==
=== F-5 ===
When John F. Kennedy entered office in 1961, the U.S. Department of Defense was instructed to find an inexpensive fighter aircraft that the United States could offer to its allies through the Mutual Defense Assistance Act. A number of designs were studied, including stripped-down versions of the Lockheed F-104 Starfighter and Vought F-8 Crusader, and the newly designed Northrop N-156F. On 23 April 1962, the United States Air Force (USAF) informed the United States Secretary of Defense that the N-156F had been selected, under the designation F-5 and given the name "Freedom Fighter." 847 F-5s of various early marks would be produced.

As the Mikoyan-Gurevich MiG-21 became more common, the USAF initiated the International Fighter Aircraft (IFA) program to provide an equivalent to allies. The USAF desired a lightweight fighter with competitive performance to the MiG, inexpensive when purchased in large numbers, and with reasonable operating costs for prospective customer nations. Although numerous companies entered designs, Northrop's existing F-5 put them in a leading position. They submitted an upgrade, the F-5E Tiger II, with the AN/APQ-153 radar and other changes to allow the AIM-9 Sidewinder missile to be fired from wing-tip rails. On 20 November 1970, Northrop's entry was announced as the IFA winner. Northrop produced a total of 1,399 F-5E/F Tiger IIs by the time manufacturing ended in 1986.

=== F-5G and export limitations ===
In the late 1970s, the Taiwanese Republic of China Air Force started looking for a fighter aircraft to match improvements made in the Chinese People's Liberation Army Air Force. In particular, they wanted a platform capable of firing the AIM-7 Sparrow long-range missile. At the time, the US was in the process of opening up ties with the People's Republic of China after President Nixon's famous visit in 1972. China considered US support of Taiwan against their interests, and the US State Department wanted to tread carefully. They blocked export of all of the AIM-7 capable aircraft, even otherwise outdated early models of the McDonnell Douglas F-4 Phantom II. The State Department suggested the Israeli IAI Kfir instead; however, it was rejected. Taiwan was already producing the F-5E under license, so the Department of Defense asked Northrop to study adding an AIM-7 capable radar to the Tiger II as an alternative. This effort became the first of several F-5G studies.

In the spring of 1977, Jimmy Carter's administration had announced a new military export policy that limited sales of front line designs to NATO, Australia, and Japan. Carter stated at the time that the U.S. could not be "both the world's champion of peace and the world's leading supplier of the weapons of war." Previously, there was no coherent export policy, fueling concerns that the US's latest technologies might quickly end up in Soviet hands.

Numerous exceptions were made; Israel and Egypt could buy advanced designs under the Camp David Agreements, Israel was even allowed to buy McDonnell Douglas F-15 Eagles, a key component in U.S. air-defense technology. Iran was already receiving the Grumman F-14 Tomcat, and this demonstrated the problem with advanced exports in February 1979 when reports emerged that Iran had sold an AIM-54 Phoenix missile to the Soviets. South Korea's F-16 order was initially blocked under this policy, but later allowed in the context of strengthening relations. Despite exceptions, the export policy was implemented, covering many potential and current customers. As the F-5G was a relatively modest upgrade to the F-5E, the F-5G appeared to be in a strong position for sales given the limitations placed on rival designs; nonetheless, President Carter personally blocked the sales of the F-5G to Taiwan.

=== FX ===
In 1979, problems with the export policy were becoming apparent. The Soviets continued to sell newer aircraft designs to their clients, placing allies of the U.S. at a disadvantage. Denied by the U.S., countries were turning to other vendors for modern fighters, notably France's Dassault Mirage 2000. Barry N. Blechman, Assistant Director of the Arms Control and Disarmament Agency, testified that the US reductions in foreign arms transfers had actually encouraged other nations and increased worldwide arms sales. At the same time, there was considerable pressure to provide a suitable aircraft for Taiwan.

The State Department argued that the U.S. needed a modern counterpart for the role the F-5E had occupied in the 1960s and 1970s. In light of Carter's concerns, they suggested that a new aircraft be designed for the role, based on technology that would not pose a threat to the U.S. After a lengthy study, in January 1980, Carter allowed the development of a new export fighter: the FX. The FX would have to outperform the F-5E; however, it could not use any advanced avionics systems that were also used in U.S. aircraft. Unlike the Mutual Defense Assistance Act programs that led to the F-5E, FX would be entirely privately financed. Moreover, the companies could not market the aircraft directly; all sales would be handled by the Department of Defense.

Both Northrop and General Dynamics (GD) responded to the FX requirement. GD's F-16/79 was a variant of the F-16A, replacing the Pratt & Whitney F100 turbofan engine with the J79 turbojet and equipping it with downgraded avionics; Northrop responded with the F-5G.

=== F-20 ===
When Ronald Reagan's administration entered office in 1981, the export restrictions put in place by the Carter administration were slowly relaxed. At first, the FX program continued as normal, but a number of events eroded the value of the program and limited the F-5G's potential sales. The signing of the 1982 US-PRC Joint Communiqué was a major agreement on arms sales, which continued blocking sales of the F-5G to Taiwan. By this point the Taiwanese had started their own light fighter project, the AIDC F-CK-1 Ching-kuo. In signing the Communiqué, the U.S. was signaling that Taiwan would not receive modern aircraft; accordingly, the Ching-kuo became Taiwan's primary focus. As a result, the F-5G's sales potential remained unestablished.

In the summer of 1982, Deputy Secretary of Defense Frank Carlucci sent a memorandum to the USAF, encouraging it to seek out potential foreign customers to procure FX aircraft. However, four months later Carlucci sent a classified memo to the same services to abandon the FX, and green-lighting the exporting of front-line fighters overseas. In December, after prompting from the White House, Carlucci reversed his position again, and directed the USAF to fund a small number of F-20s in the fiscal year 1984 budget.

The future of the FX program seemed doubtful. Following an agreement to sell F-16s to Pakistan, Northrop felt that the F-5G needed to match the performance of F-16. This would require not only better performance from the engine, but a new and comparable avionics suite as well. Northrop saw that the F-5G was still being viewed as the "FX fighter", a low-cost option for second-tier air forces. To offset this impression, Northrop requested the designation "F-20"; the USAF approved in late 1982, and of the name Tigershark in March 1983. Northrop requested to skip F-19, the next available fighter designation, for an even number in order to stand out from the Soviet odd-numbered designations.

== Design ==
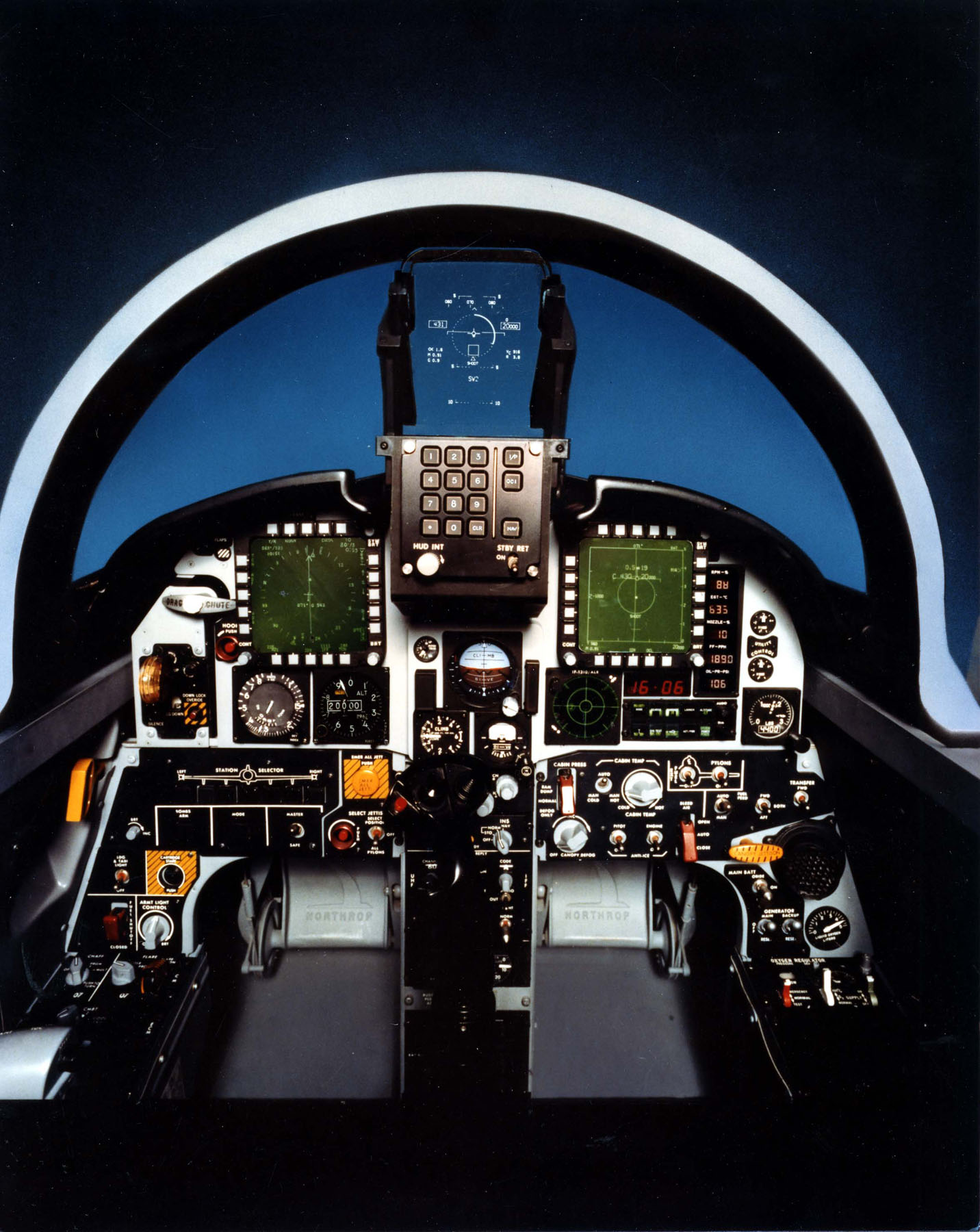
A mock-up of the prototype cockpit with two multi-function displays and HUD

The primary design change between the earlier F-5E and the F-20 was the use of a single General Electric F404 engine, which was originally designed for the F/A-18 Hornet. The new engine provided 60% more thrust than the combined output of the F-5E's two General Electric J85s. This improved the aircraft's thrust-to-weight ratio from 1.0 to 1.13. The new engine gave a speed of over Mach 2.0, a ceiling over 55,000 ft (16,800 m), an initial climb rate of 52,800 ft per minute (16,100 m/min).

The wing profile remained the same as the F-5E, but had modified leading edge extensions (LEX), which improved the maximum lift coefficient of the wing by about 12% with an increase in wing area of only 1.6%. The original aircraft was fairly sluggish in pitch, so the horizontal stabilizer was increased in size by 30% and a new dual-channel fly-by-wire control system was added. Destabilizing the aircraft in pitch and modifying the LEX improved the instantaneous turn rate by 7% to 20°/sec. Sustained turn rate at Mach 0.8 and 15,000 ft (4,572 m) rose to 11.5°/sec, which compared well with the F-16's 12.8°/sec. Supersonic turn rates were 47% higher than those of the F-5E.

The F-20 would also make greater usage of composite materials in its construction. During its development, several areas using metal were re-designed to use fiberglass, and there were numerous upgrades to various mechanical parts.

The F-20's avionics suite was all-new and greatly improved over the earlier designs. The General Electric AN/APG-67 multi-mode radar was the heart of the sensor suite, offering a wide range of air-to-air and air-to-ground modes. The F-5's electro-mechanical navigation system was replaced with an all-electronic version based on a ring laser gyroscope. Time from power-on to takeoff was greatly reduced as a result, to about 22 seconds, and Northrop boasted that the aircraft had the shortest scramble time of any contemporary aircraft. The cockpit of the F-5 was completely re-worked with a large head-up display (HUD) and two monochrome multi-function displays set high on the control panel, and the addition of a complete hands-on-throttle-and-stick (HOTAS) control system. Many of the avionics promised to have reliability beyond that of any competing aircraft then in service.

The F-20 would have been able to use most of the common weapons in U.S.'s inventory, including the entire range of Mark 80 series bombs, AGM-65 Maverick air-to-ground missiles, and the AIM-9 Sidewinder and AIM-7 Sparrow air-to-air missiles. Like the earlier F-5s, the test F-20s were equipped with two M39 cannon mounted in the nose. Production F-20s may have substituted two Ford Aerospace Tigerclaw cannons instead of the M39s; while the Tigerclaw was based on the M39, it was lighter and had a higher rate of fire than the M39A2.

The F-20 did, however, have several problems inherent to its small size. The low-mounted wing meant that there was limited ground clearance, and the position of the landing gear meant loads had to be positioned towards the outer ends of the wings. This limited hard point weights to 1,000 lb (454 kg). A single hard point under the fuselage could carry more, a single Mk 84 2,000 lbs bomb or up to five Mk 82 500 lbs bombs. Additionally, although the wing profiling improved lift at higher angles of attack (AoA) while maneuvering, it did not improve cruise lift performance at normal AoA. This did not present a problem in the fighter role, but did severely reduce its payload and range figures compared to similar aircraft like the F-16.

The F-20 was significantly more expensive than the previous generation F-5E. Among its Teen Series contemporaries, however, the F-20 was offered as a low-cost option; cost-wise it was estimated in 1983 that the unit fly-away cost of the F-20 (based on a 150-unit buy) was $10.7 million, compared to the F-16/79 at $11 million and the F-16A at $12.4 million. Unit life-cycle costs for the F-20 estimated as high as 40–50% lower than for the F-16. Another estimate of the F-20's costs found it less expensive than other designs like the $30 million F-15 Eagle, or $15 million F-16 Fighting Falcon. The F-20 was projected to consume 53% less fuel, to require 52% less maintenance manpower, to have 63% lower operating and maintenance costs and to be four times more reliable than average front-line designs of the era. The F-20 also offered the ability to fire the beyond-visual-range AIM-7 Sparrow missile, a capability that the F-16 lacked at that time, and did not gain until the F-16A/B Block 15 ADF version in February 1989.

== Operational history ==
=== Testing ===
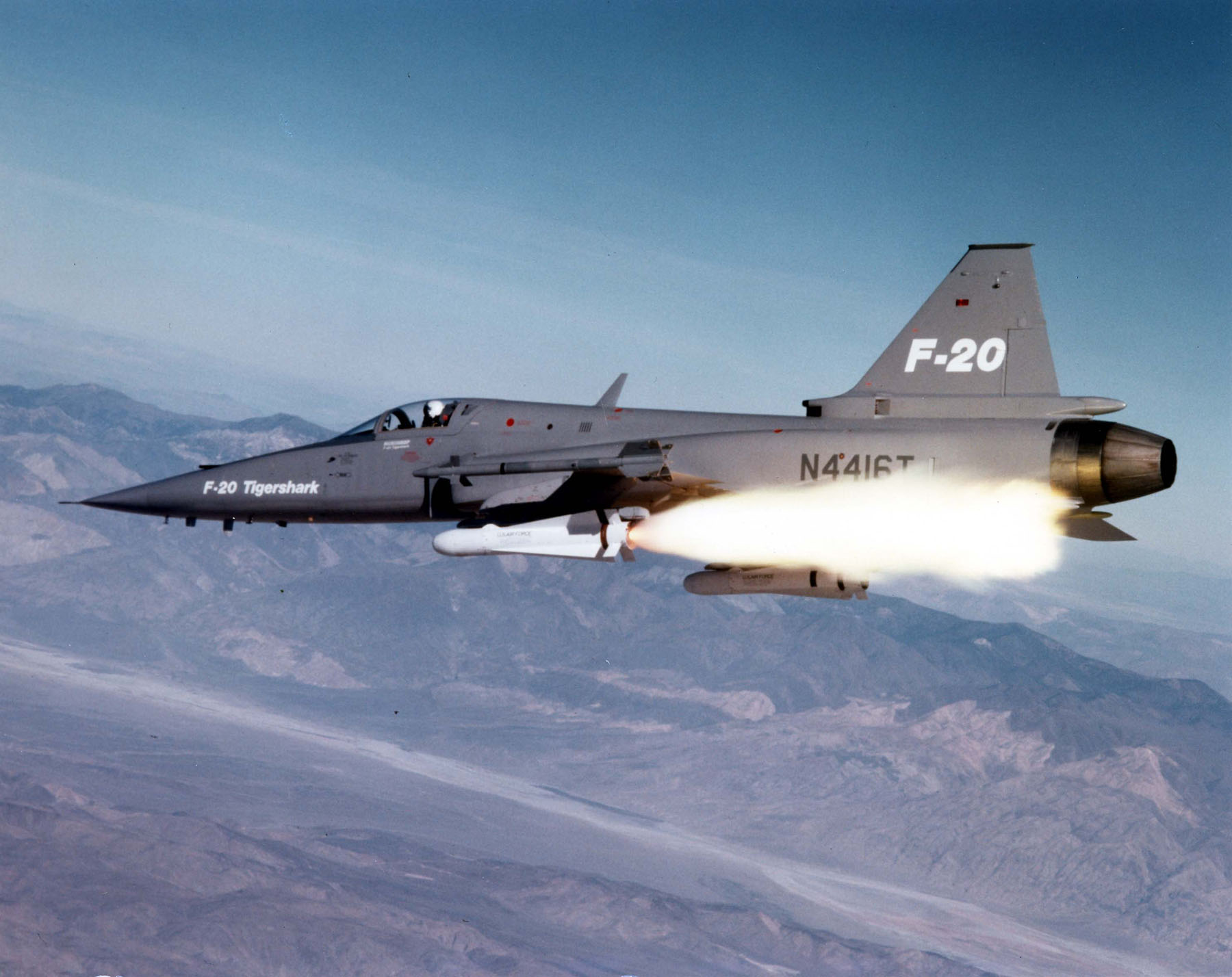
An F-20 launching an AGM-65 Maverick missile

On 30 August 1982, the original engine-change-only F-5G (serial 82-0062, c/n GG1001, registered N4416T) made its maiden flight piloted by Russ Scott. During the 40-minute flight, the prototype climbed to 40,000 ft (12,000 m) and reached Mach 1.04. GG1001 demonstrated outstanding reliability; by the end of April 1983 240 flights had been accumulated, including evaluation flights with 10 potential customer nations. The second prototype (serial number 82-0063, registered N3986B, c/n GI1001), featuring the complete avionics suite, made its first flight on 26 August 1983. The F-20 flew 1,500 flights prior to its termination; although these were exclusively flown in ideal conditions. According to the Rand Corporation, "Northrop did not take a prototype approach with the F-20… The first F-20 was intended to be a production quality aircraft…"

During the test program, the F-20 fired the AIM-9 Sidewinder and, in February 1985 the AIM-7 Sparrow. In air-to-ground testing, it fired the AGM-65 Maverick, 2.75 in (70 mm) folding fin aerial rockets, dropped Mk. 82 bombs, and fired rounds from a 30 mm (1.18 in) gun pod (GPU-5/A, four-barrel GAU-13/A) in addition to the two internal 20 mm (.79 in) M39 cannon. One of the F-20's flight characteristics was the ability to fly at only 124 km/h (77 mph) at 35° AoA (angle of attack), while the F-16 was limited to 30°; acceleration from Mach 0.9 to 1.2 in 29 seconds (at 9,150 m); climb to 12,200 m (or 40,000 ft) in 2.3 minutes (including 55 sec for the start and 22 for the INS set-up).

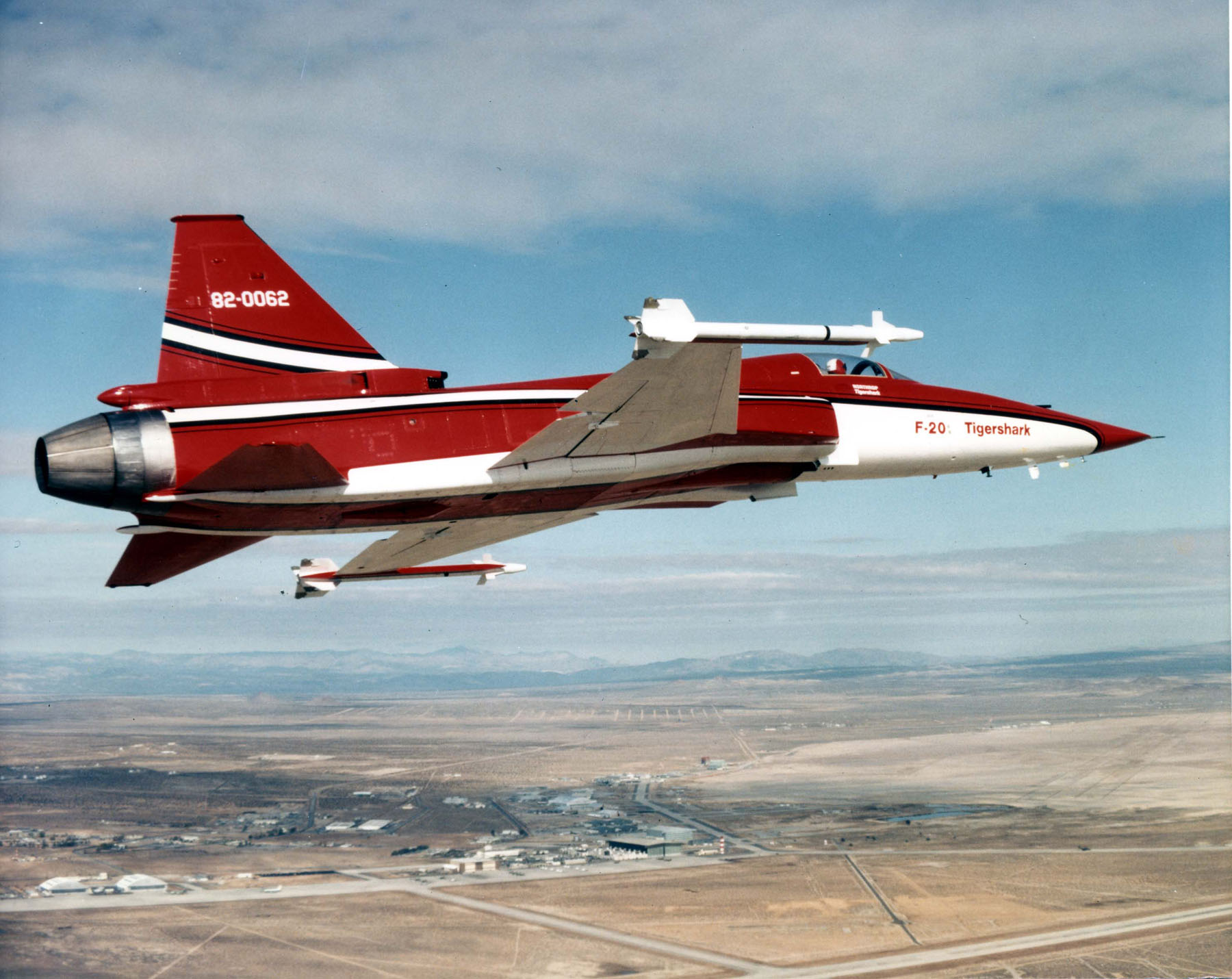
The first F-20 in Northrop colors.

Northrop signed a Memorandum of Agreement with the USAF in May 1983 that made the USAF responsible for certifying the F-20's performance, air worthiness and fixed-price program. Aerospace legend Chuck Yeager, employed as a spokesperson for Northrop, touted the aircraft as "magnificent" and was featured in advertising.

In November 1982, Bahrain became the first customer. South Korea also explored local production of the F-20, and in support improvements were implemented. These included avionics upgrades, an expanded fuel tank, and the use of fibreglass composites. The changes were so extensive that a fourth prototype was built to test them. By 1983, Northrop was involved in a number of simultaneous negotiations for the F-20, and its prospects appeared positive.

On 10 October 1984, GG1001 crashed in South Korea on a demonstration flight, killing Northrop pilot Darrell Cornell. An investigation cleared the F-20 of mechanical or design faults; it concluded Cornell had blacked out due to excessive g-forces. GI1001 crashed in May 1985 at Goose Bay, Labrador, killing Northrop pilot Dave Barnes. Again the crash was blamed on G-LOC; Barnes had been practicing his aerobatic routine for the Paris Air Show.

=== Battle for sales ===
F-20 Tigershark (1980) Official USAF promotional film reel.

In December 1981, President Reagan, reacting to the Soviet invasion of Afghanistan, signed a major economic and military aid package for Pakistan that included 40 F-16As. The offer was in keeping with U.S. policy towards the Soviet Union, and the idea of "containment" within a ring of U.S.-friendly countries. The Soviet invasion of Afghanistan was initially viewed as an attempt to break out of the arranged containment system, thus the U.S. placed a priority on quickly building up a new layer of defense. However, other U.S. allies saw this as a potential break in the FX policy, and began requesting only "the very best."

Such approval was increasingly granted starting in 1982. In May, Venezuela, who had long examined the FX project, agreed to buy 18 F-16As and six F-16Bs, replacing a fleet of Mirage III interceptors and Mirage 5 ground-attack aircraft. Sweden decided to develop their own design, the JAS 39 Gripen. In September 1983, Turkey announced plans to buy 132 F-16Cs and 28 F-16Ds to replace their Lockheed F-104G/S Starfighter and Northrop F-5A/B. Greece, stung by its long-time rival receiving the F-16, purchased 34 F-16C and six F-16Ds in November 1984, giving a firm pledge of secrecy.

The Indian government also evaluated purchasing the aircraft in May 1983, following a meeting by Indira Gandhi and Reagan as a part of a larger arms package including Howitzers and C-130. The deal for the F-20 did not proceed through, as India chose to build the HAL LCA and buy other Soviet weaponry. Then, late in 1983, the U.S. government made a financial commitment to help Israel develop its own new fighter, the IAI Lavi. Northrop objected to this, as the Lavi would be a potential competitor to the F-20 in the export market; while Northrop had to privately fund the F-20, the government was directly subsidizing a foreign competitor. Congressional support for Israel overruled Northrop's complaints along with complaints from other branches of the government.

While other companies marketed directly to foreign air forces, the F-20 could only be marketed by the State Department as part of the FX program. Under this policy umbrella, Northrop had to submit every piece of marketing material to government review, which could take months. The State Department had no interest in selling the FX; from its perspective it was one aircraft among many, leading to a lackadaisical approach, and led to complaints from Northrop that the government was not promoting the F-20 enough.

=== Congressional investigation ===
Starting in March 1984, Congress chaired a series of hearings into FX. William Schneider, Jr., the Under Secretary of State for Security Assistance, Science and Technology, testified that FX policy might not result in any sales, in spite of any government support. He stated that the sales of arms such as FX was primarily a matter of foreign policy, secondarily a commercial venture. Thomas V. Jones, Northrop's CEO, argued that there was little point independently developing aircraft if companies were reliant on the government to sell them. He suggested the FX policy be dropped, and F-20 allowed to be sold by the vendor. Additionally, Brigadier General Thomas Baker, USAF Director of International Programs, testified that the Air Force was not actively marketing FX. He observed that over four years the US had sold 100 fighters to 29 countries, none were FX. He also compared France's aircraft exports, showing a market for a low-cost fighter existed. In the Committee's concluding remarks, the State Department and DOD were accused of rhetoric, and lacking support, on FX.

In April 1984, after the Congressional hearings, the USAF was directed to promote FX actively. Several potential customers were briefed during May and June 1984 on the performance and cost of both the F-20 and F-16/79. The Air Force published an internal report on FX in late June 1984. The F-20 was characterized as having outstanding performance against viable threats; and seen as a candidate for the Air Force's aggressor requirement. The report additionally stated that the F-20 had been contractor-funded, totaling over $750 million, compared to $60 million on the F-16/79. However, the report concluded that it had little or no market to sell to.

=== Aggressor and Air National Guard roles ===
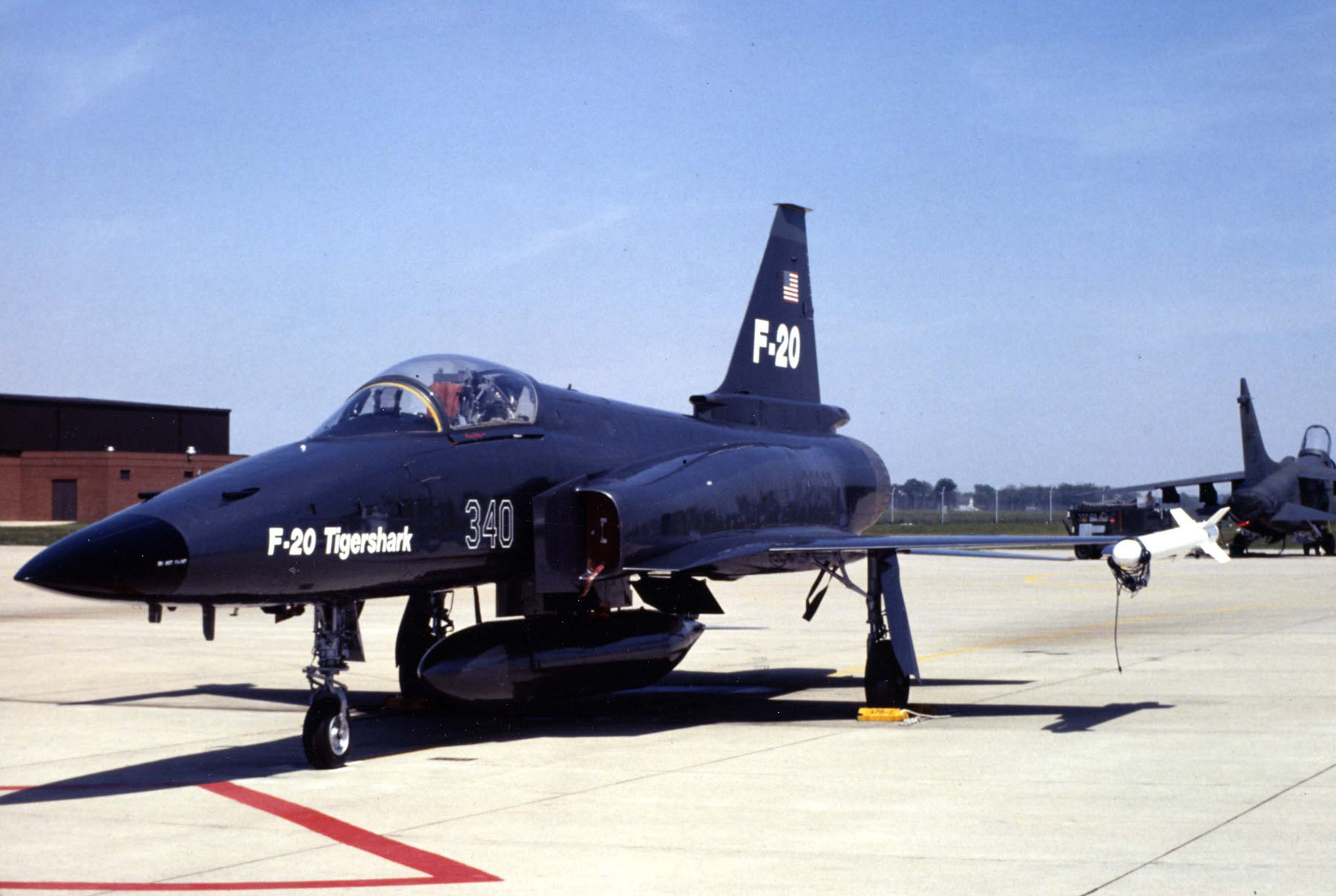
F-20 "GI1001" carrying its Paris Air Show identity number "340."

A possibility for a U.S. purchase opened in 1984, for a small number of "aggressor aircraft" for dissimilar air combat training. In November 1984, Congress directed the Air Force and Navy to study the use of a single aircraft type to fill similar aggressor roles for both services. In January 1985 the Navy announced they had selected a specially configured version of the F-16. It was rumored that the aircraft was sold at a loss to keep Northrop's F-20 out of the market.

Another chance for the F-20 was as an upgrade for the Air National Guard (ANG). Northrop claimed that the F-20's fast scramble time made it a natural fit for this role, its lower cost would allow the ANG to operate larger aircraft numbers, and that it supported the AIM-7 while the F-16 did not. However, the Air Force's requirements had priorities favoring the F-16 for the role; if the ANG flew the F-16, they would further lower unit costs, maintain commonality between the ANG and Regular Air Force, and better equip ANG units to perform front line combat roles. The Congressional Budget Office had also disputed Northrop's lower cost claim in their own research. On 31 October 1986, the Air Force announced that the F-16C had been selected, which had been upgraded to support the AIM-7. As several nations had suggested they would accept the F-20 on the condition that it was inducted into the USAF, the selection was a heavy blow to Northrop.

=== Cancellation ===
After six years with no buyers, in late 1986 Northrop canceled the $1.2 billion project. Northrop was reluctant to protest perceived favoritism of the F-16 in fear of losing support for the Northrop Grumman B-2 Spirit stealth bomber project. Ongoing negotiations with the Royal Moroccan Air Force for 20 F-20s were canceled; along with the small order by Bahrain. Later on, a bribery scandal would emerge from the attempts to market the F-20 to South Korea, leading to several Northrop managers resigning and the reprimanding of chief executive Thomas V. Jones, who retired in 1989.

In the late 1980s, local production of the F-20 was discussed with India. A move was also made in the 1980s to market the aircraft to the Pakistan Air Force with a license production manufacture of the aircraft. It was evaluated by a Pakistani contingent in the United States, with the F-20 being flown by Abbas Mirza, a senior Pakistani Air Force fighter pilot. Of the components of the F-20, the radar would end up being the most successful; Taiwan selected it for the Ching-kuo, South Korea also adopted it for the KAI T-50 Golden Eagle trainer aircraft. As sales prospects were not apparent early on, GE sold their radar division, which was eventually acquired by Lockheed Martin.

Aviation author Steve Pace wrote of the F-20 as "one of the best fighters that never went into production." While discussing military procurement, Thomas McNaugher stated that competition between the F-20 and the F-16 served to lower prices and generate "massive savings" for the U.S. government. Writing prior to cancellation, Ralph Nader and William Taylor noted that the F-20 had been commonly described as "the first privately funded U.S. combat aircraft in recent history." Mazher A. Hameed commented in 1986 that the F-20 was a "logical choice" for the Gulf States and Saudi Arabia; however, it had "scant chance of being selected" due to political factors, as well as competition from other candidates such as the Mirage 2000 and Panavia Tornado ADV.

== Aircraft disposition ==
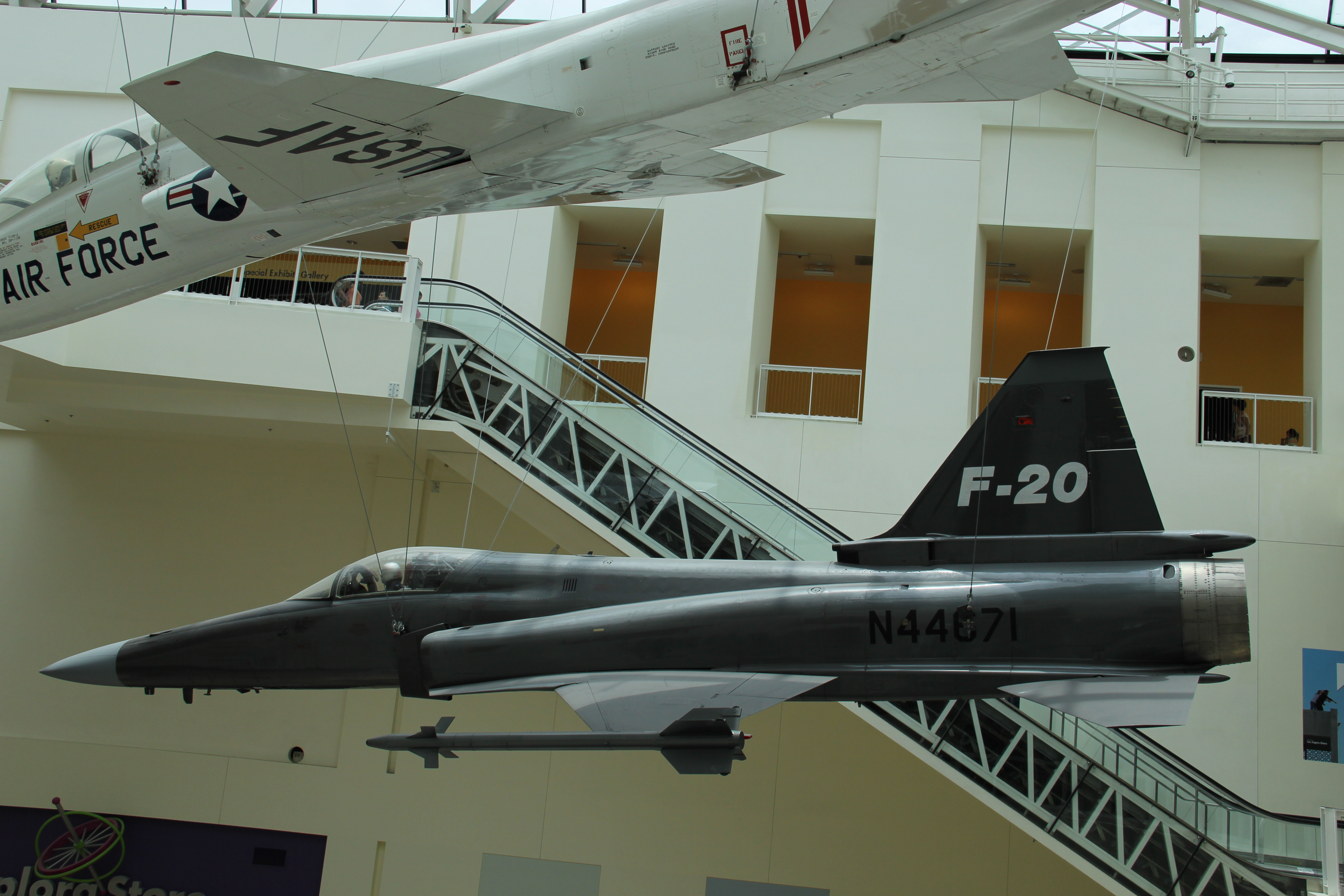
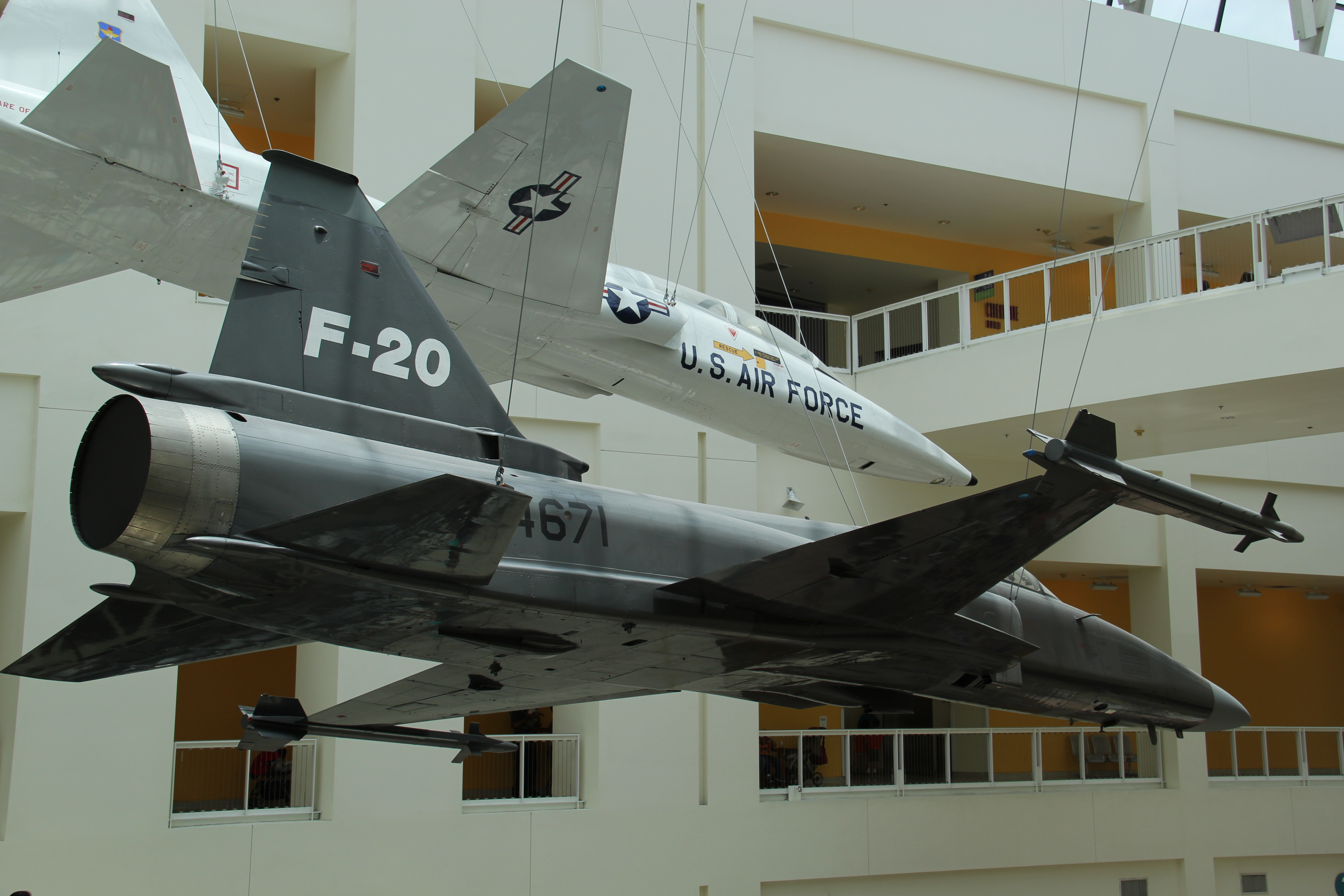
The remaining F-20 is on display at the California Science Center in Los Angeles.
- 82-0062 (Northrop serial number GG.1001) – crashed at Suwon Air Base, South Korea on 10 October 1984. Pilot killed.
- 82-0063 (Northrop serial number GI.1001) – crashed at CFB Goose Bay, Canada on 14 May 1985. Pilot killed.
- 82-0064 (Northrop serial number GI.1002) – California Science Center in Exposition Park, Los Angeles, California.

== Specifications (F-20) ==
Data from Northrop F-5/F-20/T-38, Complete Encyclopedia of World Aircraft, Jane's All the World's Aircraft 1984–85

General characteristics

- Crew: 1
- Length: 47 ft 4 in (14.43 m)
- Wingspan: 27 ft 11.875 in (8.53123 m) with wing-tip missiles

26 ft 8 in (8.13 m) clean

- Height: 13 ft 10.25 in (4.2228 m)
- Airfoil: NACA 65A004.8 modified
- Empty weight: 11,810 lb (5,357 kg)
- Gross weight: 16,015 lb (7,264 kg) Combat TOW - 50% fuel 2x AIM-9
- Max takeoff weight: 27,500 lb (12,474 kg)
- Fuel capacity: 5,050 lb (2,291 kg) in integral and bladder tanks
- Powerplant: 1 × General Electric F404-GE-100 afterburning turbofan engine, 11,000 lbf (49 kN) thrust dry, 17,000 lbf (76 kN) with afterburner

Performance

- Maximum speed: 1,147 kn (1,320 mph, 2,124 km/h)
- Maximum speed: Mach 2
- Range: 320 nmi (370 mi, 590 km) in air superiority mission with 2 × AIM-9 and 5 minutes air combat

150 nmi (170 mi; 280 km) in close air support with 2 × AIM-9 + 7 × Mk 82s + 2 × 330 US gal (270 imp gal; 1,200 L) drop tanks
300 nmi (350 mi; 560 km) in combat air patrol with 2 × AIM-9 + 3 × 330 US gal (270 imp gal; 1,200 L) drop tanks, 138 minutes on station + 20 minutes reserve
550 nmi (630 mi; 1,020 km) for hi-lo-hi interdiction with 2 × AIM-9 + 5 × Mk 82 + 2 × 330 US gal (270 imp gal; 1,200 L) drop tanks

- Ferry range: 2,015 nmi (2,319 mi, 3,732 km) with full internal fuel and 3 × 330 US gal (270 imp gal; 1,200 L) drop tanks
- Service ceiling: 56,800 ft (17,300 m)
- Combat ceiling: 15,000 ft (4,572 m)
- g limits: +9
- Thrust/weight: 1.1
- Sustained turn rate: 13.2°/s at M0.8 at 15,000 ft (4,572 m)
- Take-off run: 1,425 ft (434 m)
- Take-off run at MTOW: 3,550 ft (1,082 m)
- Landing run: 2,150 ft (655 m)

Armament

- Guns: 2 × 20 mm (0.79 in) Pontiac M39A3 cannons in the nose, 280 rounds each and a General Electric 30 mm gun pod which can be mounted on the fuselage
- Hardpoints: 7 external hardpoints with a capacity of 8,000 lb (3,600 kg) of bombs, missiles, rockets, gun pods and up to 3 drop tanks for extended range
- Rockets: 2 × CRV7 rocket pods or
  2 × LAU-10 rocket pods with 4 × Zuni 5 in (127 mm) rockets each or
  2 × Matra rocket pods with 18 × SNEB 68 mm rockets each
- Missiles: 2 × AIM-9 Sidewinders on wing tip launch rails (similar to F-16 and F/A-18)
  Up to 2 × AIM-7 Sparrows or 4 × AIM-120 AMRAAMs or 4 × AIM-9 Sidewinders on underwing hardpoints or
  4 × AGM-65 Maverick air-to-surface missiles on underwing hardpoints
- Bombs: Various air-to-ground ordnance such as Mark 80 series of unguided iron bombs (including 3 kg and 14 kg practice bombs), CBU-24/49/52/58 cluster bomb munitions, M129 Leaflet bomb

Avionics

- General Electric AN/APG-67

== Notable appearances in media ==
Auto manufacturer Peugeot ran a commercial for the 1986 Peugeot 205 GTI 1.9 which featured an F-20. It opened with the 205 parachuting over snowy mountains. The F-20 fires a missile with the camera showing off an MFD, joystick controls, and heads-up display, and the missile appears to blow up the parachute. The car successfully lands and drives away.

== See also ==
Related development

- Northrop F-5
- Northrop T-38 Talon

Aircraft of comparable role, configuration, and era

- AIDC F-CK-1 Ching-kuo
- HAL Tejas
- CAC/PAC JF-17 Thunder
- General Dynamics F-16 Fighting Falcon (Block 10)

Related lists

- List of military aircraft of the United States
- List of fighter aircraft
