= Darrell Cornell =

Darrell Cornell.

Darrell Eugene Cornell (August 19, 1932 - October 10, 1984) was Northrop's chief test pilot in the early 1980s. He was killed on October 10, 1984, at Suwon Air Base, while performing a demonstration flight for the South Korean Air Force (ROKAF). The F-20, 82-0062, c/n GG1001, N4416T, he was piloting stalled after a series of climbing rolls performed with flaps and gear extended. Cornell was not able to recover the aircraft from the uncontrolled stall. Cornell was also the lead test pilot for Northrop's RF-5E Tigereye, a reconnaissance version of the low-cost F-5E fighter aircraft.

He was featured in the April 1984 issue of LIFE magazine in an article entitled "Edwards Air Force Base Pilots", together with Doug Benefieds, Chuck Sewell, Tony LeVier, and Russell O'Quinn.

Cornell was born in Moorhead, Minnesota, grew up in Fargo, North Dakota, and was a former USAF pilot. He was an alumnus of North Dakota State University. He was also an astronaut candidate with NASA in 1963, although he was not selected to join Group 3. He began at Northrop in 1962. His display performances flying the F-20 in Paris, France (Le Bourget 1983) and Farnborough, England in 1984 are remembered by many as some of the finest ever performed at these airshows.
