= EL/M-2032 =

Type of aircraft radar

The EL/M-2032 is an advanced pulse Doppler, multimode planar array radar fire-control radar intended for multi-role fighter aircraft originated from the Lavi project. It is suitable for air-to-air and air-to-surface modes.

As of 2009, Elta has integrated this radar system into the Sea Harrier, A-4, F-4, F-5, F-16, FA-50, Mirage, Tejas Mk 1 and MiG-21 fighters.

== Specifications ==
- Weights: Max Weight 100 kg (220 lb)
- Performance: Max Range for air to air targets - 222 km (120 nm), Max Range for air to ground targets - 222 km (120 nm), Max Range for air to sea targets - 370 km (200 nm)
