= KAI T-50 Golden Eagle =

Family of South Korean jet aircraft

T-50 / FA-50
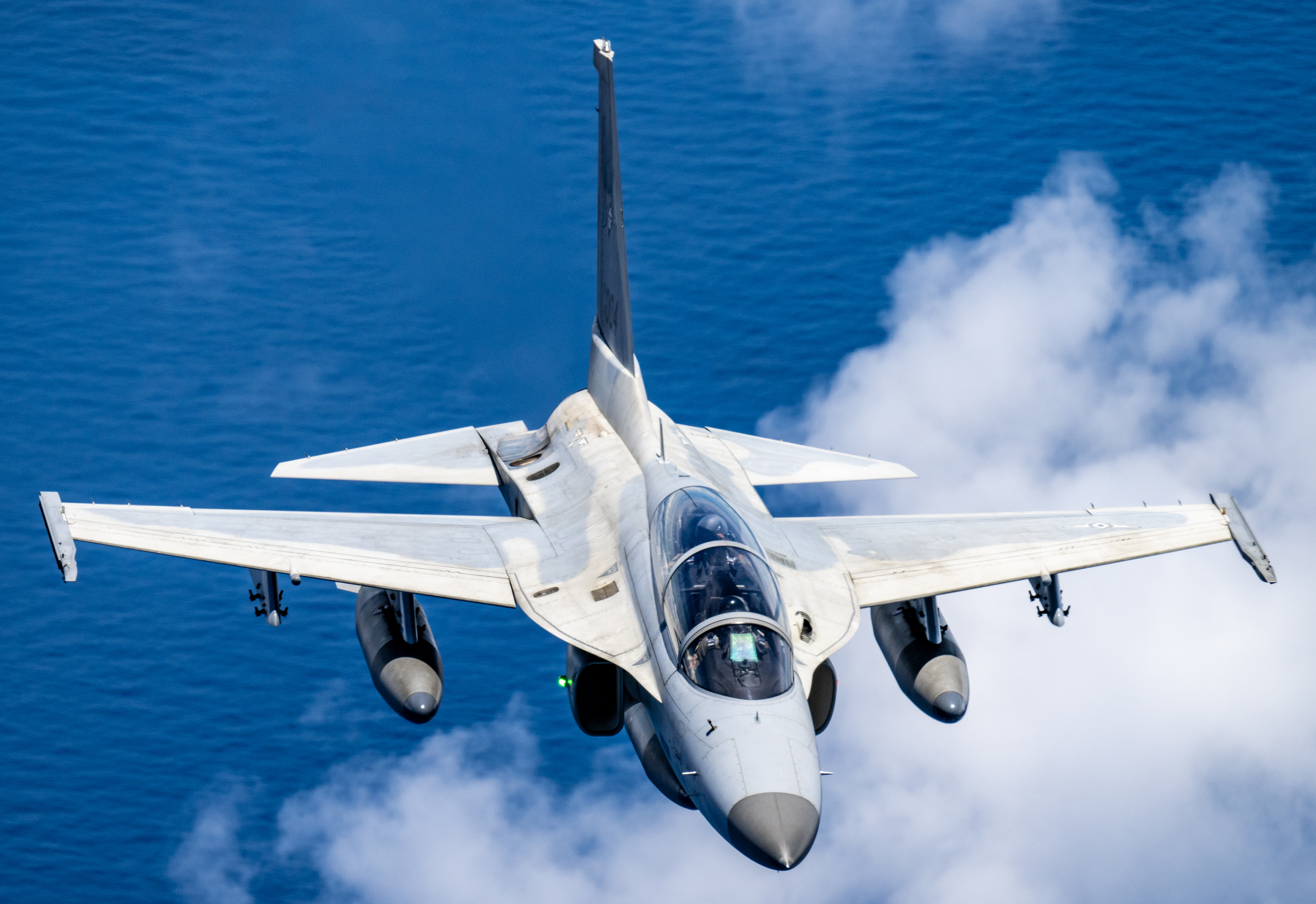
- A Philippine Air Force FA-50PH

General information
- Type: T-50: Advanced trainer jet TA-50: Lead-in fighter-trainer FA-50: Light combat aircraft FA-50 Block 20: Multirole light fighter
- National origin: South Korea
- Manufacturer: Korea Aerospace Industries; Lockheed Martin
- Status: In service
- Primary users: Republic of Korea Air Force Iraqi Air Force; Indonesian Air Force; Royal Thai Air Force
- Number built: 226 (2026)

History
- Manufactured: 2001–present
- Introduction date: 22 February 2005
- First flight: 20 August 2002

The KAI T-50 Golden Eagle (Korean: 골든이글) is a family of advanced, supersonic, South Korean jet trainers, light combat aircraft, light strike fighters and multirole light fighters developed by Korea Aerospace Industries (KAI) with Lockheed Martin. It is South Korea's first indigenous supersonic aircraft and one of the world's few supersonic trainers.

Development of the T-50 began in the late 1990s, and its maiden flight occurred in 2002. It entered service with the Republic of Korea Air Force (ROKAF) in 2005. The T-50 has been further developed into aerobatic and combat variants, namely T-50B, TA-50, and FA-50. An F-50 single-seat multirole fighter variant was considered before being cancelled. The T-50B serves with the South Korean Air Force's aerobatics team.

The T-50 is in service with several countries. Iraq received 24 training variants designated T-50IQ in 2016. The TA-50 light attack variant has also been operated by Indonesia with 16 planes entering service in 2014 and an additional six aircraft ordered in 2021. The Philippines operates the FA-50 light fighter variant with 12 delivered. Thailand ordered 12 units of the T-50 advanced trainer variant (T-50TH) starting in 2015. In 2022, Poland ordered 48 FA-50 aircraft, followed by Malaysia in 2023 which ordered 18 of the latest Block 20 variant.

== Development ==
=== Origins ===
The T-50 program was originally intended to develop an indigenous trainer aircraft capable of supersonic flight, to train and prepare pilots for the KF-16 and F-15K, replacing trainers such as T-38 and A-37 that were then in service with the ROKAF. Prior South Korean aircraft programs include the turboprop KT-1 basic trainer produced by Daewoo Aerospace (now part of KAI), and license-manufactured KF-16. In general, the T-50 series of aircraft, specifically the FA-50, closely resembles the KF-16 in configuration.

The mother program, code-named KTX-2, began in 1992, but the Ministry of Finance and Economy suspended KTX-2 in 1995 due to financial constraints. The basic design of the aircraft was set by 1999. The development of the aircraft was funded 70% by the South Korean government, 17% by KAI, and 13% by Lockheed Martin.

The aircraft was formally designated as the T-50 Golden Eagle in February 2000. The T-50A designation was reserved by the U.S. military to prevent it from being inadvertently assigned to another aircraft model. Final assembly of the first T-50 took place between 15 January – 14 September 2001. The first flight of the T-50 took place in August 2002, with initial operational assessment from 28 July – 14 August 2003.

KAI and Lockheed Martin were pursuing a joint marketing program for the T-50 internationally. The ROKAF placed a production contract for 25 T-50s in December 2003, with aircraft scheduled to be delivered between 2005 and 2009. Original T-50 aircraft are equipped with the AN/APG-67(v)4 radar from Lockheed Martin. The T-50 is equipped with a GE F404 engine with Full Authority Digital Engine Control (FADEC) built under license by Samsung Techwin. Under the terms of the T-50/F404-102 co-production agreement, GE provides engine kits directly to Samsung Techwin, which produces designated parts and performs final engine assembly and testing.

=== Improved variants ===
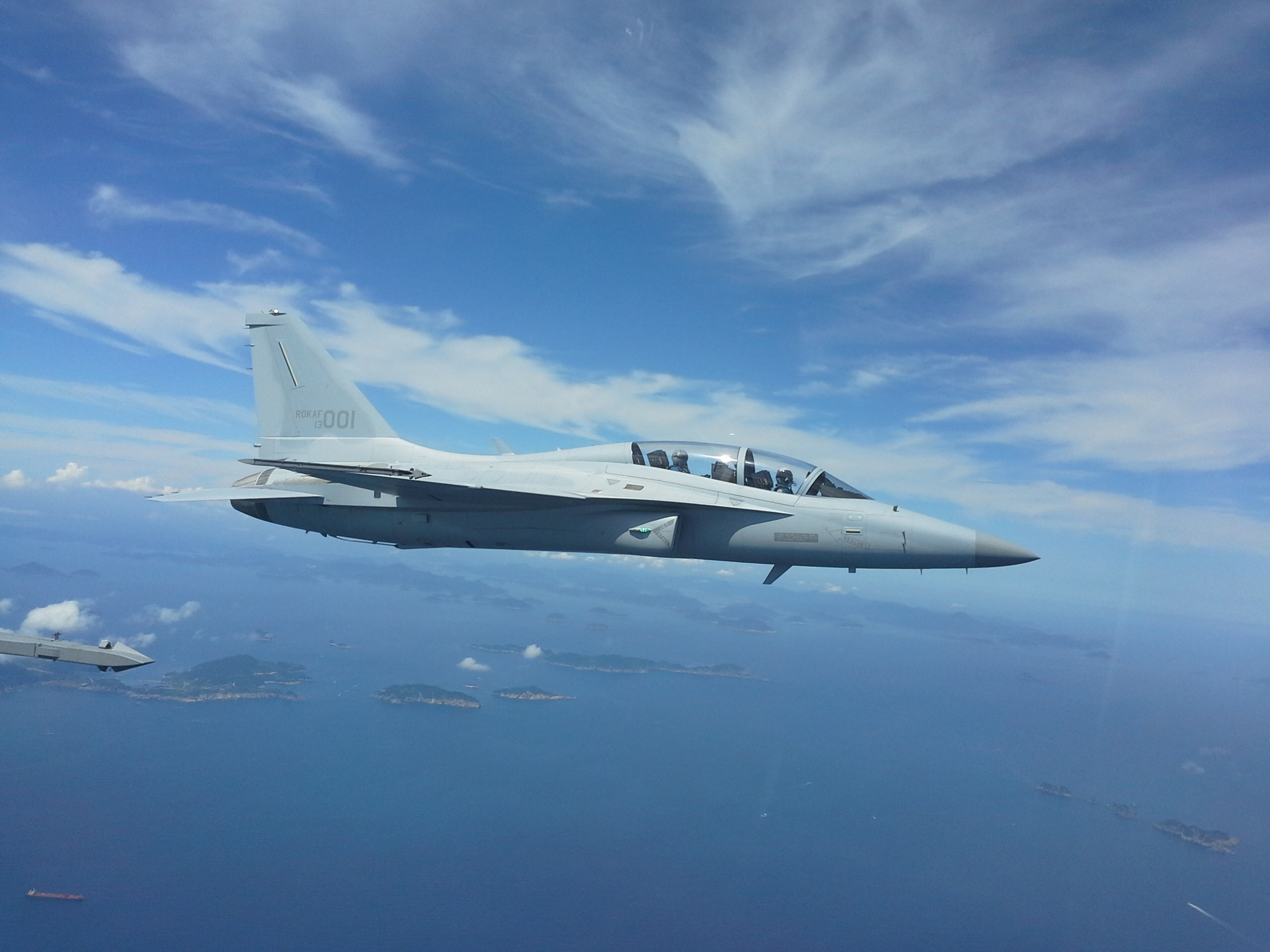
FA-50 prototype 001 on test flight

The program has expanded beyond a trainer concept to include the TA-50 light attack aircraft and the FA-50 light combat aircraft. The TA-50 variant is a more heavily armed version of the T-50 trainer, intended for lead-in fighter training and light attack roles. It is equipped with the Elta EL/M-2032 fire control radar. The TA-50 is designed to operate as a full-fledged combat platform for precision-guided weapons, air-to-air missiles, and air-to-ground missiles. The TA-50 can mount additional utility pods for reconnaissance, targeting assistance, and electronic warfare. Reconnaissance and electronic warfare variants are also being developed, designated RA-50 and EA-50, respectively.

The FA-50 is an advanced version of the T-50, possessing more internal fuel capacity, enhanced avionics, a longer radome, and a tactical datalink. It is equipped with a modified Israeli EL/M-2032 pulse-Doppler radar with Korean-specific modifications by LIG Nex1. The engine could be either Eurojet EJ200 or General Electric F414 with thrust of 89 to 98 kN (20,000 to 22,000 lbf), roughly 12–25% higher than the F404's thrust; and are offered to prospective customers for the T-50. The radar of the FA-50 has a range two-thirds greater than the TA-50's radar. The EL/M-2032 was initially chosen over Lockheed Martin's preferred AN/APG-67(V)4 and SELEX Vixen 500E active electronically scanned array (AESA) radars. Other AESA radars such as Raytheon's AN/APG-79 and Northrop Grumman's AN/APG-83 are options for future production, and may be shared with the radar chosen for USAF and ROKAF F-16 fighters. During the 2010s, Samsung Thales independently worked on a domestic multi-mode AESA radar for the FA-50.

In December 2008, South Korea awarded a contract to KAI to convert four T-50s to FA-50 standard by 2012. In 2012, the ROKAF ordered 20 FA-50 fighters to be delivered by the end of 2014. The maiden flight of the FA-50 took place in 2011. 60 FA-50 aircraft are to be produced for the ROKAF from 2013 to 2016. KAI received a ₩1.1 trillion (equivalent to ₩1.38 trillion or US$1.03 billion in 2025) order for the FA-50 in May 2013.

In December 2015, KAI revealed the KAI-LM T-50 T-X upgrade intended to compete in the U.S. T-X program. This variant features a dorsal hump for extra internal fuel and an aerial refuelling receptacle, large area display (LAD), and embedded ground training systems.

In October ADEX 2017, KAI unveiled the T-50A as a new variant based on the FA-50, including fifth generation cockpit, an aerial refuelling receptacle, cockpit multifunction display, dorsal hump for extra internal fuel, and an embedded training suite. By January 2019, KAI had begun development on the improved FA-50, referred to as the Block 10 and Block 20 upgrades. Block 10 is a software upgrade that can use the Lockheed Martin AN/AAQ-33 sniper targeting pod, while the Block 20 has an improved capability for beyond-visual-range air-to-air missions, carrying munitions such as the AIM-120 AMRAAM.

On 15 May 2023, KAI chose the Raytheon PhantomStrike over the Northrop Grumman AN/APG-83 to be the FA-50 Block 20's radar. The PhantomStrike weighs 68 kg (150 lb) (lighter than the existing FA-50 radar) and is an air-cooled compact AESA radar with digital beam forming and steering, multi-mode functionality and interleaved ground and air targeting capabilities. PhantomStrike was delivered to KAI in 2025, according to Raytheon.

KAI had developed plans for a single-seat version of the FA-50 designated the F-50. This plan was initially put on hold to focus on development of the KF-21, but it was later revisited as part of an effort by the company to increase export sales. The F-50 is claimed to have 80% of the capabilities of an F-16 but at a lower cost; development is planned to be completed by 2028. The South Korean Ministry of Trade, Industry and Energy (MOTIE) began funding the project in 2024. The F-50 will remove the second pilot and cockpit and install a 1,100-litre (300 US gal) auxiliary fuel system that will extend its operational radius over the FA-50's 239 nmi (443 km) by 20%–30%.

== Design ==
=== Overview ===
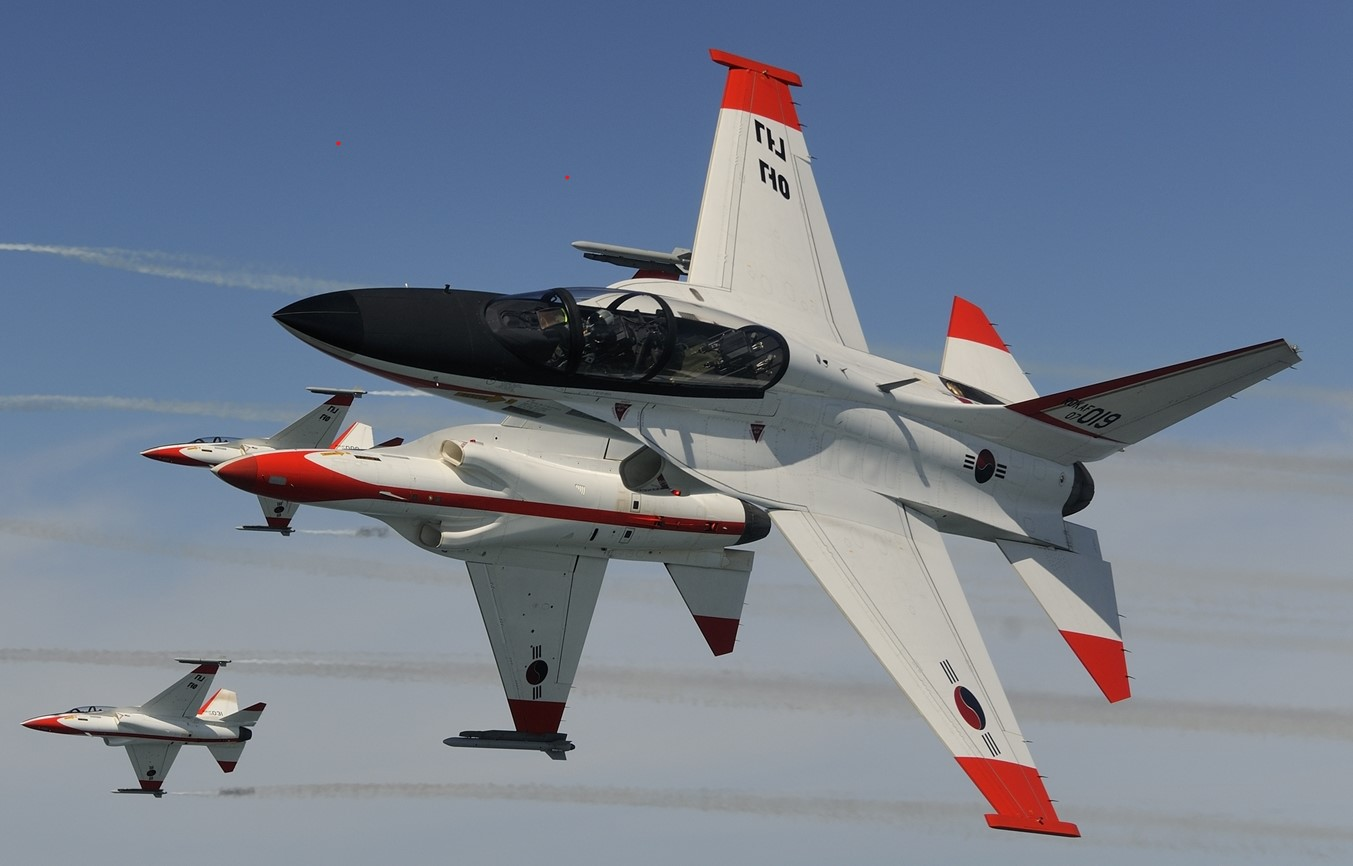
A T-50 squadron performing aerobatic maneuvers during a demonstration flight

The T-50 Golden Eagle resembles the F-16 Fighting Falcon, though it is only 80% of the size. The trainer has seating for two pilots in a tandem arrangement. The high-mounted canopy developed by Hankuk Fiber is applied with stretched acrylic, providing the pilots with good visibility. The trainer has been tested to offer the canopy with ballistic protection against 4 lb objects impacting at 400 knots. The altitude limit is 14,600 m (48,000 ft), and the airframe is designed to last 8,000 hours of service. The seven internal fuel tanks have a capacity of 2,655 L (701 US gal), five in the fuselage and two in the wings. An additional 1,710 L (452 US gal) of fuel can be carried in the three external fuel tanks. T-50 trainer variants have a paint scheme of white and red, and aerobatic variants white, black, and yellow.

The T-50 uses a single General Electric F404-102 turbofan engine license-produced by Samsung Techwin, upgraded with a FADEC system jointly developed by General Electric and KAI. The engine consists of three-staged fans, a seven-axial-stage arrangement, and an afterburner. The aircraft has a maximum speed of Mach 1.5. Its engine produces a maximum of 78.7 kN (17,700 lbf) of thrust with afterburner. The more powerful GE F414 and Eurojet EJ200 engines have been suggested as the new engine for the T-50 family.

=== Avionics ===
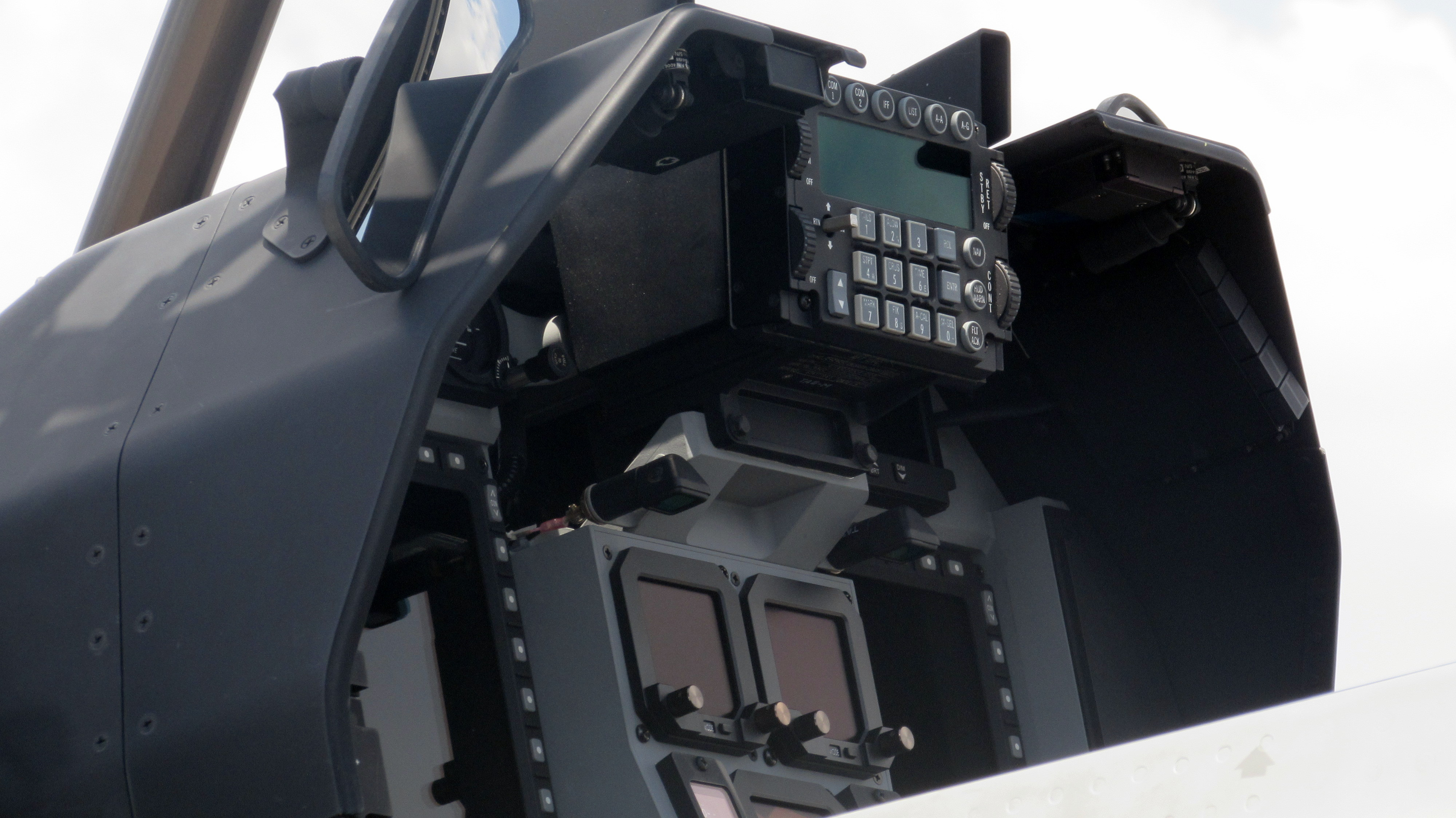
FA-50PH's rear cockpit

Lockheed Martin designed many of the avionics and provides the fly-by-wire system. The T-50's central processing unit and its operating system are developed by MDS Technology. The T-50's NEOS avionics operating system is the first and only real-time operating system to be developed by an Asian company, and holds both DO-178B and IEEE POSIX certification. Samsung Thales and LIG Nex1 are the main avionics and Electronic warfare equipment developers for T-50 and its variants. Other South Korean companies and defense institutes such as DoDAAM Systems, Aeromaster, Intellics, and Korea Institute of Defense Analysis are responsible for the aircraft's secondary avionics and embedded systems, including store management computers, avionics testing equipment, flight data recorders, portable maintenance aids, data analysis software, post-flight data processing system, aircraft structure and engine management software, and mission planning and support systems. The TA-50 version is equipped with an Elta EL/M-2032 fire control radar.

The T-50 is equipped with a Honeywell H-764G embedded global positioning/inertial navigation system and HG9550 radar altimeter. The aircraft is the first trainer to feature triple-redundant digital fly-by-wire controls. The cockpit panels, switches, and joysticks are produced by South Korea's FirsTec and Sungjin Techwin, head-up display by DoDaaM Systems, and multi-function display by Samsung Thales. Other South Korean subcontractors such as Elemech, Dawin Friction, and Withus cooperate in T-50 components production. Hanwha supplies the mechanical parts for the flight control system, and WIA supplies the undercarriage.

=== Armament and equipment ===
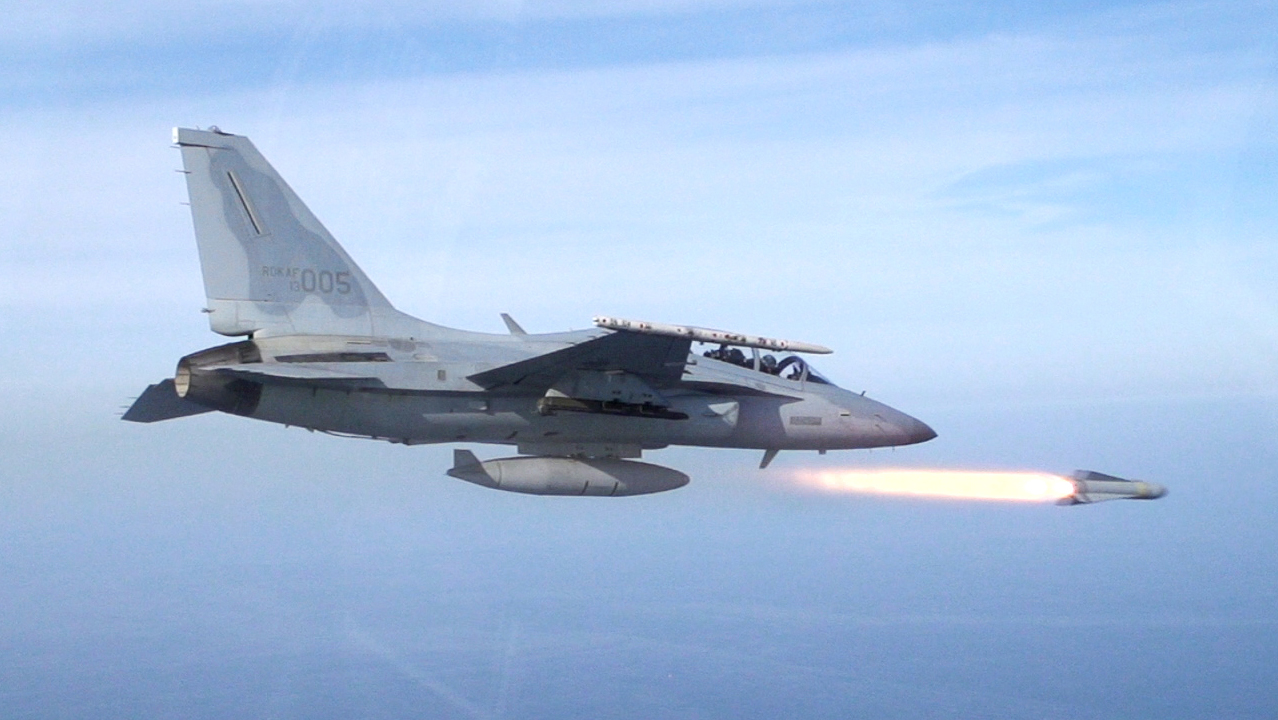
FA-50 is firing AGM-65G Maverick

The TA-50 has a three-barrel M197 cannon, based on the M61 Vulcan, mounted internally behind the cockpit, which fires linkless 20 mm ammunition. Wingtip rails can accommodate the AIM-9 Sidewinder missile, and a variety of additional weapons can be mounted on underwing hardpoints. Compatible air-to-surface weapons include the AGM-65 Maverick missile, Hydra 70 and LOGIR rocket launchers, CBU-58 and Mk-20 cluster bombs, and Mk-82, −83, and −84 general-purpose bombs.

The FA-50 can be externally fitted with Rafael's Sky Shield or LIG Nex1's ALQ-200K ECM pods, Sniper or LITENING targeting pods, and Condor 2 reconnaissance pods to further improve its electronic warfare, reconnaissance, and targeting capabilities. Other armaments include SPICE multifunctional guidance kits, Textron CBU-97/105 Sensor Fuzed Weapon with WCMD tail kits, JDAM, JDAM-ER for more comprehensive air-to-ground operations, and AIM-120 missiles for BVR air-to-air operations. FA-50 has provisions for, but does not yet integrate, Python and Derby missiles, also produced by Rafael, and other anti-ship missiles, stand-off weapons, and sensors to be domestically developed by Korea. The South Korean military is reviewing whether to arm the FA-50 with a smaller version of the Taurus KEPD 350 missile to give it a stand-off engagement capability of 400 km (250 mi). European missile maker MBDA's Meteor and ASRAAM medium and short-range air-to-air missiles are also reportedly available for integration on the FA-50 and the KF-X.

== Operational history ==
=== Republic of Korea ===
In 2011, the first squadron with the TA-50, the T-50's light attack variant, became operational with the ROKAF. The ROKAF's Black Eagles aerobatic team operates the T-50B version. In 2014, the FA-50 was officially deployed by the ROKAF with President Park Geun-hye officially leading a ceremony during which a flight demonstration was held showing its capabilities. 20 FA-50s were assigned to a dedicated Air Force wing. The ROKAF ordered 60 FA-50s. On 9 October 2014, an FA-50 successfully test fired an AGM-65 Maverick at a stationary target, a retired ship.

=== Indonesia ===
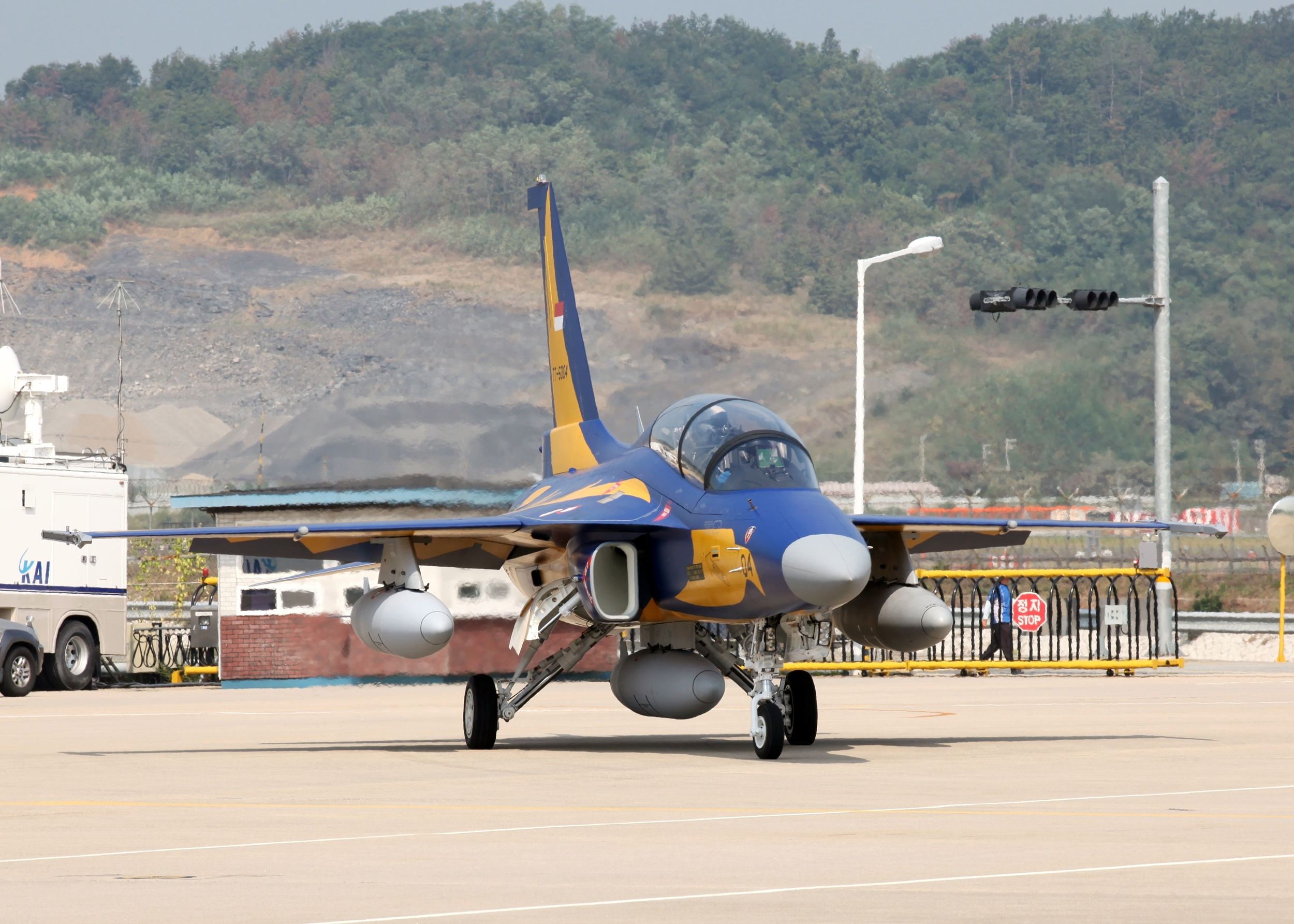
Indonesian Air Force T-50i

Indonesia had been considering the T-50, along with four other aircraft to replace its BAE Systems Hawk Mk 53 trainer and OV-10 Bronco attack aircraft. In August 2010, Indonesia announced that T-50, Yak-130 and L-159 were the remaining candidates for its requirement for 16 advanced jet trainers. In May 2011, Indonesia signed a US$400 million contract for 16 T-50s, designated T-50i. They feature weapons pylons and gun modules, enabling light attack capabilities. Deliveries began in September 2013; the last aircraft were delivered in January 2014.

In July 2021, KAI confirmed that it has been awarded a US$240 million contract to supply another batch of six T-50s along with a support and logistics package. Two aircraft was scheduled to be delivered in November 2025, with the rest to follow. The two aircraft was delivered by air cargo to Juanda International Airport, Surabaya in February 2026 and transported to the Iswahyudi Air Force Base using trucks.

=== Iraq ===
Iraq first publicly expressed official interest in the T-50 trainers during the Korea–Iraq summit in Seoul on 24 February 2009. In April 2010, Iraq reopened the jet lead-in fighter-trainer competition for 24 aircraft, in which TA-50 competed. In December 2013, Iraq signed a contract for 24 T-50IQ aircraft, a FA-50 variant, plus additional equipment and pilot training over the next 20 years. The first batch of aircraft was delivered in March 2017 while the second batch arrived in May 2018. However, none were flown until June 2022, following the negotiation of a maintenance, logistics and training contract with KAI in November 2021.

=== Philippines ===
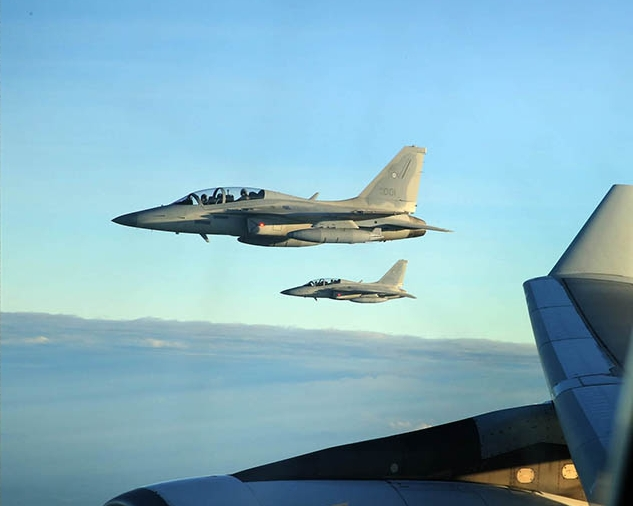
Philippine Air Force FA-50PHs escorting the plane carrying President Aquino

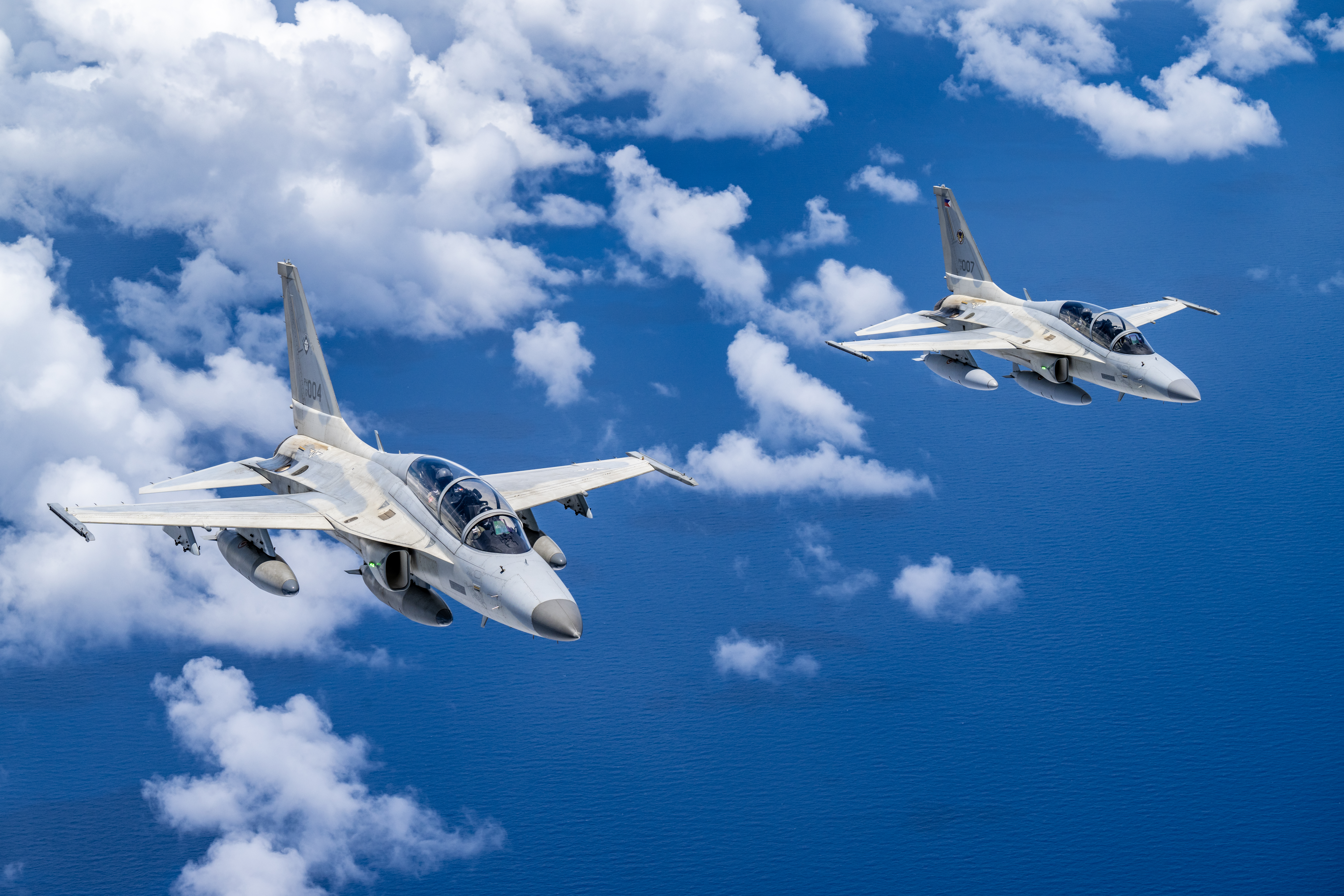
Two FA-50PHs conduct joint combined exchange training above Basa Air Force Base

Philippine Air Force FA-50PH carrying President Marcos Jr.

The Philippine Air Force (PAF) chose 12 TA-50s to fulfill its requirement for a light attack and lead-in fighter trainer aircraft. The Department of National Defense (DND) announced the selection of the type in August 2012. Funding for 12 aircraft was approved by Congress in September 2012.

In January 2013, state media reported that the FA-50 variant, not the TA-50 as previously reported, was selected for procurement. In October 2013, President Benigno Aquino III said that the DND was close to finalizing the FA-50 deal. On 19 October 2013, President Aquino and President Park Geun-hye of South Korea signed a memorandum of understanding (MoU) with provisions for acquisitions. On 13 February 2014, President Aquino approved the payment scheme and budget of P18.9 billion ($415.7 million) for 12 lead-in fighter trainers. On 28 March 2014, the DND signed a contract for 12 FA-50 fighters worth P18.9 billion (US$421.12 million).

Deliveries began in November 2015, all 12 aircraft were delivered by 31 May 2017. Plans were laid for 3 or 4 FA-50s to be fitted with capability for beyond visual range (BVR) intercept. In March 2015, Stockholm International Peace Research Institute (SIPRI) reported that the Philippines plans to order additional FA-50s, which is supported by the PAF Flight Plan 2028 that lists another 12 FA-50s planned for the future.

On 26 January 2017, two PAF FA-50PHs conducted a nighttime attack on terrorist hideouts in Butig, Lanao del Sur in Mindanao, the first combat sorties flown by these aircraft. In June 2017, FA-50s were deployed to conduct airstrikes against Maute terrorists entrenched in the city of Marawi starting in May 2017. On 12 July 2017, an FA-50 was involved in a friendly fire incident during the battle of Marawi, when a bomb landed approximately 250 meters off target, killing two Philippine soldiers and injuring 11 more. An investigation cleared the aircrew and aircraft of fault and the type was returned to active service in August.

In June 2018, the PAF was reportedly reviewing the possible acquisition of 12 more aircraft. PAF Chief Lt. Gen Connor Anthony Canlas Sr. reiterated this possibility in a media interview in June 2022.

On 2 February 2019, two PAF FA-50s dropped eight 250-pound bombs on a base of the ISIS-linked Bangsamoro Islamic Freedom Fighters (BIFF) in response to a bomb attack on the Our Lady of Mount Carmel Cathedral in Barangay Walled City, Jolo, Sulu.

On 25 June 2020, in relation to its 73rd founding anniversary, the PAF conducted a live fire exercise off the coast of Palawan, performing the first live-firing of an AGM-65G2 Maverick missile from a FA-50PH at a floating target to demonstrate its anti-ship capabilities.

On 25 December 2020, one day before the 52nd anniversary of the Communist Party of the Philippines, a PAF FA-50 dropped six bombs, including a GPS-guided bomb, that resulted in the deaths of three New People's Army rebels at their base camp in Daguma Mountain Range in Sultan Kudarat province.

On 26 April 2023, as part of the 2023 Balikatan Exercises, a PAF FA-50PH took part in the sinking of target ship ex-BRP Pangasinan as part of SINKEX (Sinking Exercise) under BALIKATAN Exercises, firing a single AGM-65G2 Maverick missile.

On 4 March 2025, a PAF FA-50 and its two pilots had lost contact and went missing during a night tactical mission against communist insurgency in the southern Philippines. The plane was found the day after, which crashed on Mount Kalatungan, in the southern province of Bukidnon. Both pilots were found dead.

On 25 March 2025, Philippine Chief of Staff Gen. Romeo Brawner Jr. honored Filipino heroes of the Korean War during his visit to the War Memorial of Korea. Impressed by the FA-50's capabilities, he reaffirmed plans to expand the fleet with 12 additional jets.

On 8 April 2025, Colonel Ma. Consuelo Castillo of the Philippine Air Force (PAF) clarified that the fatal FA-50 crash in Bukidnon was not caused by technical or mechanical failure. The PAF's investigation identified a combination of factors, including the inherent risks of night flying over mountainous terrain, limited visibility, challenging wind conditions, and the complexity of multi-aircraft combat operations requiring flawless coordination. Castillo emphasized the PAF's commitment to improving safety protocols, mission planning, and inter-service coordination to prevent similar incidents in future air support operations.

=== Thailand ===
In September 2015, the Thai government chose the T-50TH for its air force over the Chinese Hongdu L-15 to replace its aging L-39 Albatros trainers. The four T-50THs were scheduled to be delivered by March 2018. In July 2017, Thailand's government approved the procurement of eight more aircraft Deliveries began in January 2018. The Royal Thai Air Force's (RTA) 2024 White Paper outlines a plan to acquire two more T-50TH aircraft in the fiscal year 2025. This acquisition will bring the total number of aircraft in squadron 401 to 16.

On 24 December 2025, during 2025 Cambodia–Thailand conflict, the RTA deployed its T-50TH in a live combat mission for the first time, conducting a deep-strike mission over Battambang province and dropping four bombs on a target in Banan District. The T-50TH operated alongside F-16s and Gripens as part of coordinated air operations.

=== Poland ===
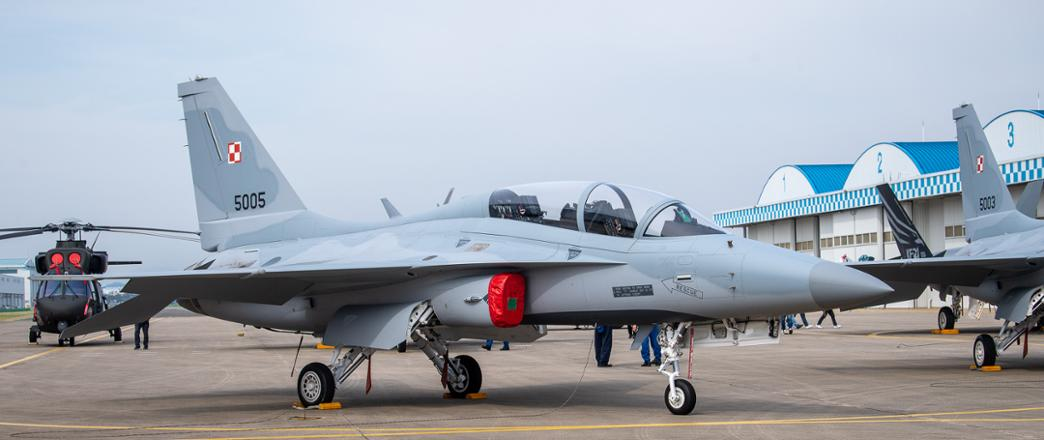
A Polish FA-50PL

On 22 July 2022, Poland's Defense Minister Mariusz Błaszczak said in a media interview that the country would buy 48 FA-50 fighters; KAI officially signed the deal with the Polish government for 12 FA-50GF (Gap Filler) Block 10 and 36 FA-50PL (Polish Version) Block 20 shortly after (28 July). with deliveries to start in 2023 Błaszczak said KAI's ability to deliver the aircraft quickly was the decisive selection factor. As a result of the 2022 Russian invasion of Ukraine, the Polish Air Force desired urgently to replace their remaining MiG-29 fighter and Su-22 attack aircraft and the U.S. was unable to supply additional F-16s in such a short timeframe. KAI was also expected to help establish a servicing center for the aircraft in Poland in cooperation with Polish defense industries by 2026.

As is common practice in military aviation procurement, the contract for the FA-50PL, a variant designed to meet specific Polish requirements, was signed while the version was still in development (a similar situation occurred with Poland's order for the F-35A Block 4 TR-3, which then faced developmental delays). Many of these requirements, such as the integration of Sniper targeting pods, GBU-12 bombs, and KGGB guided bombs, as well as an in-flight refueling probe, had already been tested and integrated on the FA-50 platform. Other planned integrations for the FA-50PL, such as the Phantom Strike AESA radar and Link-16 datalink, were considered challenging primarily from a timing perspective, but not technically unfeasible.

The FA-50PL was intended to be integrated with modern air-to-air missiles like the AIM-9X Sidewinder and the AIM-120 AMRAAM. The contract covered the cost of most integrations for the FA-50PL variant. However, the integration of the AIM-120 AMRAAM in particular would require an additional agreement. Poland conducted talks with manufacturers of alternative missiles, as a "Plan B". For training purposes, Poland was to lease AIM-9P4 missiles from South Korea, allowing Poland to use the missiles for training and then return them and avoiding future disposal costs once the more advanced AIM-9X was integrated. Separately, Poland purchased 24 upgraded AIM-9L/I-1 missiles, which are modernized versions of the AIM-9L.

The FA-50 is a light combat aircraft with a size similar to the F-16, though slightly shorter, and with more limited combat capabilities. The FA-50's role in training can be compared to that of the M-346 AJT: while the M-346 can simulate a wider range of virtual weaponry, the M-346 is more expensive to operate than the FA-50; unlike the base model of the M-346, the FA-50 can also be used for training with real targets and has inherent combat capabilities.

=== Malaysia ===
On 24 February 2023, KAI announced the signing of a $920 million deal with the Malaysian Ministry of Defence for the purchase of 18 FA-50 Block 20 for the Royal Malaysian Air Force's light combat aircraft (LCA) and fighter lead-in trainer (FLIT) tender, which is intended to replace the Aermacchi MB-339 and Hawk Mk 108/208 currently in service. The FA-50 was in competition with the Indian HAL Tejas, Italian Alenia Aermacchi M-346 Master, Turkish TAI Hürjet, Chinese Hongdu L-15, Russian Mikoyan MiG-35, and Sino-Pakistani JF-17 Thunder. On 23 May 2023, Malaysia signed a $920 million final contract with KAI to purchase 18 FA-50 Block 20s. KAI officials said Malaysia is willing to order 18 more FA-50s later. On 30 October 2026, the first FA-50M Block 20 jet landed at RMAF Labuan Air Base, after having flown from South Korea via the Philippines. In a press statement, Defence Minister Mohamed Khaled Nordin announced six more FA-50M aircraft are to arrive by April 2027, with all 18 units scheduled for delivery by March 2028.

=== Potential future operators ===
In May 2026, the United Kingdom is considering a replacement for its fast jet trainer programme with the BAE Systems Hawk set for retirement. Press reporting indicates that the KAI T-50 Golden Eagle is one of the options under consideration, along with the Boeing–Saab T-7 Red Hawk, Leonardo M-346 and TAI Hürjet.

== Variants ==
=== Current variants ===
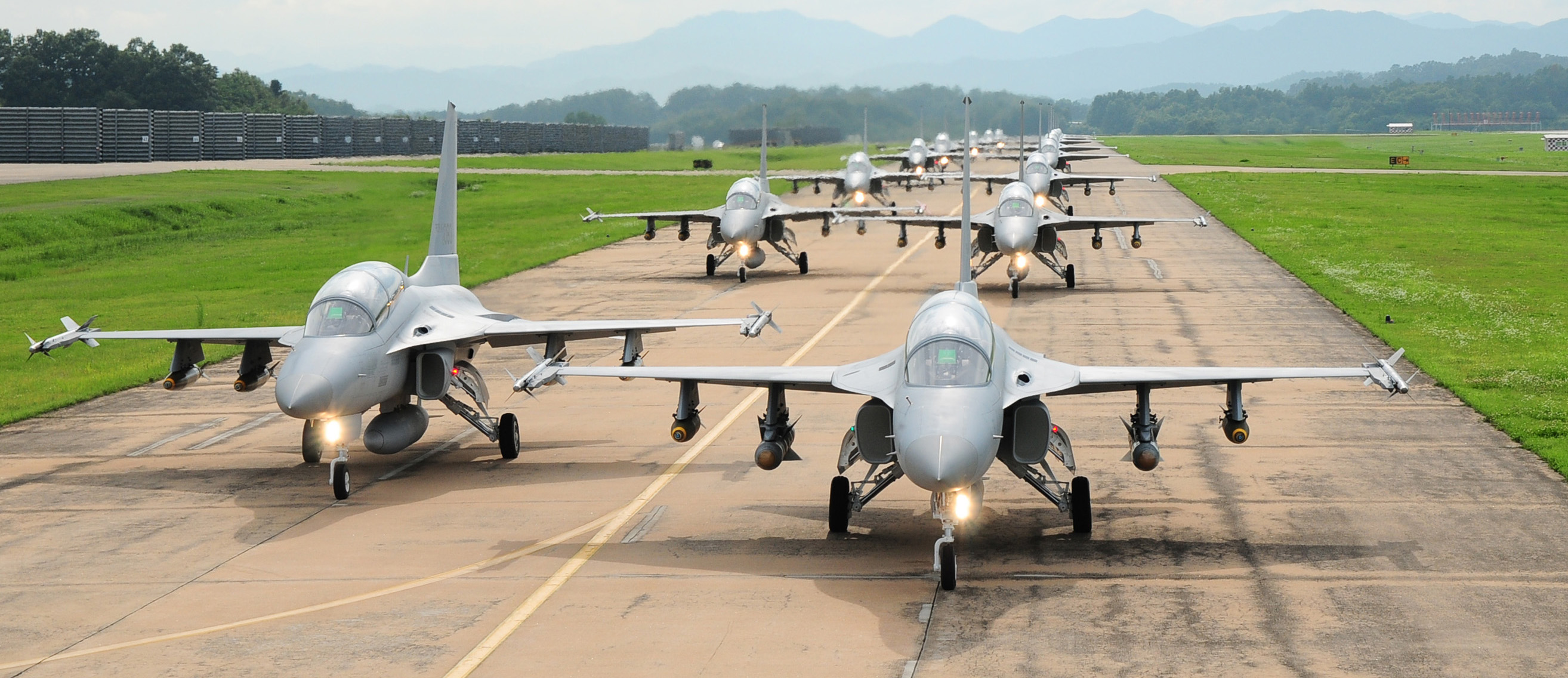
TA-50 group display at ROKAF air base

- T-50 Golden Eagle: Advanced trainer version.
  - T-50B: Aerobatic-specialized T-50 version. Used by ROKAF's aerobatic display team, the Black Eagles.
  - TA-50: Lead-in fighter trainer and light attack version.
  - TF-50: A variant of the T-50 trainer platform that is uniquely configured as an advanced trainer and light attack fighter. It has modern capabilities to meet multiple missions and get new pilots flying operational sorties faster. Lockheed Martin is offering the TF-50 as an effective, low-risk, scalable solution that is ready to meet multiple advanced training needs around the world.
- FA-50 Fighting Eagle: Light fighter/attack version, originally named A-50. A prototype from a converted T-50 first flew in 2011.
  - FA-50 Block 10: Software upgrades to enable integration of Lockheed Martin AN/AAQ-33 Sniper targeting pod.
    - FA-50 Block 40: Baseline FA-50 configuration.
    - FA-50 Block 50: Equipped with a Link 16 data link, fire detection system, radar warning receiver (RWR), countermeasures dispensing system, Sniper Advanced Targeting Pod, and compatibility with laser-guided bombs such as GBU-12 Paveway II, JDAM.
  - FA-50 Block 20: An upgraded variant incorporating a range of enhancements intended to expand its operational capabilities. While specific configurations may vary depending on the requirements of individual operators several key features are common across planned versions. These include the integration of a telescopic aerial refueling probe developed by Cobham Mission Systems, 1,100-litre (300 US gal) conformal fuel tanks to extend range, and an active electronically scanned array (AESA) radar. Additional upgrades encompass improved avionics, a helmet-mounted display (HMD), and compatibility with a wider array of munitions. These include laser-guided bombs such as the GBU-12, advanced short-range air-to-air missiles, as well as medium- to long-range air-to-air missiles. While these capabilities have been outlined in development plans, the final implementation may differ based on political and logistical considerations for each customer nation.
    - FA-50 Block 60: Enhances mission endurance and range with 300-gallon conformal fuel tanks (CFT) and air-to-air refueling (AAR) capability.
    - FA-50 Block 70: Upgraded for advanced air-to-air combat with dual AESA surveillance and fire control radar, compatibility with AIM-9X high off-boresight missiles supported by a Head-Mounted Display (HMD), and AIM-120 AMRAAM for beyond-visual-range (BVR) engagements.
- F-50: The F-50 is a proposed single-seat multirole fighter variant of FA-50. In 2016 it was cancelled in favor of the KAI KF-21. In 2024, KAI announced that it had resumed working on the project again. KAI is developing an F-50 upgrade kit, a single-seat conversion for the FA-50, at the request of an unnamed nation. This kit involves removing the rear pilot's seat and cockpit, creating space for an additional fuel tank and new electronics. This modification is expected to significantly increase the aircraft's operational range by 20% to 30% and boost its weapon payload capacity, making it a more capable and formidable platform. KAI plans to have a prototype ready by 2026, with the final version available by 2028.

=== Country-specific variants ===
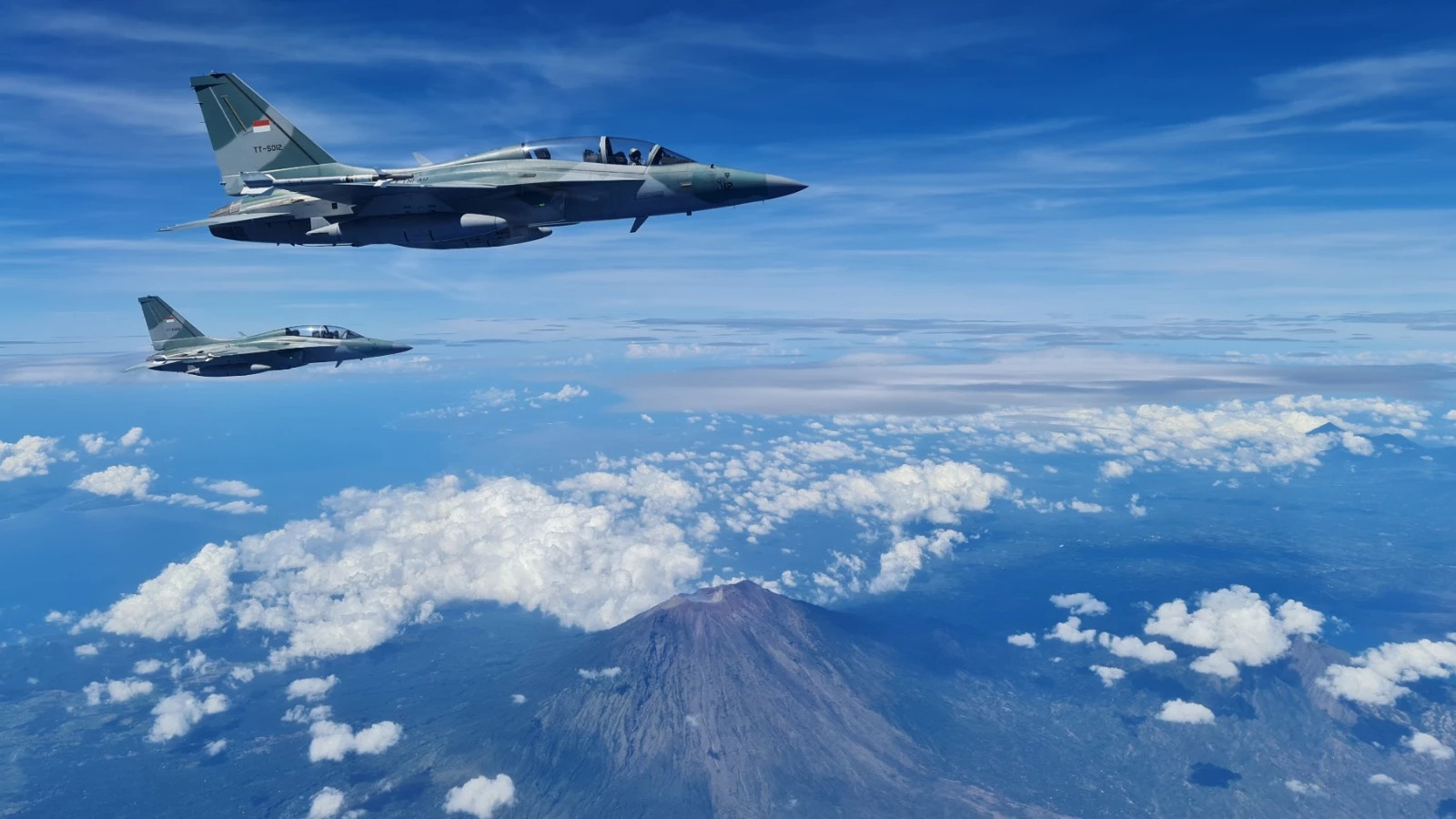
Indonesian Air Force T-50i of the 15th Air Squadron carrying AIM-9P

Indonesia

- T-50i: Version of the T-50 for Indonesian Air Force

Iraq

- T-50IQ: Version of the FA-50 for Iraqi Air Force The aircraft can operate AIM-9 Sidewinder and JDAM.

Malaysia

- FA-50M: Version of the FA-50 Block 70 for the Royal Malaysian Air Force

Philippines

- FA-50PH: Version of the FA-50 Block 50 for the Philippine Air Force

Poland

- FA-50GF: Version of the FA-50 Block 50 for the Polish Air Force
- FA-50PL: Version of the FA-50 Block 70 for the Polish Air Force

Thailand

- T-50TH: Version of the T-50 for the Royal Thai Air Force, with some FA-50/TA-50 equipment and capability such as EL/M-2032 radar, MIL-STD-1760 interface, 20 mm gun, radar warning receiver, and countermeasures dispenser system. Compatible with laser-guided bombs, AIM-9 Sidewinder and AGM-65 Maverick, integration for beyond-visual-range missile Locally designated B.KhF.2 (Thai: บ.ขฝ.๒).

United States

- T-50A: Failed candidate for the US Air Force T-X program, based on the FA-50.
- TF-50A: Candidate for the US Air Force Advanced Tactical Trainer program, based on the FA-50.
- TF-50N: Candidate for the US Navy Tactical Surrogate Aircraft program and the Undergraduate Jet Training System program, based on the FA-50.

== Operators ==
=== Current operators ===
Map with operators of T-50 or its variants

Indonesia

- Indonesian Air Force – 16 T-50i trainers were delivered by January 2014. These were fitted with EL/M-2032 radars and cannons in 2018. 13 aircraft are in service as of August 2023. In July 2021, Indonesia signed a contract for a further six planes at a cost of US$240 million with initial planned delivery by October 2024. Two were delivered in February 2026. Four were delivered by July 2026.

Iraq

- Iraqi Air Force – 24 T-50IQ light fighters were delivered by November 2019.

Malaysia

- Royal Malaysian Air Force – 18 units of FA-50M Block 70 on order. First aircraft was delivered in October 2026.

Philippines

- Philippine Air Force – 12 FA-50PH Block 50 light fighters were delivered by May 2017. 11 aircraft are in service as of March 2025. All 11 FA-50 Block 50 are currently being upgraded to Block 60, and Block 70 upgrade in the pipeline. 12 additional FA-50PH Block 70 units on order.

Poland

- Polish Air Force – 12 FA-50GF Block 50 and 36 FA-50PL Block 70 on order.

South Korea

- Republic of Korea Air Force – 50 T-50s, 10 T-50Bs, 22 TA-50s, and 60 FA-50s (142 total) aircraft in service as of October 2016.

Thailand

- Royal Thai Air Force – 14 T-50TH trainers ordered in total. The first four aircraft were delivered in April 2018. Additional 2 FA-50THs ordered.

=== Summary ===
Operators	Orders	Acquisition				Losses	In service	Note
Operators	Orders	T-50; T-50B	TA-50	FA-50		Losses	In service	Note
Operators	Orders	T-50; T-50B	TA-50	Block 10 (40/50)	Block 20 (60/70)	Losses	In service	Note
(Indonesia) Indonesian Air Force	T-50i; 22	22	—	—	—	3	19	Batch I: 16 T-50. Batch II: 6 T-50.
(Iraq) Iraqi Air Force	T-50IQ; 24	—	—	24	—	—	24	Batch I: 24 FA-50 Blk 50.
(Malaysia) Royal Malaysian Air Force	FA-50M; 18	—	—	—	2 (+16)	—	2	Batch I: 18 FA-50 Blk 70.
(Philippines) Philippine Air Force	FA-50PH; 24	—	—	12 (−11)	(+12) (+11)	1	11	Batch I: 12 FA-50 Blk 40, 11 units upgraded to Blk 50, completed. Upgrade to Blk 60 in-progress. Blk 70 upgrade on pipeline. Batch II: 12 FA-50 Blk 70.
(Poland) Polish Air Force	FA-50GF; 12 FA-50PL; 36	—	—	12 (−12)	(+36) (+12)	—	12	Batch I: 12 FA-50 Blk 50, upgrade to Blk 70 planned. Batch II: 36 FA-50 Blk 70.
(South Korea) Republic of Korea Air Force	T-50; 50 T-50B; 10 TA-50; 22 FA-50; 60	60	22	60	—	3	139	Batch I: 20 FA-50 Blk 40, upgraded to Blk 50. Batch II: 40 FA-50 Blk 50.
(Thailand) Royal Thai Air Force	T-50TH; 14	10	—	4	—	—	14	Batch I: 4 T-50. Batch II: 8 T-50. Batch III: 2 T-50 upgraded to FA-50 Blk 50. Batch IV: 2 FA-50 Blk 50.
In service	Total orders 292	92	22	112	0	7	219	
In service	Total orders 292	Total acquired: 222 To be manufactured: 70				7	219	

Legend of the colored numbers in the table

Systems assembled and produced in South Korea
Systems assembled or produced outside of South Korea
2nd hand sold/transferred [ – ] and bought/received [ + ]
System upgraded, one variant to the other [ – ] / [ + ]

== Accidents and incidents ==
- On 15 November 2012, a South Korean air force pilot from the Black Eagles aerobatic display team was killed when his T-50B crashed in the mountains of Hoengsong, about 48 nm (90 km) east of Seoul, due to human error during a maintenance operation.
- On 20 December 2015, an Indonesian Air Force T-50i crashed while performing a demonstration during an airshow at Adisutjipto Air Base in Yogyakarta, killing its two pilots, possibly caused by pilot error.
- On 10 August 2020, an Indonesian Air Force T-50i pilot died from injuries sustained during a training accident at the Iswahyudi Air Force Base.
- On 19 July 2022, an Indonesian Air Force T-50i crashed in Central Java during a nighttime training mission, killing its pilot.
- On 4 March 2025, a Philippine Air Force FA-50PH with two pilots crashed into Mount Kalatungan in Bukidnon during an operation against the New People's Army, killing two of its pilots.

== Specifications (T-50) ==
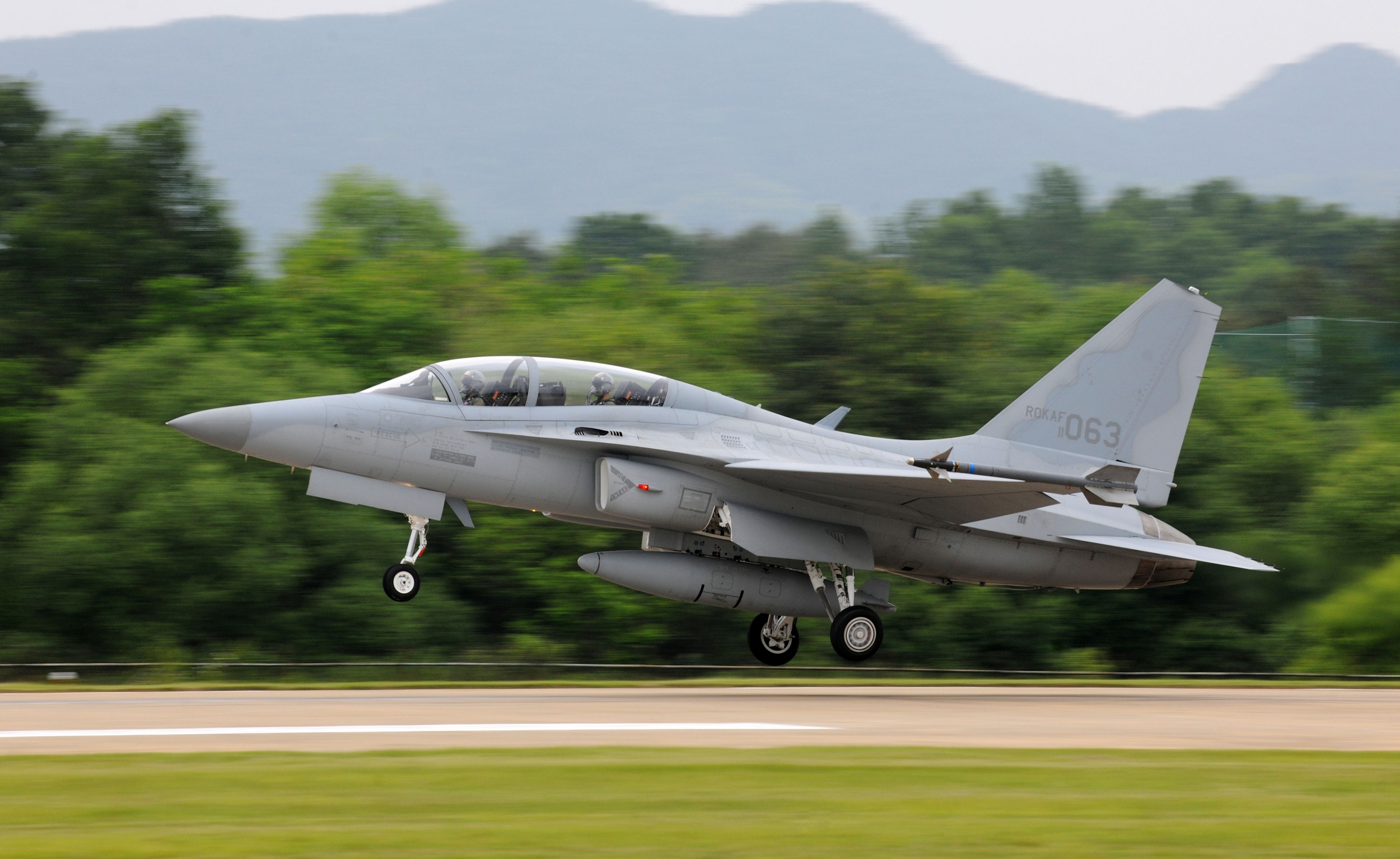
FA-50 Fighting Eagle

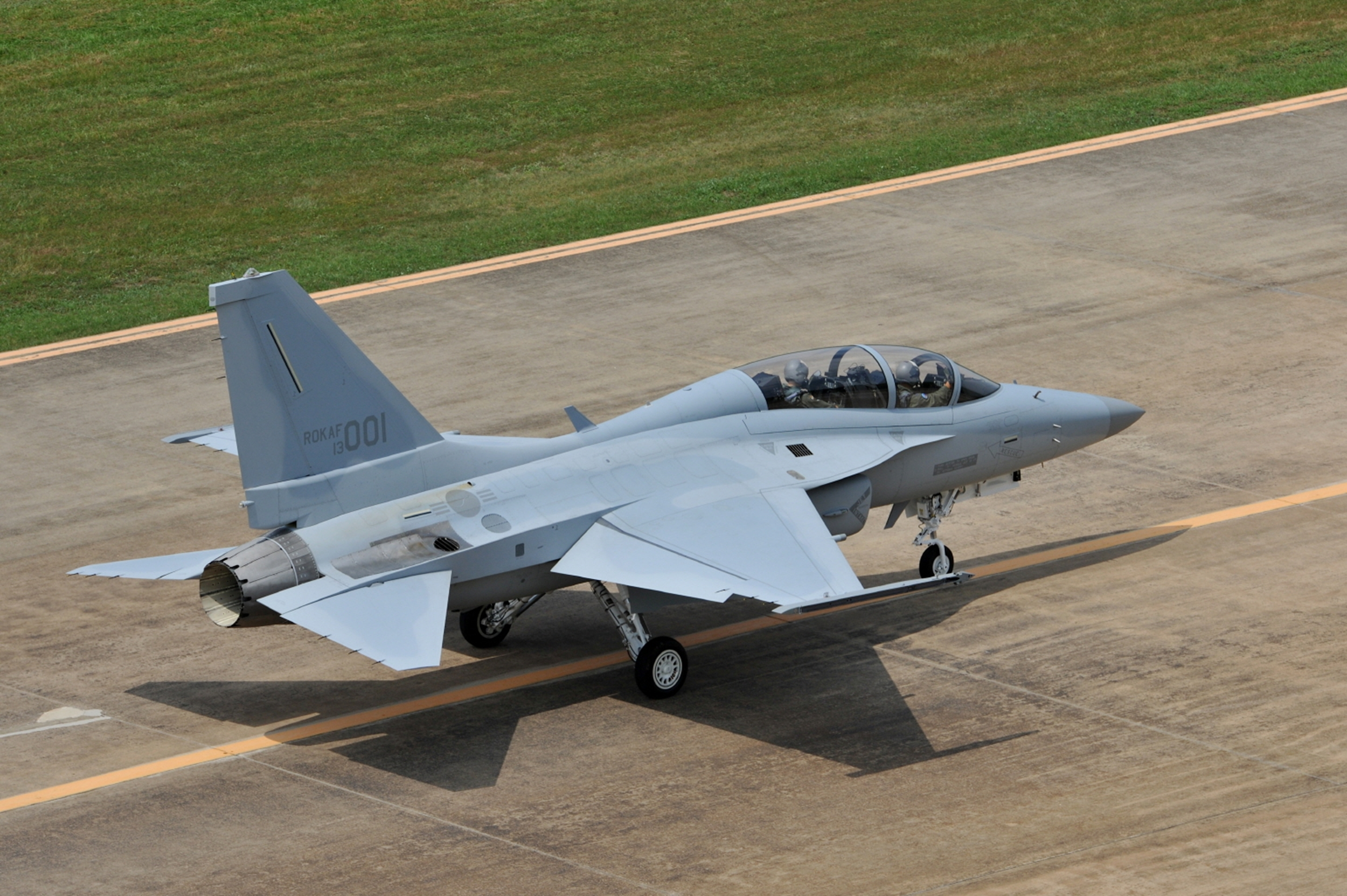
FA-50 landing for ROKAF's first delivery

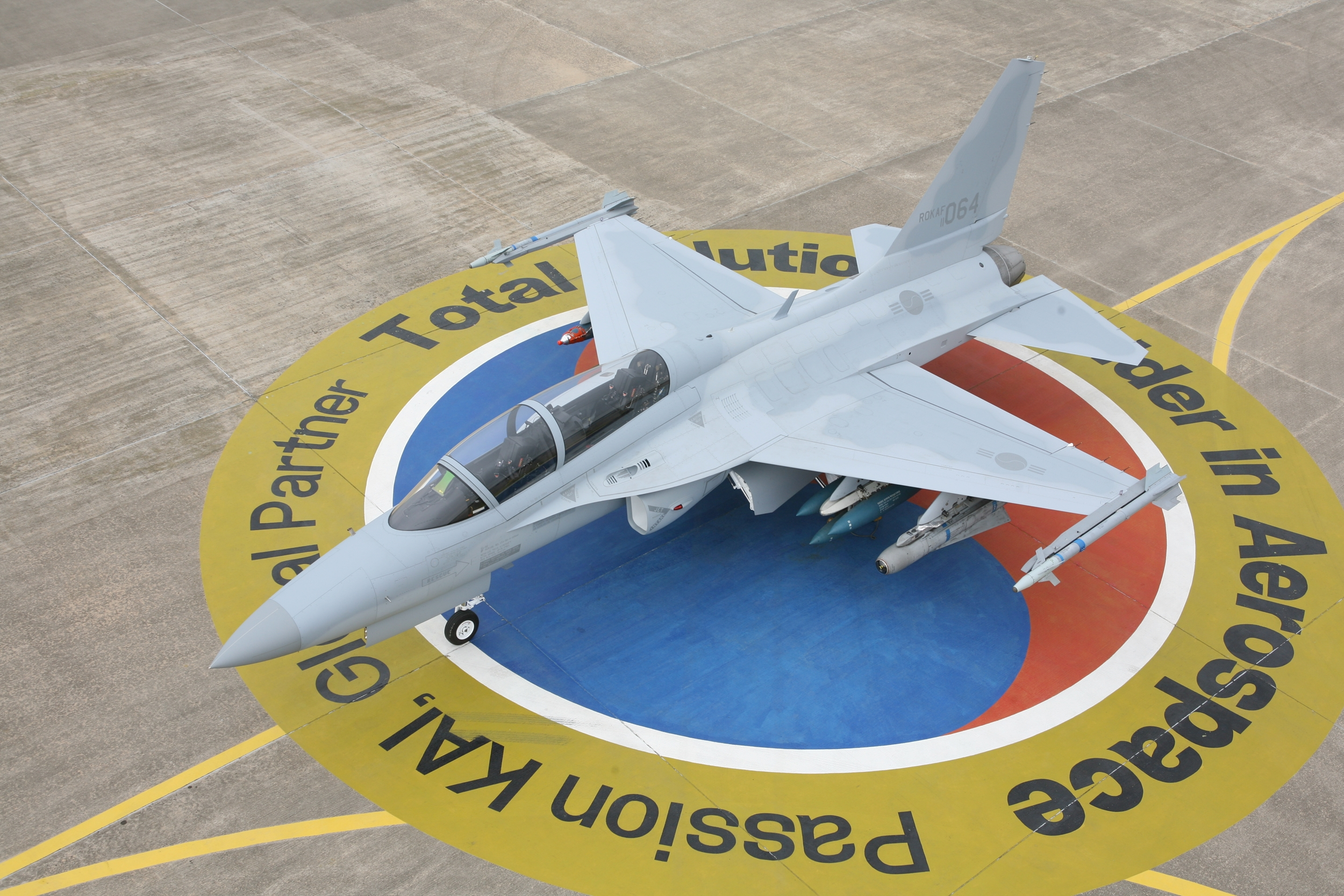
TA-50 Lead in Fighter Trainer at KAI

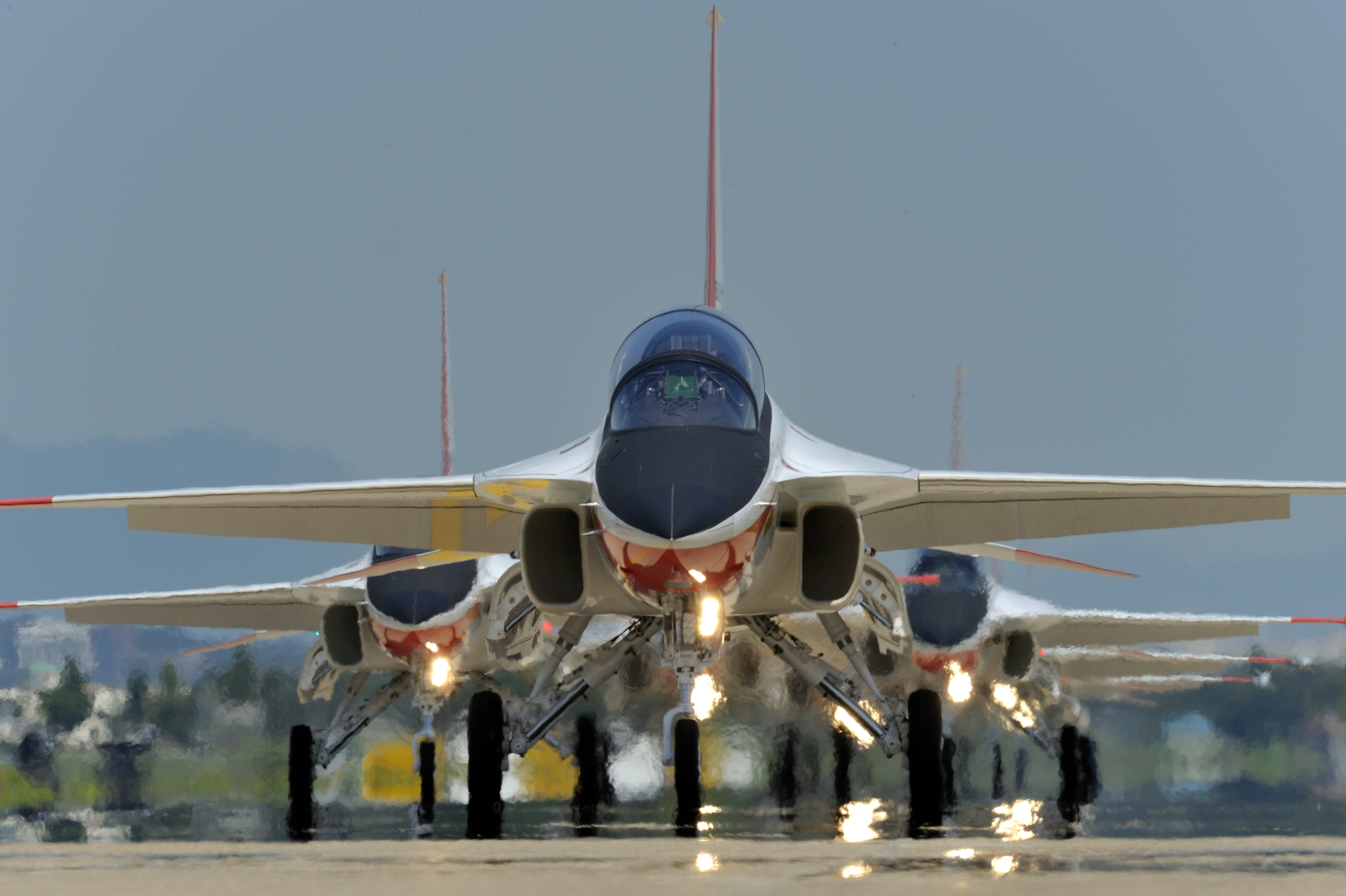
T-50 Golden Eagles lining up

Data from Korea Aerospace Industries

General characteristics

- Crew: 2
- Length: 13.14 m (43 ft 1 in)
- Wingspan: 9.45 m (31 ft 0 in) with wingtip missiles
- Height: 4.82 m (15 ft 8 in)
- Wing area: 23.69 m^{2} (255.0 sq ft)
- Empty weight: 6,470 kg (14,285 lb)
- Max takeoff weight: 10,722 kg (23,638 lb)
- Fuel capacity: 2,655 liters (701 U.S. gal) internal
- Powerplant: 1 × General Electric F404-GE-102 afterburning turbofan engine (built under license by Samsung Techwin), 53.07 kN (11,930 lbf) thrust dry, 78.7 kN (17,700 lbf) with afterburner

Performance

- Maximum speed: 1,840 km/h (1,140 mph, 990 kn) at 9,150 m (30,000 ft)
- Maximum speed: Mach 1.5
- Range: 1,851 km (1,150 mi, 999 nmi)
- Service ceiling: 14,630 m (48,000 ft)
- g limits: +8 −3
- Rate of climb: 198 m/s (39,000 ft/min)
- Thrust/weight: 0.96

Note: armament for TA-50 and FA-50 only.

Armament

- Guns: 1× General Dynamics M197 20mm (0.787 in) 3-barrel rotary electric cannon, 205 rounds
- Hardpoints: Total of 7 with 4 underwing, 2 wingtip and one under fuselage; holding up to 5,400 kg (12,000 lb) of payload
- Missiles:
  - Air-to-air missiles:
    - AIM-9L/M Sidewinder
    - AIM-9X Sidewinder (Block 70)
    - AIM-120 AMRAAM (Block 70)
  - Air-to-ground missiles:
    - AGM-65 Maverick
- Bombs:
  - GBU-38 Joint Direct Attack Munition
  - GBU-12 Paveway II
  - KGGB
  - Mark 82 bomb
  - CBU-105 WCMD Sensor Fuzed Weapon
  - CBU-58
  - SUU-20 Dispenser
- Others:
  - Sniper Advanced Targeting Pod

Avionics

- Lockheed Martin AN/APG-67 (T-50IQ)
- Elta EL/M-2032 (TA-50 and FA-50 Block 50)
- Raytheon PhantomStrike AESA radar (FA-50 Block 70)
- LIG Nex1 ESR-500A AESA radar (Option for FA-50 Block 70)

=== Variant specifications ===
	FA-50 Block 10	TA-50	T-50B
Length	13.14 m (43 ft 1 in)		
Wingspan	9.45 m (31 ft 0 in)		
Height	4.82 m (15 ft 8 in)		
Wing area	23.69 m2 (255.0 sq ft)		
Empty weight	6,454 kg (14,229 lb)		
Max takeoff weight	12,215 kg (26,929 lb)	12,223 kg (26,947 lb)	10,722 kg (23,638 lb)
Internal fuel	2.5 t (2.5 long tons; 2.8 short tons)		
External fuel	3x 150 US gal (120 imp gal; 570 L)		
Range	1,851 km (1,150 mi, 1,000 nmi)		
Combat range	444 km (276 mi, 230 nmi)		
Ferry range	2,592 km (1,611 mi, 1,400 nmi)		
Service ceiling	16,764 m (55,000 ft)		
g limits	+8.3 / −3		

== See also ==
Related development

- General Dynamics F-16 Fighting Falcon

Aircraft of comparable role, configuration, and era

- Aero L-159 ALCA
- AIDC T-5 Brave Eagle
- Alenia Aermacchi M-346 Master
- Boeing–Saab T-7 Red Hawk
- Guizhou JL-9
- HAL Tejas
- Hongdu JL-10
- TAI Hürjet
- Yakovlev Yak-130
