= AN/APQ-159 =

Northrop F-5 fighter fire-control radar

The Emerson Electric AN/APQ-159 was an I band/J band radar designed to upgrade Emerson's simple AN/APQ-153 used in the Northrop F-5. It offered roughly double the range, increased off-boresight tracking angles, and considerably improved reliability. Originally intended to be replaced by the further improved AN/APQ-167, modernized F-5s have typically moved to the entirely new AN/APG-69 instead.

Like the earlier APQ-153, the APQ-159 was a purely air-to-air radar system. It had four primary modes of operation, two search modes with different ranges using a simple B-Scope display, a C-Scope gunnery display with ranging and automatic lock-on ("dogfight mode"), and a similar mode used with the AIM-9 Sidewinder that calculated the missile's engagement envelope and provided cues to the pilot to fly into the envelope. The radar offered no air-to-ground modes at all, nor was it capable of firing the AIM-7 Sparrow in spite of its BVR-capable range.

The APQ-159's primary upgrade was the addition of a new planar phased array antenna, replacing the -153's parabolic dish. This made the antenna smaller front-to-back which allowed it to be pointed to higher angles within the nose. It also greatly reduced the sidelobes, which improved gain and allowed the range to be greatly increased from the -153's roughly 20 nautical miles (37 km) to the -159's 40 nautical miles (74 km). The electronics were also upgraded, offering increased frequency agility and dramatically improving mean time between failure (MTBF) from about 62 hours in the -153 to 125 in the latest models of the -159, which have actually demonstrated 150 hours MTBF in the field.

Several versions of the APQ-159 were built over its lifetime. It was initially offered in four separate models with the same radar electronics, but different displays. The APQ-159-1 and -2 models used a display that could operate in television mode to operate the AGM-65 Maverick air-to-ground missile, while the -3 and -4 lacked this capability. The -1 and -3 models had a single display, while the -2 and -4's had dual displays for use in the two seater F-5F. The APQ-159-5 version was a product improvement that further improved reliability and reduced weight to the same as the original APQ-153, making in-field upgrades much simpler. The final version was the APQ-159-7.

Technologies of AN/APQ-159 have been adopted for another radar, the AN/APQ-167. This is similar to the dual-display AN/APQ-159, which thus is essentially the AN/APQ-159 equivalent of AN/APQ-157. However, the new radar was not adopted by foreign customers originally targeted, and instead, it is used on Cessna T-47A Citation by USAF for radar operator training.

In accordance with the Joint Electronics Type Designation System (JETDS), the "AN/APQ-159" designation represents the 159th design of an Army-Navy airborne electronic device for radar special equipment. The JETDS system also now is used to name all Department of Defense electronic systems.

== See also ==
- List of radars
- List of military electronics of the United States
