= AN/APQ-153 =

I band fire-control radar developed for Northrop F-5E fighter aircraft

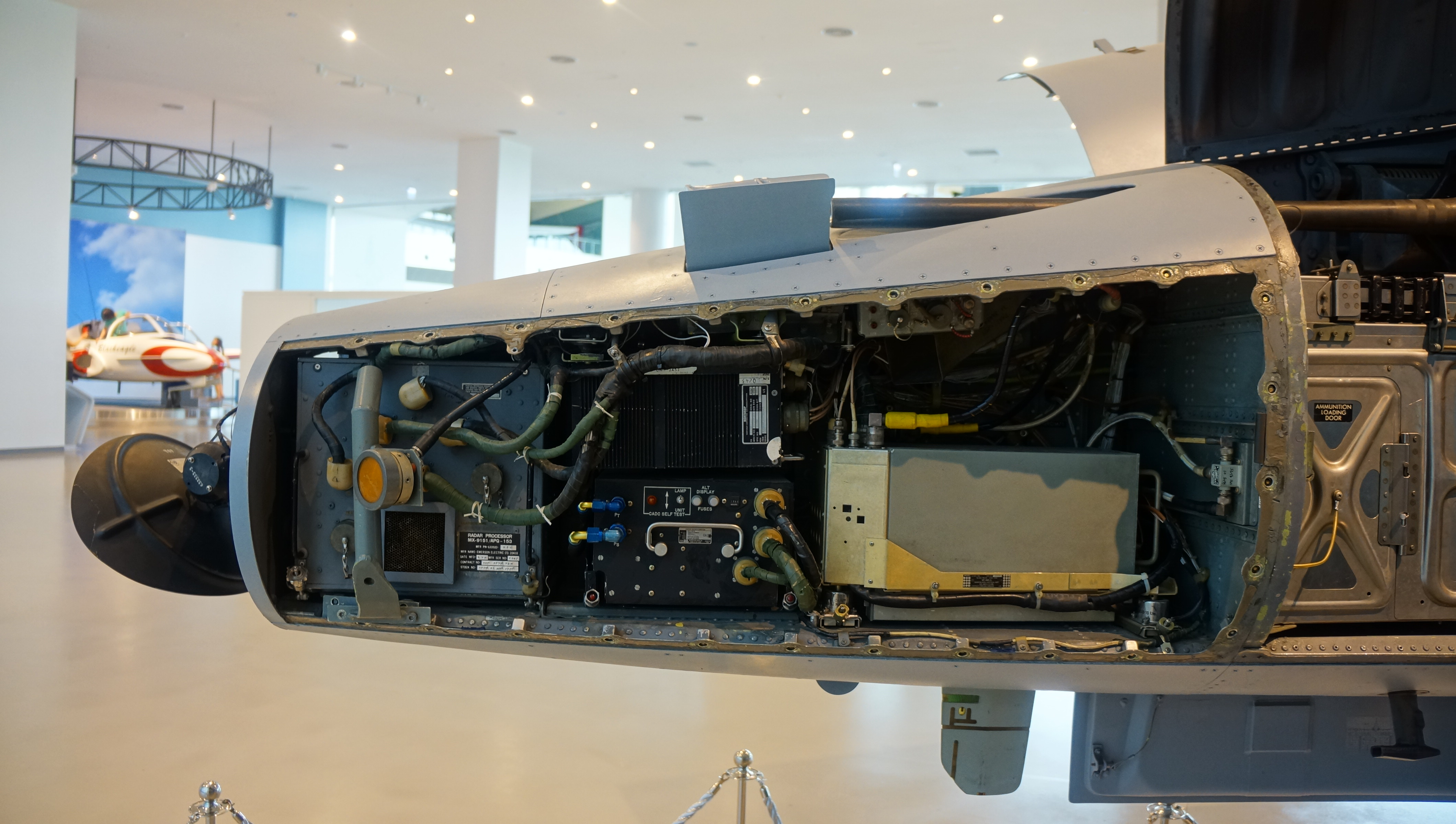
AN/APQ-153 displayed at Jeju Aerospace Museum

The Emerson Electric AN/APQ-153 was an I band radar system developed for the Northrop F-5E fighter aircraft. Required to fit into the tight confines of the originally radar-less F-5, the system offered relatively simple air-to-air modes and a short detection range. The AN/APQ-157 was a similar system with dual displays and controls for the twin-seat F-5F trainer. Many of the F-5s still flying have been upgraded to the improved AN/APQ-159.

The APQ-153 was a relatively simple Pulse-Doppler radar intended to improve gunnery on the F-5. It offered four modes of operation; AA1 and AA2 air-to-air target search at different ranges, "dogfight" which locked onto the closest target and offered ranging and gun cueing, and finally a missile bore-sight cueing mode that calculated the engagement envelope of the AIM-9 Sidewinder and gave the pilot directional cues to help them fly into the envelope.

The antenna was necessarily small, a 12 by 16 inches (30 cm × 41 cm) parabolic dish that was stabilized to account for maneuvering. This was connected to a small 5-inch (13 cm) B-Scope display in the cockpit.

In accordance with the Joint Electronics Type Designation System (JETDS), the "AN/APQ-153" designation represents the 153rd design of an Army-Navy airborne electronic device for radar special equipment. The JETDS system also now is used to name all Department of Defense electronic systems.

== See also ==
- List of radars
- List of military electronics of the United States
