= CBU-97 Sensor Fuzed Weapon =

Anti-vehicle "smart" cluster bomb

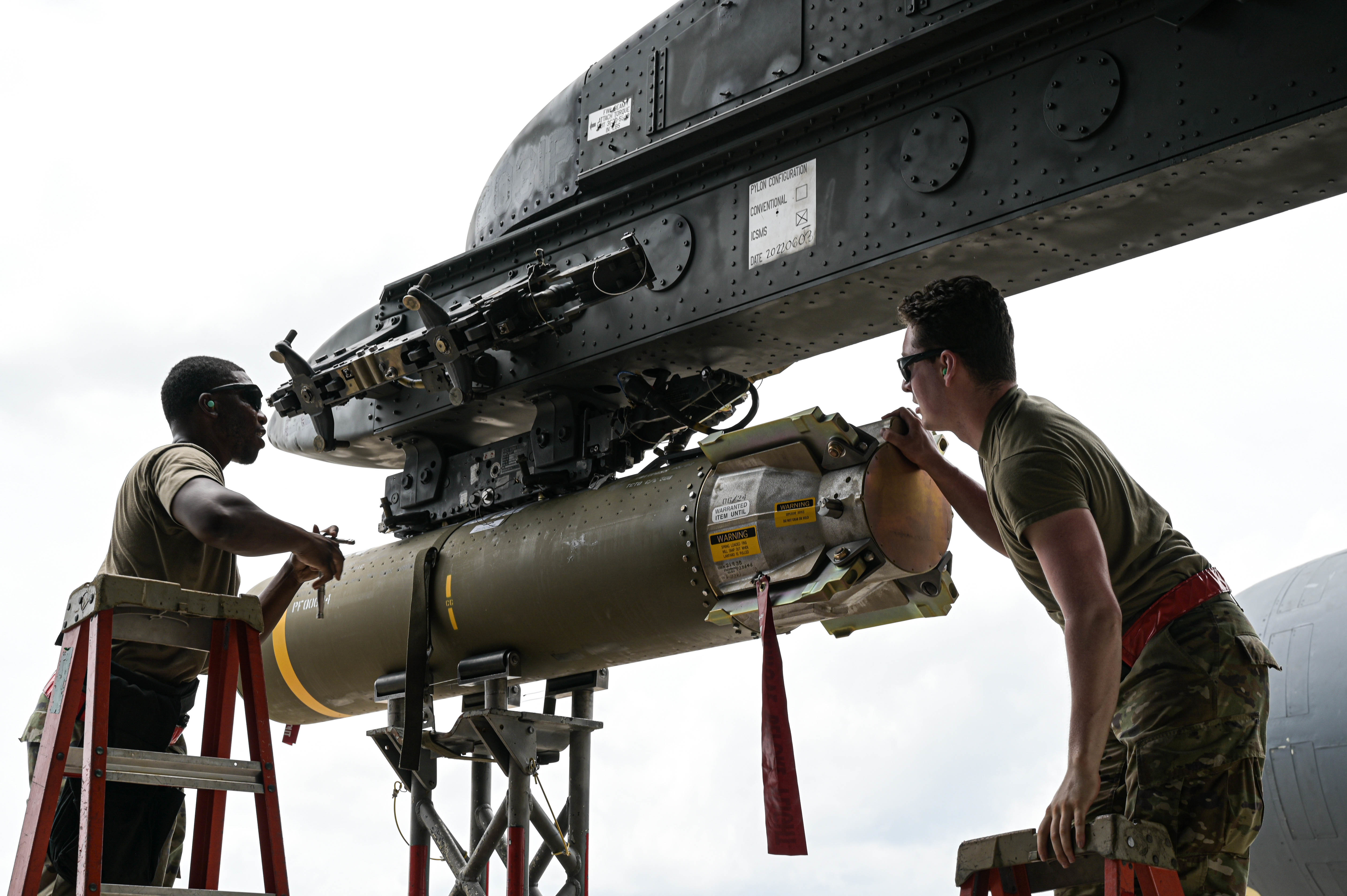
- A CBU-105 munition is loaded to a B-52H Stratofortress
- Type: Cluster bomb unit
- Place of origin: United States

Service history
- In service: Since 1993 (CBU-97); Since early 2010s (CBU-105)
- Used by: United States; India; Oman; Saudi Arabia; South Korea; Turkey
- Wars: Operation Iraqi Freedom

Production history
- Designer: Textron Systems
- Variants: CBU-105

Specifications
- Mass: 941 lb (427 kg)
- Length: 7 ft 8 in (2.34 m)
- Diameter: 16 in (400 mm)
- Tailspan: 1 ft 8 in (.52 m) stowed 3 ft 6 in (1.07 m) extended
- Warhead: 10 x BLU-108/B submunitions (CBU-97); 10 x BLU‐108B/B submunitions (CBU-105)
- Launch platform: F-16, A-10, F-15E, F-111, B-52H, B-1B, SEPECAT Jaguar
- References: Janes

BLU-108/B
- Type: Cluster bomb submunition
- Place of origin: United States

Production history
- Designer: Textron Systems
- Variants: BLU-108B/B

Specifications
- Mass: 64 lb (29 kg)
- Length: 2 ft 7 in (.8 m)
- Diameter: 3.9 in (100 mm)
- Warhead: 4 penetration skeet (4.6 in × 3.5 in (118 mm × 90 mm)), single slug explosively formed penetrator
- Guidance system: Passive IR (BLU-108/B); Passive IR/Active laser (BLU‐108B/B)
- References: Janes

The CBU-97 Sensor Fuzed Weapon is a United States Air Force 1,000-pound (450 kg)-class freefall Cluster Bomb Unit. It was developed and produced by Textron Defense Systems. A CBU-97 used in conjunction with the Wind Corrected Munitions Dispenser guidance tail kit is converted to a precision-guided weapon, and the combination is designated CBU-105.

== Overview ==
The CBU-97 consists of an SUU-66/B tactical munition dispenser that contains 10 BLU-108 submunitions. Each submunition contains four hockey-puck-shaped sensor-fused projectiles called Skeets. These detect target vehicles, such as tanks, armored personnel carriers, trucks and other support vehicles, and fire an explosively-formed penetrator downwards at them.

== Operation ==
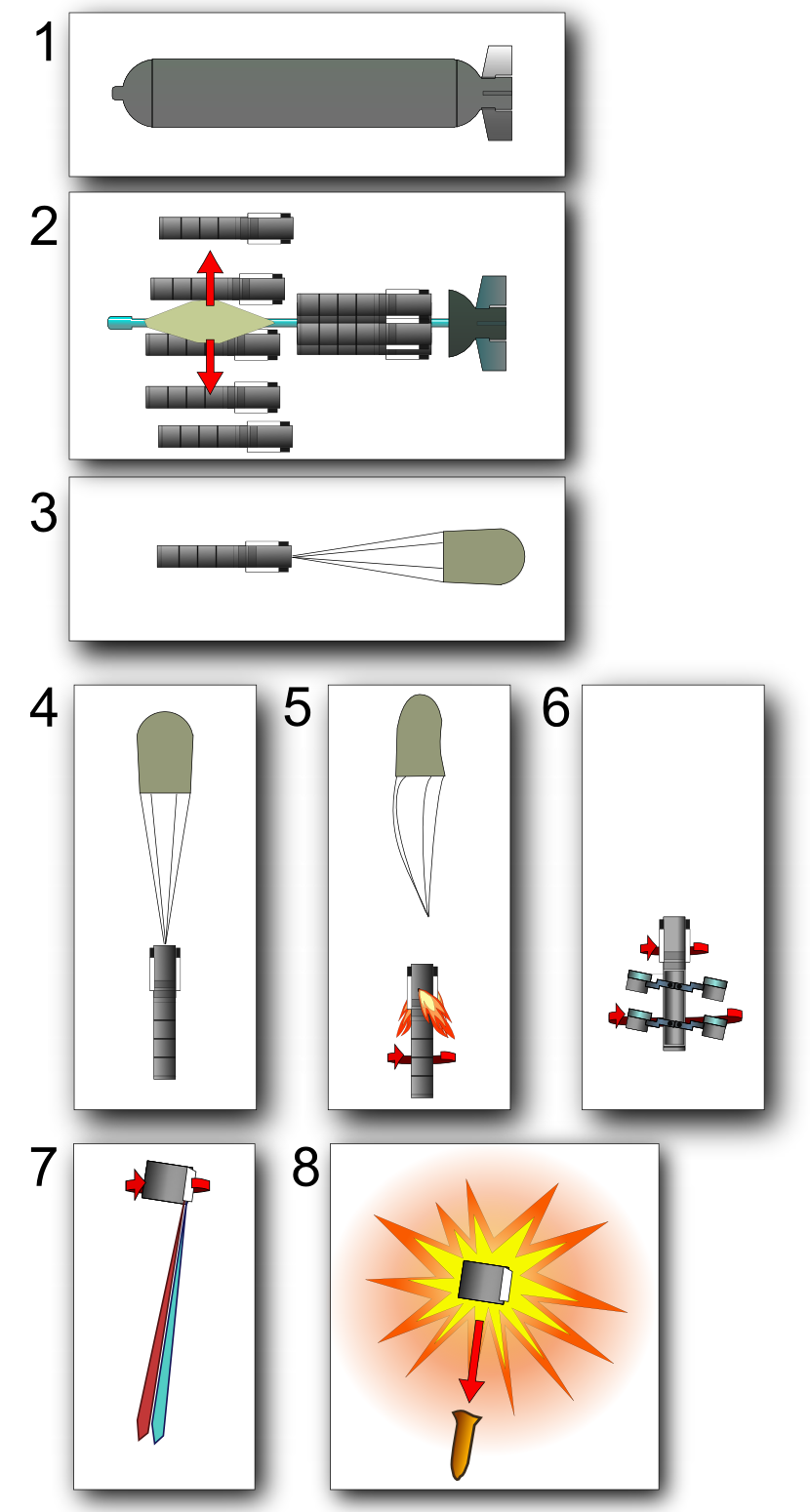

The 40 Skeets scan an area of 1,500 by 500 feet (460 m × 150 m) using infrared and laser sensors, seeking targets by pattern-matching. When a Skeet finds a target it fires an explosively-formed penetrator to destroy it. If a Skeet fails to find a target, it self-destructs 50 feet (15 m) above the ground; if this fails, a back-up timer disables the Skeet. These features are intended to avoid later civilian casualties from unexploded munitions, and result in an unexploded-ordnance rate of less than 1%.

As the CBU-97 approaches its designated aim-point, the dispenser skin is severed into three panels by an explosive cutting charge. The slipstream peels away these panels, exposing the 10 BLU-108 submunitions. An airbag ejects the forward five submunitions, then five in the aft bay. Following a preset timeline, the submunitions deploy parachutes so that they are spaced about 100 feet (30 m) apart. Then each submunition releases its chute, fires a rocket motor that stops its descent and spins it on its longitudinal axis, and releases Skeets 90 degrees apart, in pairs. Each spinning Skeet makes a coning motion that allows it to scan a circular area on the ground.

The laser sensor detects changes in apparent terrain height such as the contour of a vehicle. At the same time, infrared sensors detect heat signatures, such as those emitted by the engine of a vehicle. When the combination of height contours and heat signatures indicative of a target are detected, the Skeet detonates, firing an explosively-formed penetrator (EFP) down into the target at high speed, sufficient to penetrate armor plating and destroy what is protected by it. Even well-armored vehicles such as main battle tanks, while having massive armor protection on the front and sides, are only lightly armored above, and relatively easily penetrated. Each bomb can spread penetrators over an area of 15 acres (61,000 square metres) or more. According to an ABC News consultant, an attack by this bomb would effectively stop an armored convoy moving down a road. While the bomb was designed during the Cold War for fighter-bombers flying at low altitude below radar cover to attack Soviet tanks, a single B-52 high altitude heavy bomber can destroy an entire armored division with these bombs, where in the past dozens of aircraft would have had to drop hundreds of bombs for the same effect.

The CBU-97, or CBU-105 version, is deployed by tactical aircraft from altitudes of 200 to 20,000 feet (60 to 6,100 m) Above Ground Level (AGL) at speeds of 250 to 650 knots (460 to 1,200 km/h).

== History ==
The weapon has been in production since 1992 and it was first deployed, but not used, during Operation Allied Force when NATO entered the Kosovo War. Sensor-fused weapons were first fired in combat during the 2003 invasion of Iraq.

In 2010 the US government announced the sale to India of 512 CBU-105 Sensor Fuzed Weapons. The expected platform is the SEPECAT Jaguar.

Saudi Arabia has also requested the CBU-105. In May 2015, Human Rights Watch reported on, and criticized, the Saudi use of the CBU-105 SFW during the Saudi Arabian-led intervention in Yemen.

The United States last bought SFWs in 2007, after which it continued to be produced for export. In September 2016, Textron announced it would no longer produce the weapon, citing low demand as well as international controversy over the use of cluster munitions.

== Operators ==
In addition to the United States, the CBU-105 has been ordered by Singapore, India, Oman, Saudi Arabia, South Korea, Turkey, and the United Arab Emirates.

== General characteristics ==
Per globalsecurity.org:

- Type: Freefall bomb
- Weight: 927 pounds (420 kg)
- Name: CBU-97 Sensor Fused Weapon (SFW)
- Length: 92 inches (234 cm)
- Diameter: 15.6 inches (40 cm)
- Dispenser: SW-65 tactical dispenser
- Bomblets: 10 × BLU-108/B
- Warhead: Armour Piercing
- Unit Cost: $360,000 - baseline [$ FY90]

== See also ==
- CBU-107 Passive Attack Weapon, WCMD guided bomb which drops non-explosive metal rods
