= CBU-107 Passive Attack Weapon =

Air-dropped non-explosive guided bomb

The CBU-107 Passive Attack Weapon (PAW) is an air-dropped guided bomb containing metal penetrator rods of various sizes. It was designed to attack targets where an explosive effect may be undesirable, such as fuel storage tanks or chemical weapon stockpiles in civilian areas.

== Overview ==
The weapon consists of a Wind Corrected Munitions Dispenser-equipped SUU-66/B Tactical Munitions Dispenser containing 3,750 non-explosive steel and tungsten penetrator rods of various sizes. There is no other version of the CBU-107. The weapon is notable for the speed with which it was developed and fielded, a total of 98 days (with full production occurring by March 9th, 2003). This speed was required by an urgent operation and earned the development team several awards. The CBU-107 is designed to perform effects based warfare, where a strategically valuable battlefield “effect” is achieved without having to damage large portions of the infrastructure in the attacked area. The penetrating rods range in size from several inches to over a foot long and can disable targets such as fuel tanks, antennas, or even a helicopter without necessarily harming nearby people inside thickly-walled buildings. The effect of a PAW rod impacting is similar to that of an armor-piercing fin-stabilized discarding sabot penetrator fired from a tank gun; if they are released from a high enough altitude to reach terminal velocity, they release a large amount of heat in a confined area extremely fast that vaporizes and melts through the small area.

== Combat history ==
The CBU-107 was first used in an attack on the Iraqi Ministry of Information on March 28, 2003, during the 2003 invasion of Iraq. The targets were two antenna arrays, which were both destroyed with little damage to the MOI or adjacent buildings.

== Specifications ==
- Guidance: INS
- Payload:
  - 350 35.56 cm (14-inch) tungsten rods
  - 1,000 17.8 cm (7-inch) tungsten rods
  - 2,400 5.1 cm (2-inch) steel rods

== See also ==
- CBU-97 Sensor Fuzed Weapon, which drops explosively formed kinetic-energy anti-armor penetrators from the same dispenser
