= Wind Corrected Munitions Dispenser =

Wind Corrected Munitions Dispenser (WCMD)
- Type: Bomb guidance kit
- Place of origin: United States of America

Service history
- Used by: See Users

Production history
- Variants: See Variants

Specifications
- Guidance system: Inertial guidance/GPS

The Wind Corrected Munitions Dispenser or WCMD system is a US tail kit produced by Lockheed Martin for use with the Tactical Munitions Dispenser family of cluster bombs to convert them to precision-guided munitions. In 1997 the United States Air Force issued contracts to complete development and begin production of the WCMD, planning to modify 40,000 tactical munitions dispensers - 30,000 for CEM and 5,000 each for Gator and SFW - at a cost of US$8,937 per unit.

When fitted with the WCMD the CBU-87 Combined Effects Munition, CBU-89 GATOR and the CBU-97 Sensor Fuzed Weapon are respectively known as the CBU-103, CBU-104 and the CBU-105; the latter anti-armor weapon was deployed but not used during Operation Allied Force in the Kosovo War, and fired in combat during the 2003 invasion of Iraq.

== Variants ==
=== WCMD ===
- Guidance: INS updated with GPS data from launch platform before release.
- Range: 16–20 km (9.9–12.4 mi).
- Accuracy: 26 metres (85 feet) CEP.

=== WCMD-ER ===
- Guidance: INS combined with integral GPS.
- Range: Wing kit extends range to 40–65 km (25–40 mi).
- Accuracy: 26 metres (85 feet) CEP.

The WCMD-ER program was cancelled in August 2006 due to poor test results and budgetary pressures.

== See also ==
- CBU-87 Combined Effects Munition
- GBU-89 GATOR
- CBU-107 Passive Attack Weapon
