= Corbyn wreath-laying controversy =

2018 political controversy in the UK

The Corbyn wreath-laying controversy refers to a political controversy in the United Kingdom surrounding the visit of Jeremy Corbyn to the Hamman Chott Cemetery in Tunis in 2014.

On 15 August 2018, the Daily Mail published an article stating that, prior to becoming Labour Party Leader, Corbyn had been present at a 2014 wreath-laying at a cemetery which contained the graves of many Palestinian activists including Salah Khalaf and Atef Bseiso, both of whom were alleged members of the Black September Organization and were allegedly behind the Munich massacre of Israeli athletes at the 1972 Summer Olympics.

Corbyn and Conservative peer Baron Sheikh had been in Tunisia to attend the International Conference on Monitoring the Palestinian Political and Legal Situation in the Light of Israeli Aggression. During that visit to Tunisia, Corbyn had also attended a commemorative ceremony for victims of the 1985 Israeli air strikes on the PLO headquarters, strikes that had been widely condemned at the time, including by the U.S. Government. The initial ceremony had been held at a statue erected in memory of the victims, before moving to a cemetery containing most of the graves of those killed during the air strikes. The cemetery also contained the graves of Khalaf and Bseiso. At the cemetery, Corbyn was photographed laying a wreath in an area that was near to both a memorial for the air strikes and the two graves.

The controversy is considered to be part of a wider series of issues relating to allegations of antisemitism in the Labour party and Corbyn's personal position on the Middle East, which have escalated since Corbyn became a front-runner for Labour Party leader in August 2015.

== Conference ==
Corbyn, Conservative peer Lord Sheikh and Liberal Democrat peer Baron Andrew Phillips were attending the "International Conference on Monitoring the Palestinian Political and Legal Situation in the Light of Israeli Aggression" in Tunis, organised by the Centre for Strategic Studies for North Africa. According to Sheikh, representatives of Hamas may have been present but he did not meet them. Conservative MPs Robert Halfon (a member of the Conservative Friends of Israel) and Zac Goldsmith called for a party investigation into his attendance, arguing that it breached the party's code of conduct and that a failure to investigate it would be hypocritical. Lord Sheikh denied any wrongdoing, calling the complaints "trivial" and "politically motivated" following Sheikh's condemnation of Johnson's controversial remarks regarding the niqab/burqa. Sheikh later successfully won a libel case against the owners of the Daily Mail due to their publication of an article claiming the peer had spent years "rubbing shoulders with Islamists, hate preachers and Holocaust deniers".

== Ceremony ==
Corbyn holding a wreath at Hamman Chott Cemetery, Tunis, 2014

On 15 August 2018 the Daily Mail claimed that Corbyn had instead been pictured 15 yards (14 m) away from the memorial for the air strike victims while holding a wreath near the graves of Salah Khalaf and Atef Bseiso (senior leaders of Fatah and PLO in the early 1970s) who were accused of having links to the Black September Organization responsible for the Munich massacre at the 1972 Summer Olympics, in which eleven Israeli Olympic team members were taken hostage and killed in addition to a West German police officer. In a 2014 write-up of the event for the Morning Star, Corbyn wrote that "wreaths were laid at the graves of those who died on that day and on the graves of others killed by Mossad agents in Paris in 1991". Corbyn has not confirmed who he was referring to in this article (Bseiso was killed in Paris in 1992, and Khalaf was assassinated in Tunisia in 1991).

Also on 15 August 2018 the BBC News filmed a report from inside the Hamman Chott Cemetery, showing where Corbyn would have likely stood within the designated area where all dignitaries typically stand on an annual basis to remember those who were killed in the Israel airstrike in 1985 and for senior members of the Palestine Liberation Organization, under the small covered area of the enclosed Palestinian section of the cemetery, which also covers the graves of Bseiso and Khalaf.

There was condemnation from some of the British and Jewish press, as well as from some members of the Labour Party and Israeli Prime Minister Benjamin Netanyahu. Jonathan Goldstein, the head of the Jewish Leadership Council, said Corbyn's alleged participation in an event honoring the Munich terrorists is a "defining moment, typifying and showing his great hostility towards Israel and, through Israel, to the Jewish people". Goldstein criticized Corbyn's refusal to apologise to the Munich Massacre widows and called it "un-British". A Labour party spokesperson stated "Jeremy did not lay any wreath at the graves of those alleged to have been linked to the Black September organisation or the 1972 Munich killings. He of course condemns that terrible attack, as he does the 1985 bombing." Corbyn stated "I was there because I wanted to see a fitting memorial to everyone who has died in every terrorist incident everywhere". Israeli Olympic athlete Shaul Ladany, who was a survivor of both the Munich massacre and The Holocaust, said that "I have no doubt that he [Jeremy Corbyn] is an anti-Semite. He should disappear from the political scene."

The Labour Party made a complaint to the press watchdog Independent Press Standards Organisation regarding stories in the Daily Mail, The Sun, The Times, The Daily Telegraph, the Daily Express and the Metro newspapers, arguing that these organisations "seriously misrepresented the event" and "underplayed the role of mainstream Palestinian leaders conducting the ceremony", although the complaint was later dropped.

== Funding of trip ==
In August 2018 Corbyn was reported to Parliamentary Commissioner for Standards following claims that he failed to declare who paid for his Tunisia trip in accordance with parliamentary requirements. The Labour Party stated that the costs of the trip were under the £660 limit at which a declaration should be made. Sheikh, who traveled to Tunis to attend the same conference, but has stated that he was unaware of a wreath laying ceremony, reported that the Tunisian government underwrote his expenses.

E-mails, revealed in April 2019 by the Guido Fawkes blog, showed that Corbyn had asked his staff to "keep it cheap" in order to not hit the £660 limit, which would possibly lead the trip to "be referred to debates etc".
