= United Nations Security Council Resolution 611 =

UN Security Council Resolution 611
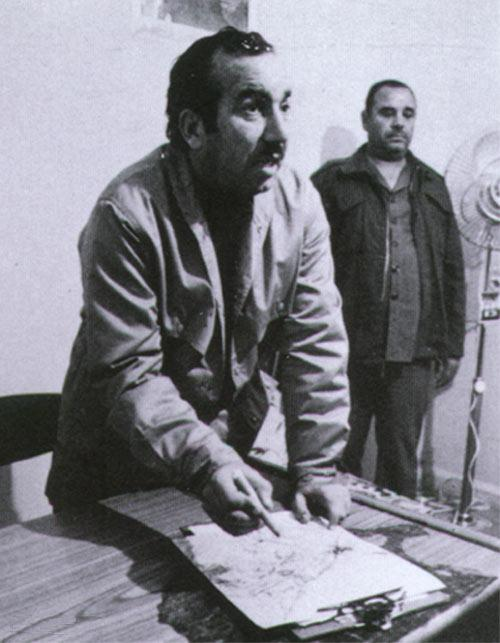
- Abu Jihad al-Wazir
- Date: 25 April 1988
- Meeting no.: 2,810
- Code: S/RES/611 (Document)
- Subject: Israel-Tunisia
- Voting summary: 14 voted for; None voted against; 1 abstained
- Result: Adopted

Security Council composition
- Permanent members: China; France; Soviet Union; United Kingdom; United States
- Non-permanent members: Algeria; Argentina; Brazil; Italy; Japan; Nepal; Senegal; West Germany; Yugoslavia; Zambia

United Nations Security Council resolution 611, adopted on 25 April 1988, after recalling Resolution 573 (1985) and noting a complaint from Tunisia against Israel, the Council condemned an attack on Tunisia on 16 April 1988, in which Khalil al-Wazir, an affiliate of the Palestine Liberation Organization and founder of the Fatah political party, was assassinated.

The Council described the attack as a "flagrant violation of the Charter", and urged Member States to take measures to prevent such attacks occurring against the sovereignty and territorial integrity of all States. It also confirmed its determination to take appropriate steps to implement the current resolution, requesting the Secretary-General to report urgently to the Council any new developments in the situation.

The resolution, which did not explicitly implicate Israel in the attack, was adopted by 14 votes to none, with one abstention from the United States.

== See also ==
- Arab–Israeli conflict
- List of United Nations Security Council Resolutions 601 to 700 (1987–1991)
- Operation Wooden Leg in 1985
