= Guli Sheikh =

The Right Honourable The Lady Sheikh of Cornhill in the City of London
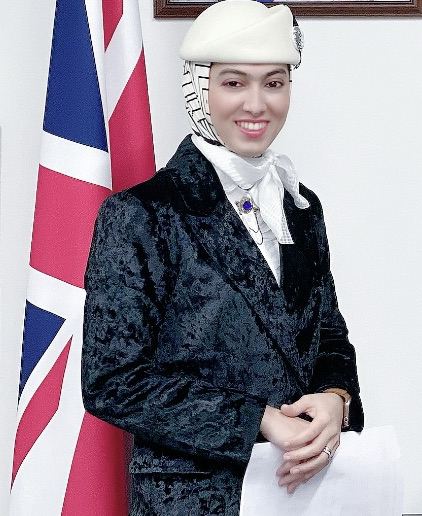
- Sheikh in 2020
- Born: Guli Muradova; 1985 (age 40–41); Samarkand, Uzbekistan
- Education: Said Business School
- Spouse: Mohamed Sheikh, Baron Sheikh (m. 2018)

Guli Sheikh, Baroness Sheikh of Cornhill in the City of London (née Guli Muradova; Гули Мурадова) is an Uzbek-British artist, celebrity, philosopher, socialite, entrepreneur, UN Women UK delegate and philanthropist. She is the founder of Women's Leadership.

== Early life and education ==
The Lady Sheikh was born in 1985 in Samarkand, Uzbekistan to Samarkand Tajik parents. She developed an early interest in the arts, participating in drama and musical events during her education. She graduated with a post graduate diploma in nursing from Uzbekistan.

In 2006, she moved to the United Kingdom for higher education and studied at the Said Business School at the University of Oxford Women's Development and Leadership. She also holds a diploma in strategic management and leadership level 7 extended diploma from BTEC, Pearson in the UK.

== Career ==
The Lady Sheikh began her career as a nurse at the regional branch of the Emergency Hospital in Samarkand Neurology department in Uzbekistan.

In 2014, she began her painting career during which she received support from a private studio. She also engages in writing love poetry. In 2018, she married Lord Mohamed Sheikh, Baron Sheikh of Cornhill in the City of London, a member of the British House of Lords. Later, she co-founded The Silk Route Global with Lord Sheikh, a UK-based trading company that connects Central Asian artisans with European countries.

She is also the founder of The London College of English in Tashkent, which focuses on teaching English language and culture.

In 2020, she was appointed as the Goodwill Ambassador of the Nazari Digar movement, an organization that provides support to children with Down syndrome and their families in Tajikistan. During the COVID-19 pandemic, she donated 75 million soms to help people in Sardoba.
