= Aero L-159 ALCA =

Light attack aircraft

L-159A / L-159T
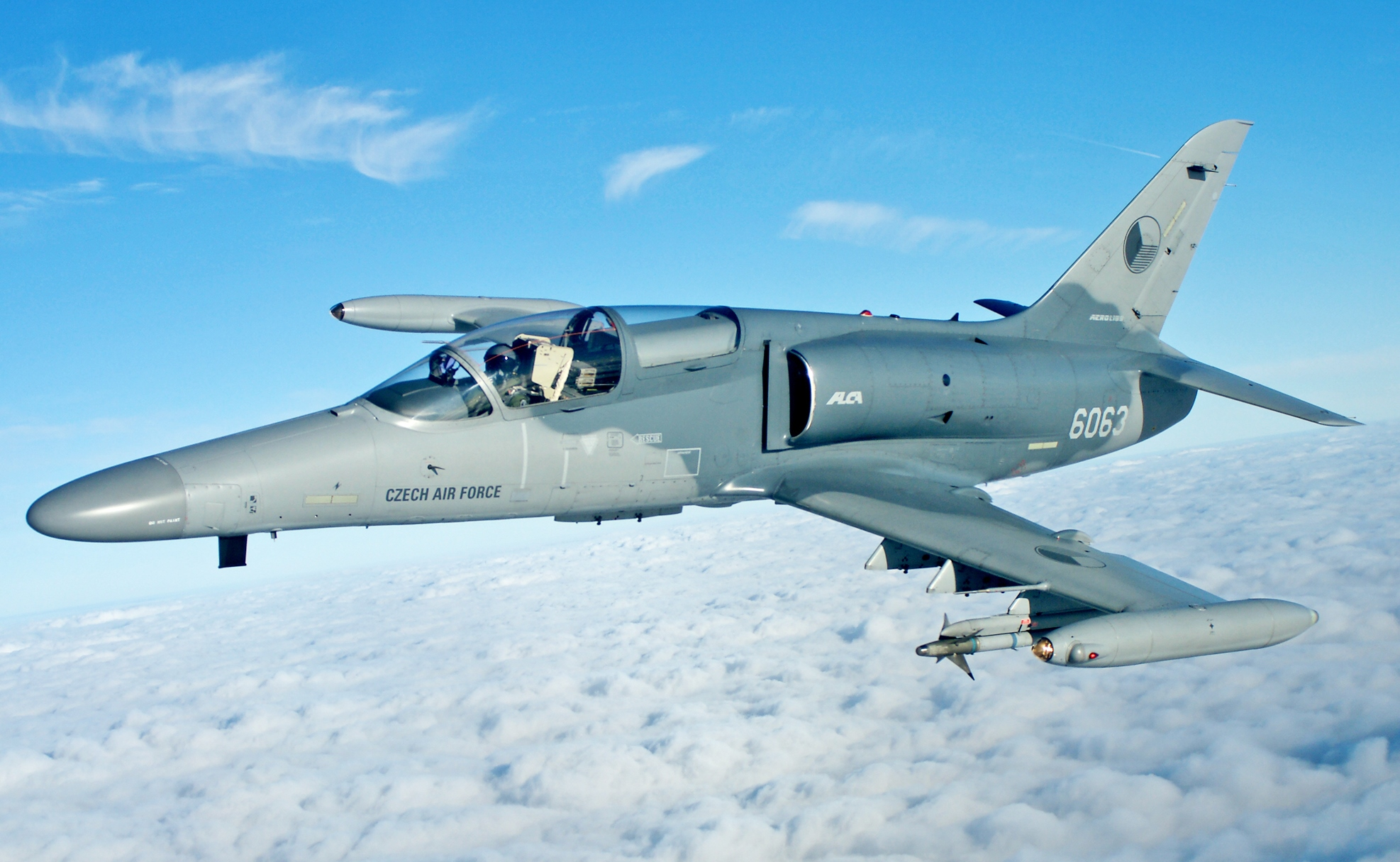
- Czech Air Force L-159A Alca carrying an AIM-9 Sidewinder

General information
- Type: L-159A: Light combat aircraft; L-159T: Advanced jet trainer and light combat aircraft
- Manufacturer: Aero Vodochody
- Status: Operational
- Primary users: Czech Air Force Iraqi Air Force
- Number built: L-159A: 72

History
- Manufactured: 1997–2003 and 2016–2017
- Introduction date: April 2000
- First flight: 4 August 1997
- Developed from: Aero L-59 Super Albatros

The Aero L-159 ALCA (Note: Acronym for Advanced Light Combat Aircraft. Also known as L-159 Alca.) is family of subsonic light combat aircraft and advanced trainer developed in the single-seat L-159A and two-seat L-159T versions, respectively, produced in the Czech Republic by Aero Vodochody. It was derived from the Aero L-59 Super Albatros trainer, which was in turn developed from the Aero L-39 Albatros series.

Development of the L-159 started in 1993 as an initiative to replace various Soviet-era fighter aircraft with a modern Czech-built equivalent; it was decided against pursuing a clean-sheet design to avoid excessive costs. Development was supported by the Czech government, which ordered 72 L-159A single-seat aircraft for roughly 50 billion CZK to equip the Czech Air Force. In 1998, the Boeing Company became a strategic partner in both the project and Aero Vodochody itself. On 4 August 1997, the L-159 performed its maiden flight; on 10 April 2000, the first production aircraft was delivered to the Czech Air Force. Further development of the type proceeded, particularly of the twin-seat L-159 models.

In 2003, the Czech fleet of 72 L-159A aircraft was reduced to 24 due to budget constraints. Following several years of storage, the Czech government has re-sold most of the redundant aircraft to both military and civilian operators, namely the Iraqi Air Force and Draken International. The L-159 has seen active combat use by the Iraqi Air Force against Islamic State of Iraq and the Levant (ISIS) insurgents in the country. In Draken's service, the L-159 (colloquially known as "Honey Badger") has been employed as an aggressor aircraft for pilot training. Since 2007, six L-159A aircraft have been rebuilt into T1 trainer derivatives. During 2017, Aero Vodochody formally restarted production of the type, and unveiled a newly built L-159T1 for the Iraqi Air Force; furthermore, the Czech Air Force was in the process of acquiring L-159T2 two-seaters.

== Development ==
Immediately after the 1989 Velvet Revolution, the president of Czechoslovakia Václav Havel declared a demobilisation of the Czechoslovak defence industry. Nevertheless, after the dissolution of the Soviet Union in 1991, the Czech company Aero Vodochody continued developing the basic L-39 Albatros design with a view toward greater export. The resulting L-39MS, later designed as L-59 Super Albatros, featured a more powerful turbofan engine, advanced avionics, and has been bought in quantity by Egypt and Tunisia. In 1993, a group of Czech military experts launched a project to produce a modern domestic fighter to replace the obsolete Soviet aircraft. Since the proposed Aero L-X supersonic fighter development proved to be financially demanding (up to US$2 billion), the less costly L-159 subsonic attack aircraft, derived from the L-39 Albatros, was approved for procurement instead.

Conducted between 1994 and 1997, the technical development of the L-159 ALCA in Aero Vodochody consisted primarily of building a single L-159 two-seat prototype, based on the L-59 airframe, and utilizing western engine, avionics and weapon systems, with Rockwell Collins (eventually Boeing) as the avionics integrator. During 1995, the Czech government placed a large order for 72 L-159A single-seat aircraft at a cost around 50 billion CZK. The contract was signed on 4 July 1997. The number of aircraft to be delivered was based upon the size of the Czech Air Force at that time, taking into account the necessity to replace MiG-23BN and Su-22 fighter-bombers and Su-25 attack aircraft. Due to the cost of the project, the Czech government decided that a strategic partner, the Boeing Company, would be invited to collaborate with Aero Vodochody in the venture during May 1998.

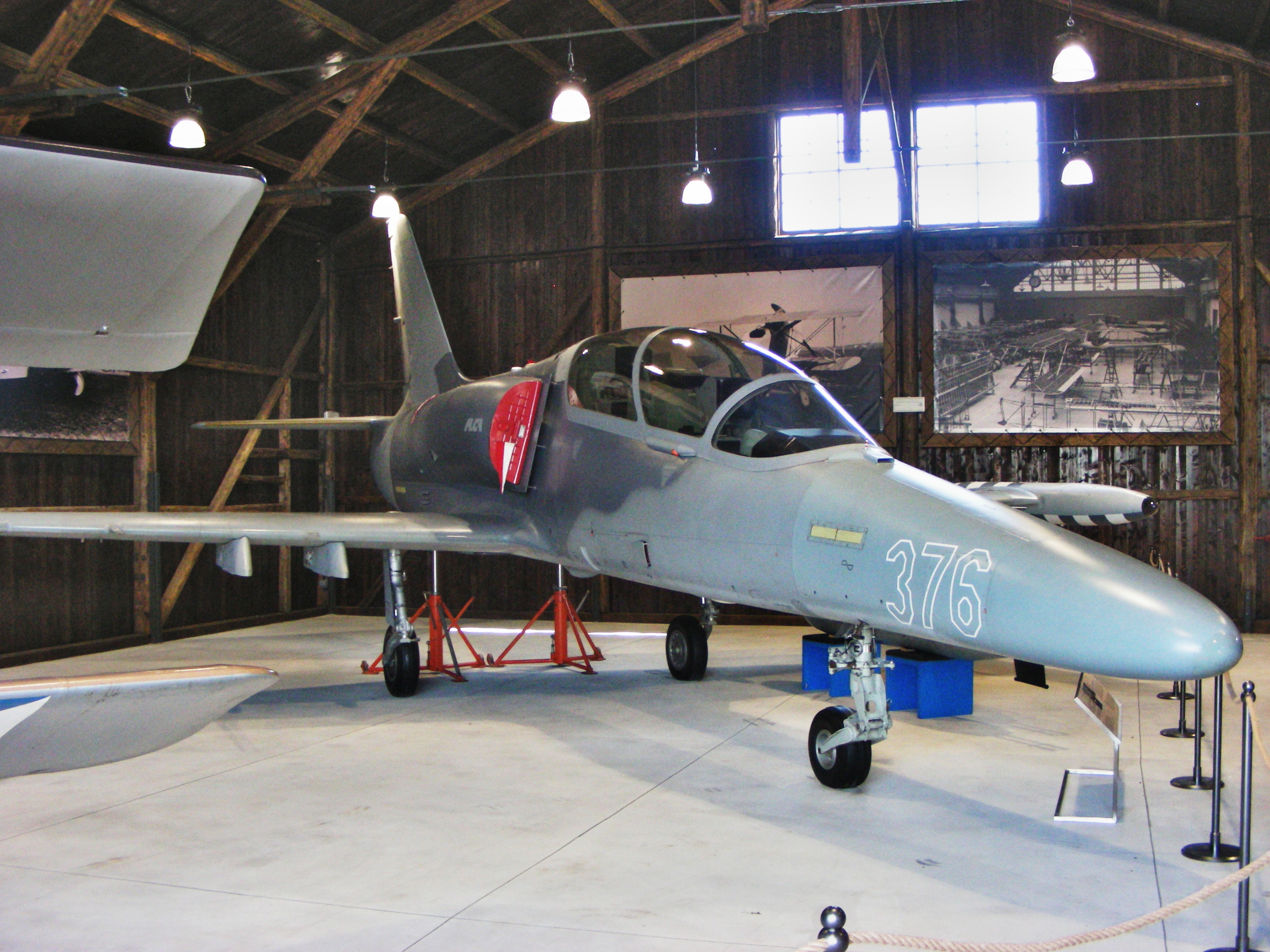
The first L-159 prototype (5831) in the Prague Aviation Museum

The maiden flight of the first L-159 prototype (5831, "376 white") occurred on 2 August 1997 with a two-seat version. On 18 August 1998, the single-seat L-159A prototype (5832, "356 white") first flew; it was completed to Czech customer specifications. On 10 April 2000, the first delivery of the L-159A took place to the Czech Air Force. Prototype (6073) of the two-seat L-159B variant first flew on 1 June 2002.

During October 2004, the Czech government announced that Aero Vodochody was to be privatised, and Boeing decided to withdraw from involvement in both the L-159 and the overall company. During October 2006, Aero Vodochody was sold to Penta Investments. In 2009, Aero Vodochody selected V-Dot Systems (split off from Boeing) as the L-159 avionics integrator. V-Dot will replace the Honeywell multi-function displays (MFD) and upgrade the mission processors to support new functions.

On 31 March 2017, following a 13-year stoppage in L-159 production after the delivery of the final Czech Air Force example, Aero Vodochody held a ceremony to mark the resumption of manufacturing; a new-build L-159 destined for the Iraqi Air Force was present. This batch of production aircraft featured several improvements, such as the use of a wet wing and increased endurance; further enhancements were also being worked on at that time. The company reportedly negotiated with Argentina on the topic of the L-159, which reportedly may have included the establishment of an assembly line in the country.

== Design ==
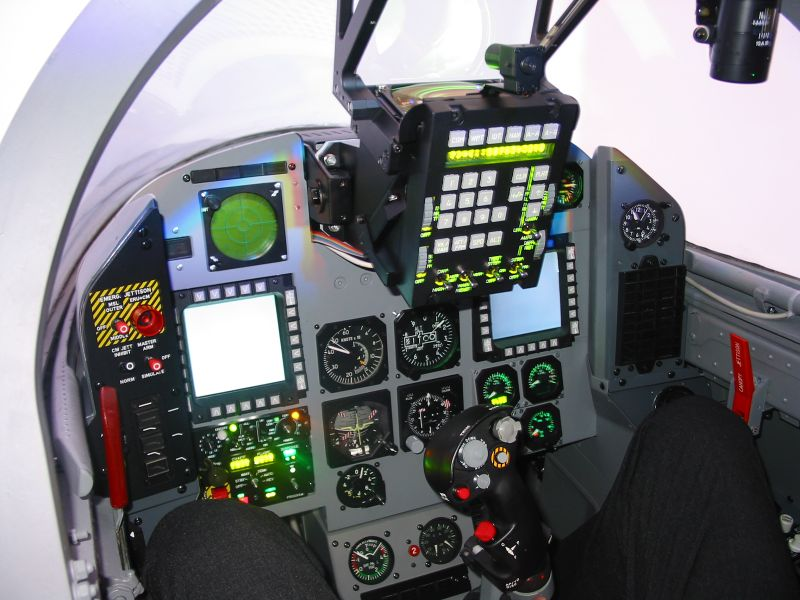
L-159 cockpit with the original Honeywell 4x4 inch MFDs

The L-159 ALCA is designed for the principal role of light combat aircraft (single-seat L-159A variant) or light attack jet and advanced/lead-in fighter trainer (two-seat L-159B and T variants). Design of the L-159 was derived from the L-39/59 in terms of aerodynamic configuration but a number of changes were made to improve its combat capabilities. These include strengthening of the airframe, reinforcing of the cockpit with composite and ceramic ballistic armour and enlargement of the aircraft's nose to accommodate the radar. Compared to the L-59, the number of underwing pylons was increased from four to six, and a new hardpoint under the fuselage was added instead of a GSh-23L cannon.

The aircraft is powered by the non-afterburning Honeywell/ITEC F124-GA-100 turbofan engine with a maximum thrust of 28 kN. Almost 2,000 litres of fuel are stored in eight internal tanks (six in the fuselage, two at the wingtips) with up to four external drop tanks (two 500 L and two 350 L tanks) carried under the wings. The lightly armoured cockpit is equipped with a VS-2B ejection seat capable of catapulting the pilot at a zero flight level and zero speed. The aircraft's avionics, based on the MIL-STD-1553 databus, include Selex Navigation and Attack Suite, Ring Laser Gyro based Inertial Navigation System (INS) and Global Positioning System (GPS). Flight data are displayed both on the FV-3000 head-up display (HUD) and two multi-function displays (MFD).

Communications are provided by a pair of Collins ARC-182 transceivers. Self-protection of the L-159 is ensured by the Sky Guardian 200 radar warning receiver (RWR) and the Vinten Vicon 78 Series 455 chaff and flare dispenser. L-159A and T2 variants are equipped with the Italian FIAR Grifo L multi-mode Doppler radar for all-weather, day and night operations. All variants of L-159 are equipped with a total of seven hardpoints (one under-fuselage and six under-wing mountings), capable of carrying external loads up to 2,340 kg. The aircraft can be equipped with a variety of weapons ranging from unguided bombs and rocket pods to air-to-ground and air-to-air guided missiles or with special devices to conduct aerial reconnaissance or electronic warfare. For example, it is capable of carrying advanced targeting pods including the AN/AAQ-28(V) LITENING.

== Operational history ==
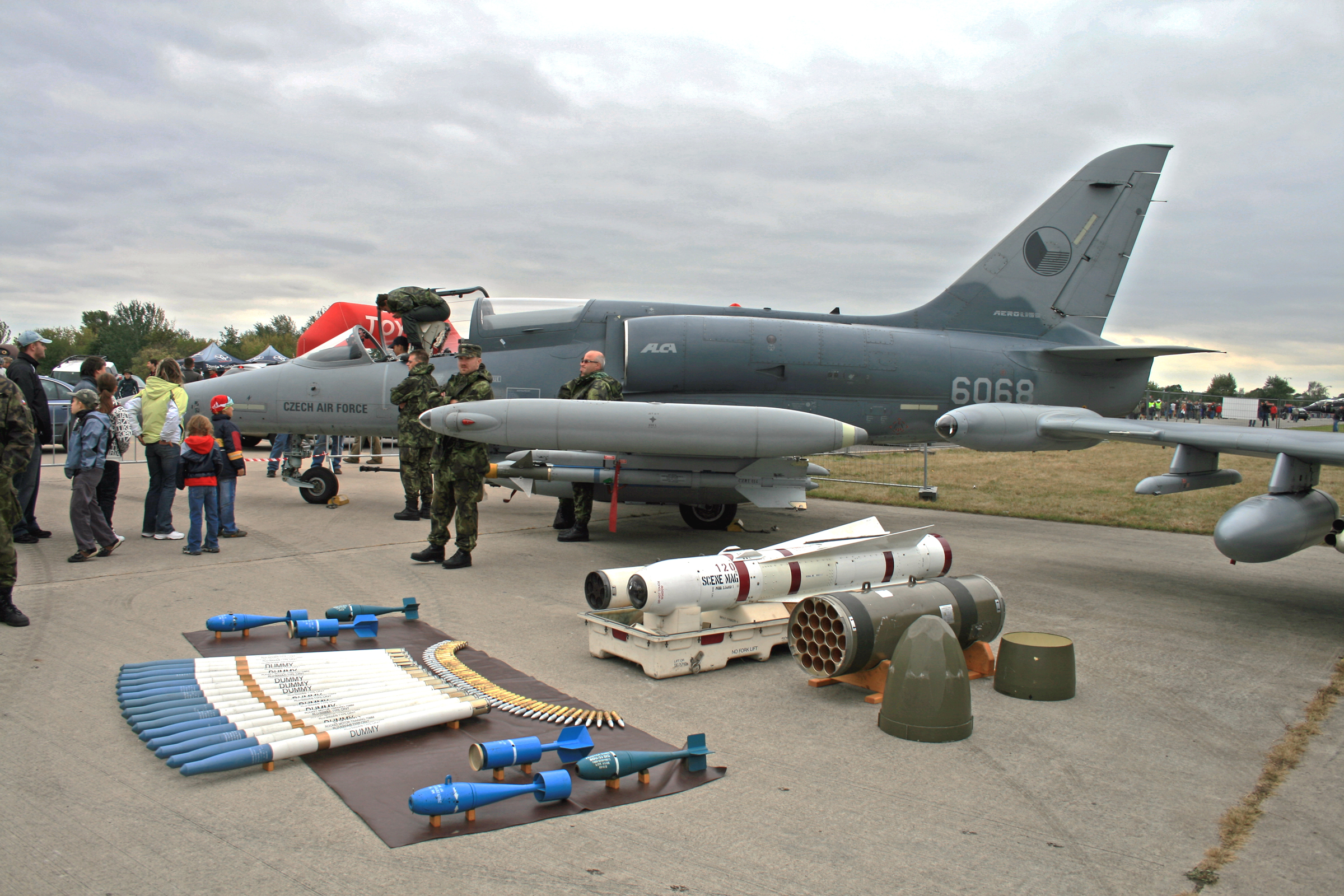
Czech Air Force L-159A with its armament

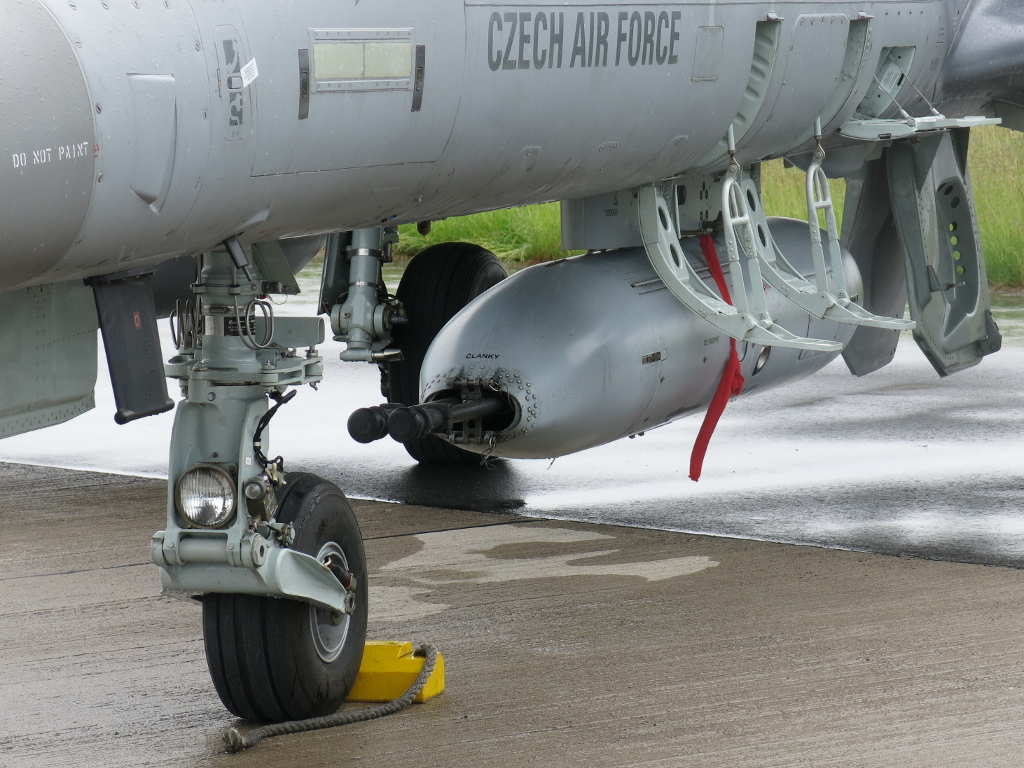
PL-20 gun pod

=== Czech Republic ===
The Czech Air Force is the primary operator of the L-159. During 1995, the Czech government ordered 72 aircraft, but after review, opted to reduce the fleet size to 24 L-159s, which received the latest avionics upgrades, while the remaining aircraft were placed into long-term storage. By 2016, the Czech Air Force had 16 L-159A and 5 L-159T1 aircraft in service. On 1 June 2016, Aero Vodochody received an order to upgrade an initial batch of 16 Czech Air Force L-159s.

=== Iraq ===
On 15 October 2012, it was announced that Iraq had agreed to purchase 28 L-159s from the Czech government. During early 2015, Iraq signed a deal for 14 L-159 aircraft, comprising 12 L-159As and two L-159T1s, for the Iraqi Air Force. This sale was politically controversial in the United Kingdom, as it necessitated the lifting of a long-standing ban on the export of British radar technology to Iraq. The first two Czech L-159s were delivered to Iraq on 5 November 2015. In May 2016, numerous Iraqi L-159s participated in attacks upon positions held by Islamic State of Iraq and the Levant (ISIL) insurgents in the city of Fallujah. During October and November 2016, L-159 aircraft operated by Squadron No. 115 were deployed in the battle against ISIL forces at the Southern outskirts of Mosul.

As the threat posed by ISIS diminished in Iraq, the L-159s were placed into temporary storage around 2017 or 2018. During February 2022, it was announced that the Iraqi L159s had been brought back into active service, although they were only capable of limited operations initially. It had reportedly been used in multiple strikes against insurgents in ISIL hideouts in the Hamrin Mountains of Diyala province during late 2021. During early 2022, Iraq has been in contact with Aero Vodochody on the topic of modernising its L-159 fleet.

As of March 2023 an Iraqi L159 was photographed carrying the Turkish Aselpod reconnaissance, surveillance and targeting pod.

=== Spain ===
In 2009, EADS-CASA of Spain exchanged with the CzAF four CASA C-295 for three L-159As, two L-159T1s and 130 million Euros. Later the two L-159T1s were returned by EADS-CASA to the Czech Republic as compensation for the C-295M not meeting the counter measures requirements of the CzAF at the time of delivery. This problem has been solved by EADS-CASA three years later and the remaining three L-159As resold by EADS-CASA to Lewis Fighter Fleet LLC.

=== United States ===
During 2014, it was announced that Draken International Inc., a civilian American company that cooperates with the US military for pilot training, was in the process of acquiring 21 ex-Czech Air Force L-159s. The deal made Draken International into the world's largest private air force. Aero Vodochody handed over the first L-159 aircraft to the company on 30 September 2015. Draken International has secured contacts with both the United States Air Force and the Royal Air Force to use its L-159s as aggressor aircraft for pilot training.

A separate company, Lewis Fighter Fleet LLC, also operates three L-159As for its own purposes. These aircraft, which were formerly owned by EADS-CASA, were acquired by the firm in July 2013.

== Variants ==
=== Single-seat ===
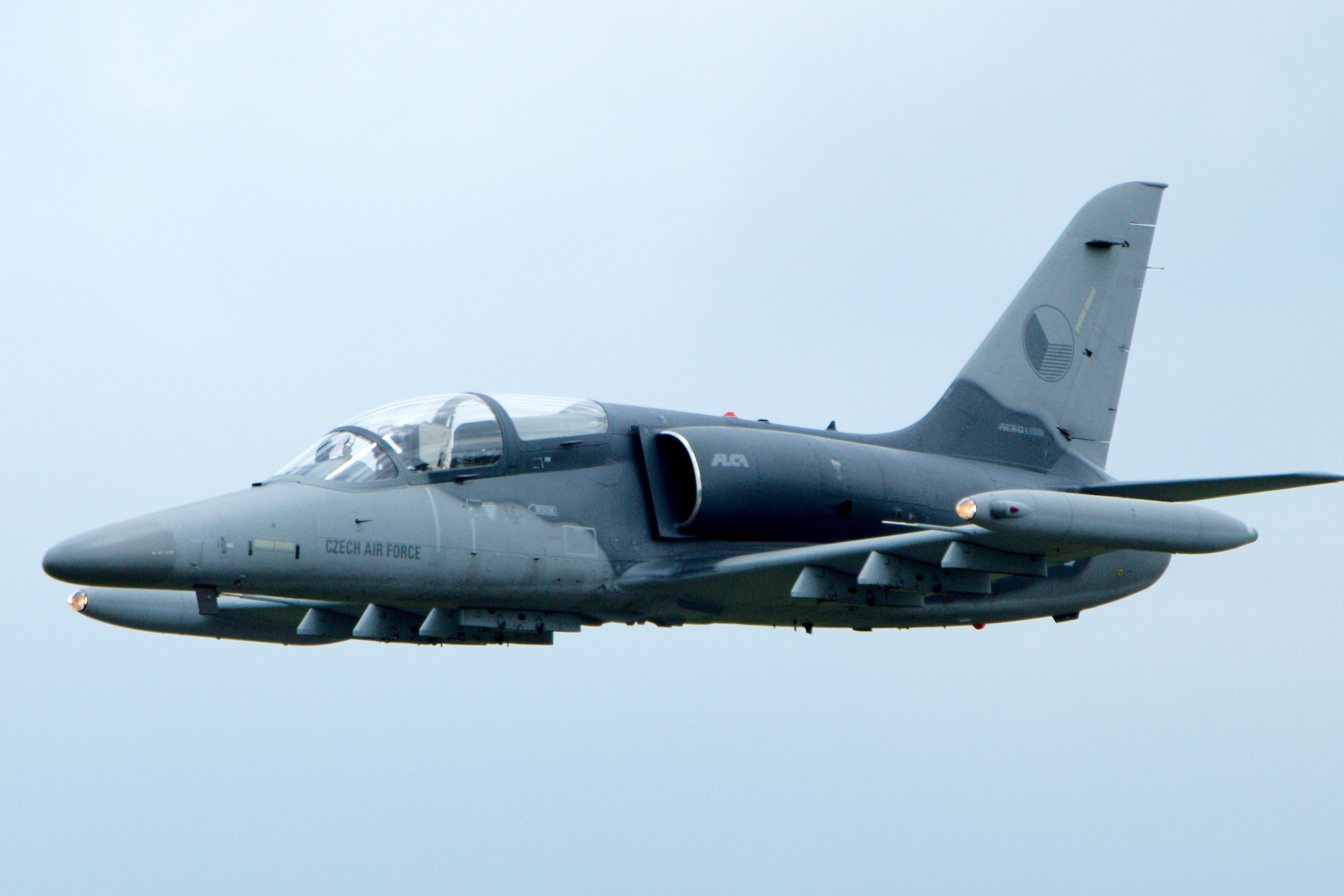
L-159A

==== L-159A ====
The L-159A ALCA is a single-seat light multi-role combat aircraft designed for a variety of air-to-air, air-to-ground and reconnaissance missions. The aircraft is equipped with a multi-mode Doppler Grifo-L radar (a variant of the Grifo-F x-band multi-mode, pulse-doppler radar), for all-weather, day and night operations. It can carry a wide range of NATO standard stores including air-to-air and air-to-ground missiles and laser guided bombs. The L-159A is in operational service with the Czech and Iraqi air forces. There are two different configurations being used by the Czech Air Force – using the Honeywell 4x4 inch MFDs or the Vdot 5x6.7 inch MFDs. Avionic upgrades are designed and developed by V-Dot Systems Inc.

==== L-159E ====
The L-159E ALCA is the export designation of L-159A in service with Draken International.

==== F/A-259 ====
Combat-capable variant first unveiled at the Farnborough Airshow on 16 July 2018. Developed in collaboration with Israel Aerospace Industries and powered by a Honeywell F124-GA-100 engine. The aircraft is pitched for the U.S. Air Force Light Attack/Armed Reconnaissance program.

=== Two-seat ===
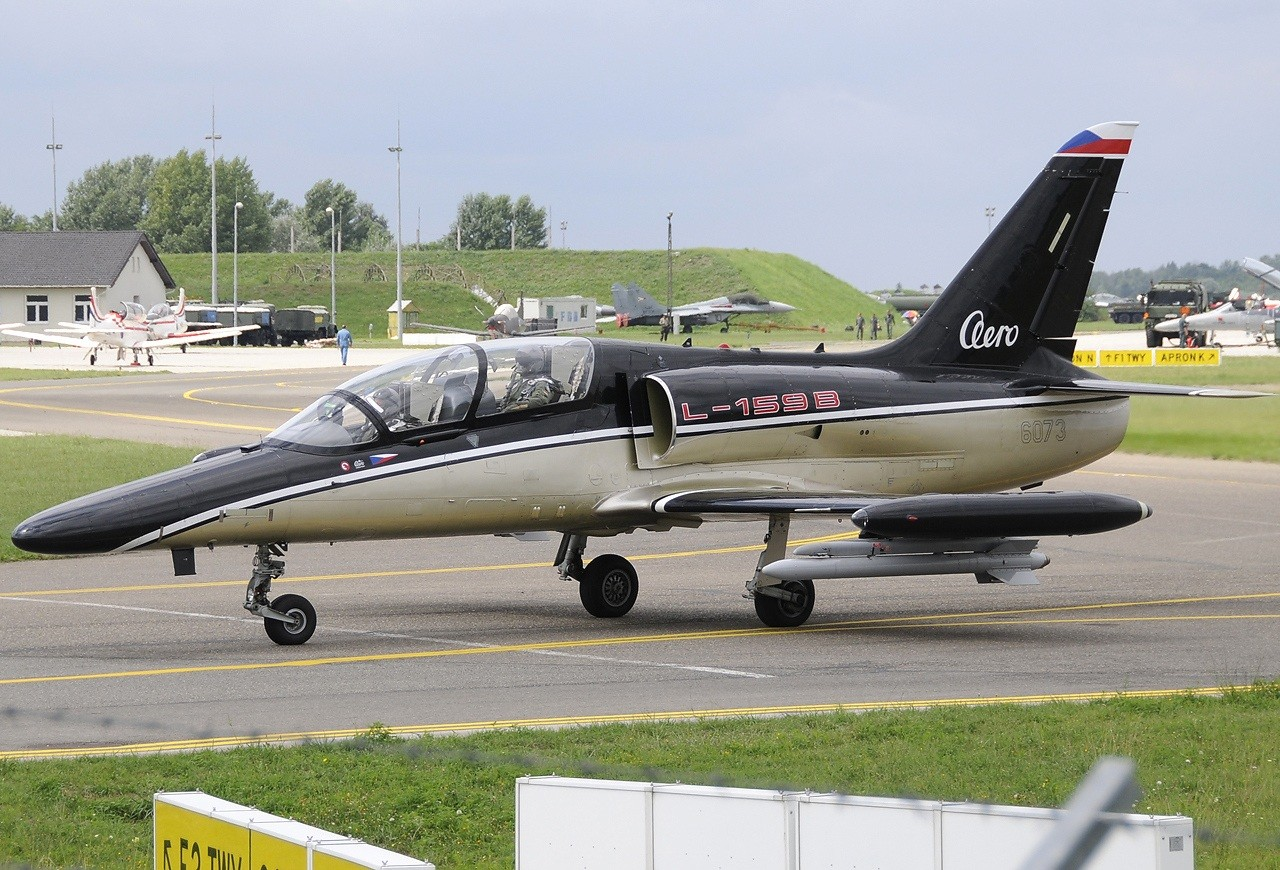
L-159B

==== L-159B ====
The L-159B, also known as L-159B Albatros II, is a two-seat version primarily designed for Advanced and Operational/Lead-In Fighter Training. The L-159B configuration can also be tailored to customer specific requirements and adapted to needs of basic training as well as combat missions including air-to-ground, patrol and reconnaissance missions. On 23 July 2002, the Czech military signed a letter of intent on acquisition of the first two L-159B aircraft. However, due to the budget constraints the trade did not materialize. The only prototype has been rebuilt by Aero Vodochody into L-159T2X demonstrator. The aircraft's designation was changed on 14 December 2015.

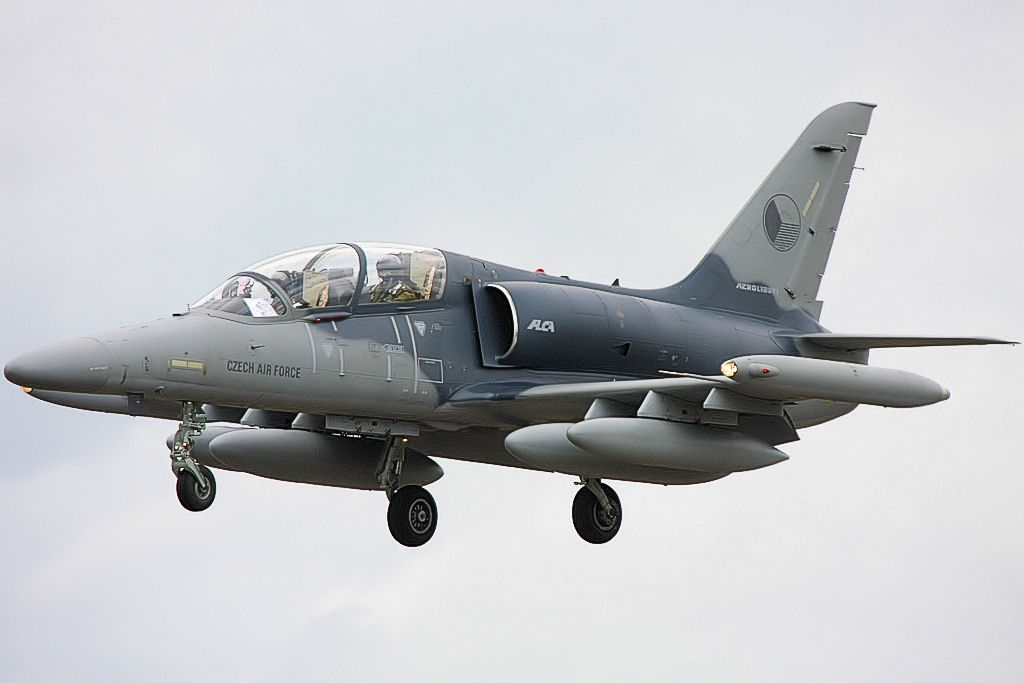
L-159T1

==== L-159T1 ====
The L-159T1 is a two-seat trainer derivative used by the Czech and Iraqi Air Force. All L-159T1s (excluding one newly built L-159T1 for the Iraqi Air Force) are modified L-159A airframes taken from storage. Unlike L-159A, they have just one MFD in each cockpit and no radar. L-159T1 S/N 6069 made its first flight on 8 March 2007 and the first batch of four aircraft was handed over to the Czech Air Force on 23 November 2007. Another two aircraft were delivered in August and December 2010, respectively. L-159T1 S/N 6069 was transferred to Aero Vodochody on 30 June 2015 as a part of the Iraqi contract which included handover of four actively used aircraft – three L-159A and one L-159T1 – to the Iraqi Air Force.

==== L-159T1+ ====
Prototype L-159T1+ S/N 6067 (manufactured as L-159A in 2003 and converted to L-159T1 in 2007) was unveiled by Aero Vodochody in March 2017. L-159T1+ aircraft are characterized by an upgraded mission system, avionics and newly installed Grifo-L radar, offering the same combat capability as the single-seat L-159A. The T1+ modernization of 4 Czech Air Force L-159T1 is scheduled to be completed in December 2019.

==== L-159T2 ====
The L-159T2 is a two-seat trainer with full combat capability converted from stored L-159A airframes. Compared to the L-159T1, it has a higher proportion of newly manufactured components and a Grifo-L radar installed. Instead of mirroring the instruments to the rear seat, the new two-seater will have independent instruments interchangeable with the L-159A while using the same software configuration. The Czech Air Force has ordered 3 L-159T2 aircraft scheduled to be delivered in November 2018.

== Operators ==
=== Military operators ===
Czech Republic

- Czech Air Force – 16 L-159A, 5 L-159T1 and 3 L-159T2 aircraft in service as of August 2016.

Iraq

- Iraqi Air Force – 12 L-159A and 2 L-159T1 aircraft ordered; 6 L-159A and 1 L-159T1 in service as of September 2016.

=== Civilian operators ===
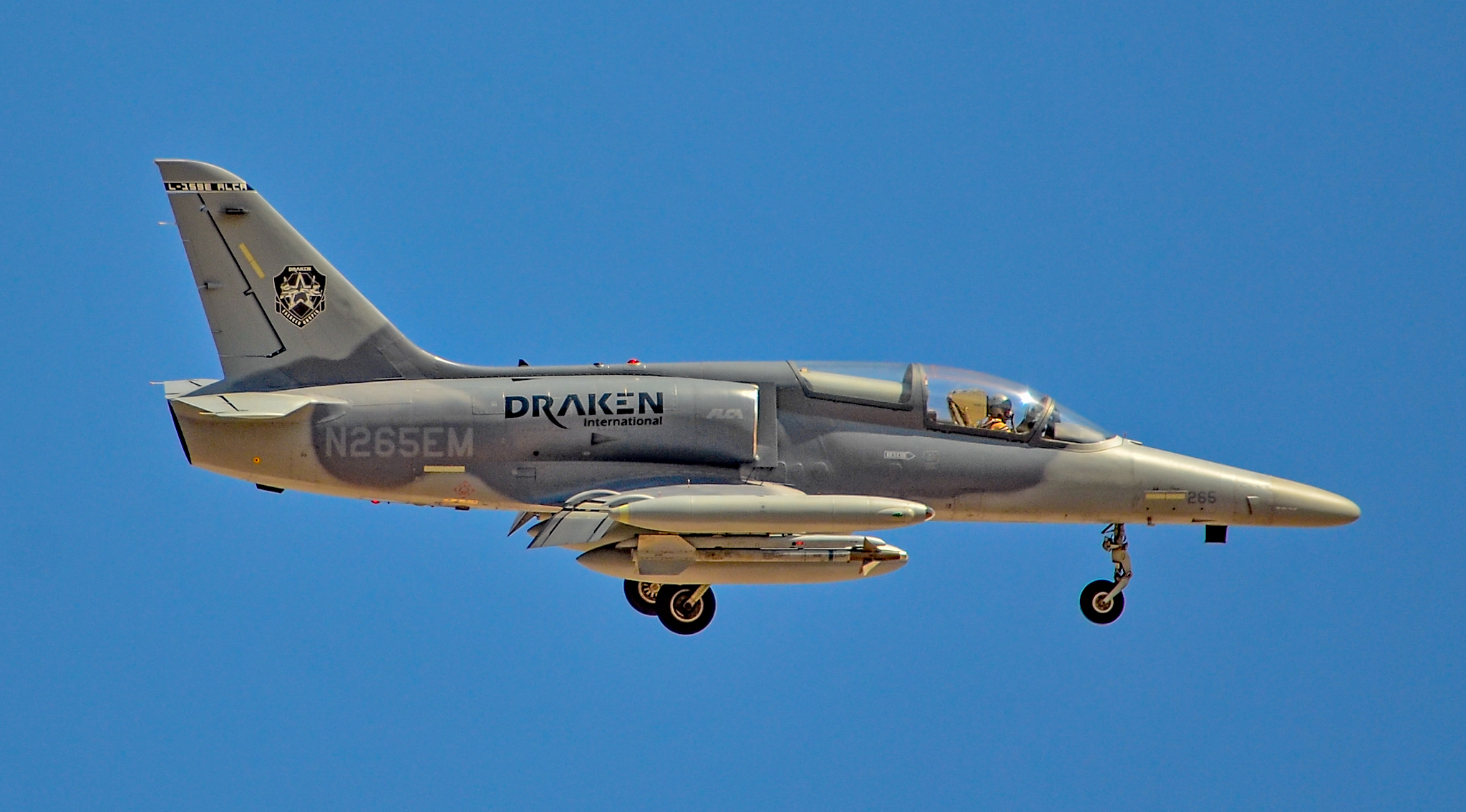
Draken International's L-159E

United Kingdom

- Draken Europe (formerly Cobham) – Fleet of 13 L-159E aircraft from Draken International, listed on the CAA (G-XXXX) registry.

United States

- Draken International – 8 L-159E aircraft.
- Lewis Fighter Fleet LLC – three L-159A aircraft; listed on the FAA registry. The aircraft have no export license from the Italian Government for the Selex Grifo-L radars.

=== Evaluation-only operators ===
Hungary

- Hungarian Air Force – one L-159B leased from 2008 until 2010.

Ireland

- Irish Air Corps – The L-159A was evaluated as a replacement for the six Fouga CM.170 Magisters of the Light Strike Squadron. The Czech Republic offered Ireland 3 L-39ZA for free if Ireland bought six L-159As. The Irish Government chose not to pursue the offer.

=== Potential operators ===
Ukraine

On 11 May 2023, Czech President Petr Pavel, in a radio interview, offered the L-159 to Ukraine. Subject to a decision by the Czech government, President Pavel said “It is worth considering whether we could provide Ukraine with our L-159 aircraft. As direct combat support aircraft, (the planes) could also help Ukraine significantly in the counteroffensive”. They also carry an array of western weapons such as: “AIM-9 Sidewinder missiles, AIM-120 AMRAAM, AGM-65 Maverick, and GBU-12 Paveway II and GBU-16 Paveway II laser-guided bombs.” They also are a Czech aircraft, approval from other countries is not required. It is also an upgrade from the Aero L-39 Albatros that the Ukraine Air Force uses.

On 16 January 2026, Czech president Petr Pavel has pledged to provide Ukraine with “medium combat planes which are highly effective in fighting drones”—this likely refers to the L-159 light fighter jet.

== Specifications (L-159A) ==
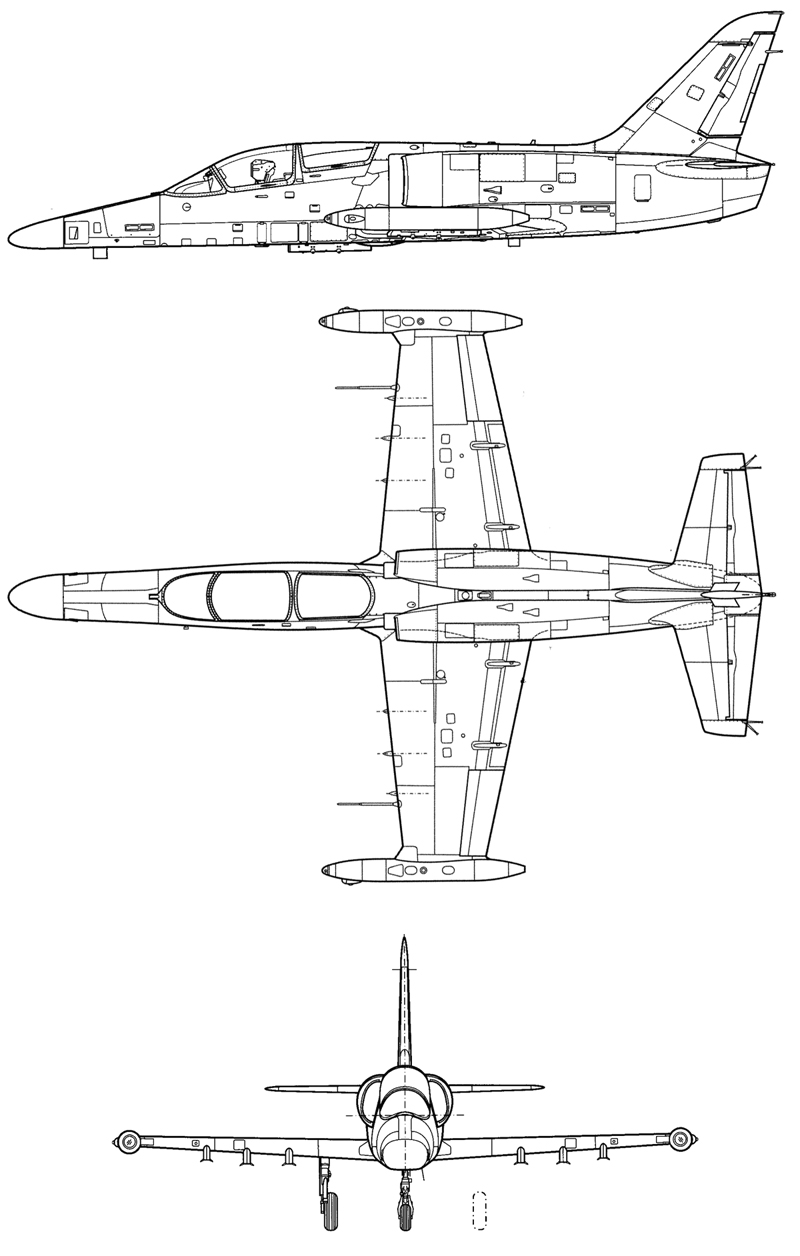

Data from Jane's All The World's Aircraft 2003–2004, Czech military web pages

General characteristics

- Crew: 1 (L-159A), 2 (L-159B, L-159T1/T2)
- Length: 12.72 m (41 ft 9 in)
- Wingspan: 9.54 m (31 ft 4 in) including tip tanks
- Height: 4.87 m (16 ft 0 in)
- Wing area: 18.8 m^{2} (202 sq ft)
- Airfoil: NACA 64A012
- Empty weight: 4,350 kg (9,590 lb)
- Max takeoff weight: 8,000 kg (17,637 lb)
- Powerplant: 1 × Honeywell/ITEC F124-GA-100 turbofan engine, 28.2 kN (6,300 lbf) thrust

Performance

- Maximum speed: 936 km/h (582 mph, 505 kn)
- Never exceed speed: 960 km/h (600 mph, 520 kn)
- Range: 1,570 km (980 mi, 850 nmi)
- Combat range: 565 km (351 mi, 305 nmi) lo-lo-lo, gun pod, 2× Mark 82 bombs, 2× AIM-9 Sidewinder and 2× 500 L (130 US gal; 110 imp gal) drop tanks
- Service ceiling: 13,200 m (43,300 ft)
- Rate of climb: 62 m/s (12,200 ft/min)

Armament

- Guns: up to 3 × ZVI PL-20 Plamen 2×20 mm gun pods
- Hardpoints: 7 in total: 3 under each wing (outer pylons only for AAMs) and 1 under the fuselage holding up to 2,340 kg (5,159 lb)
- Rockets:
  - LAU-5002 rocket pods (each with 6 × CRV7 70 mm rockets)
  - LAU-5003 rocket pods (each with 19 × CRV7 70 mm rockets)
- Missiles:
  - Air-to-air missiles:
    - AIM-9L/M Sidewinder
    - AIM-120 AMRAAM (fitted for but not with)
  - Air-to-ground missiles:
    - AGM-65 Maverick
- Bombs: various laser-guided and unguided bombs GBU, CBU
  - CBU-87 Combined Effects Munition
  - Mark 82 general-purpose bombs
  - Mark 83 general-purpose bombs
  - GBU-12 Paveway II
  - GBU-16 Paveway II
- Others:
  - 2 × 500 L drop tanks (only inner hardpoints) for ferry flights or up to 4 × 350 L drop tanks (inner and middle hardpoints) for tactical missions

Avionics
Grifo-L Radar

== See also ==
Related development

- Aero L-39 Albatros
- Aero L-59 Super Albatros
- Aero L-39 Skyfox

Aircraft of comparable role, configuration, and era

- BAE Systems Hawk
- Dassault/Dornier Alpha Jet
- FMA IA-63 Pampa
- Kawasaki T-4
- Textron AirLand Scorpion
- Yakovlev Yak-130 / Alenia Aermacchi M-346 Master
- Hongdu JL-8
