= Lotarev DV-2 =

Turbofan aircraft engine

DV-2
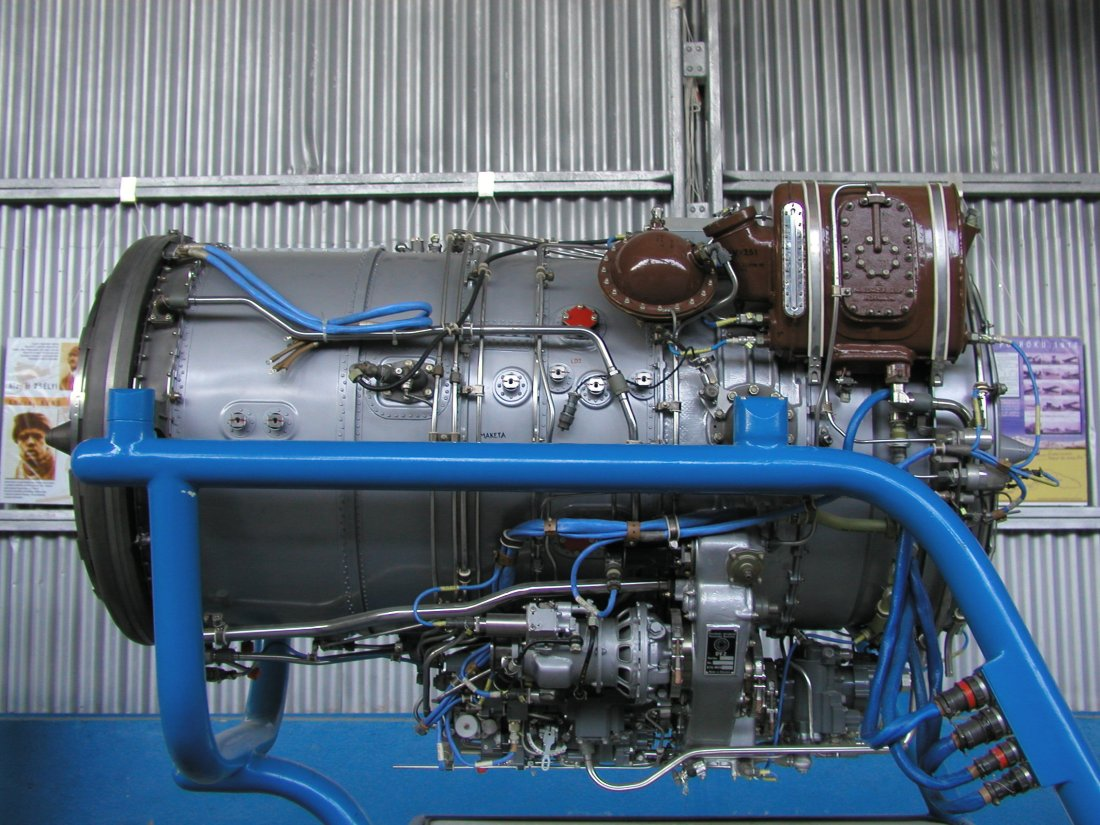
- DV-2 turbofan engine
- Type: Turbofan
- National origin: Soviet Union/Czechoslovakia
- Manufacturer: Ivchenko-Progress/PSLM RD-35 by Klimov
- First run: 1987
- Major applications: L-59 Super Albatros (L-39MS Albatros); Hongdu L-15; Ilyushin Il-108
- Number built: 124
- Developed from: Ivchenko AI-25

The Lotarev DV-2 (or PSLM DV-2, DV: Dnepr-Váh, Ukrainian: Лотарьов ДВ-2) is a two-spool turbofan engine manufactured in Považská Bystrica, Slovakia by Považské Strojárne Letecké Motory (PS Aircraft Engines/Motors) (PSLM) (former ZVL Závody na Výrobu Ložísk "Bearings Production/Manufacturing Plant") and designed in partnership with Ivchenko Lotarev Design Bureau.

== Design and development ==
Developed from the Ivchenko AI-25 turbofan engine, ZVL was also responsible for pre-production and serial engine production.

The DV-2 is a two-spool modular aviation turbofan engine with a single-stage overhung fan, two-stage LP compressor, seven-stage HP compressor, single-stage HP turbine, and two-stage LP turbine, and an annular combustion system. Maximum power at T-O is 21.58 kN (4,850 lb_{f}) with a specific fuel consumption of 60 kg/(kN h) (0.593 (lb/lbf h)), at Maximum Rating, Sea Level Static, ISA.

One of the most unusual features of this military engine is the single stage fan; most trainer and combat engines have multi-staged fans, single stage fans normally being the preserve of civil and military transport turbofans. Ivchenko Lotarev chose a very low specific thrust (net thrust/airflow) cycle for the DV-2, so a single stage fan is sufficient to develop the desired fan pressure ratio. Even so, the pressure ratio produced is somewhat higher than that normally developed by a single stage fan. Owing to the low specific thrust, the bypass ratio for the engine is higher than normal for a military turbofan.

This engine was required to power new versions of the L-39 trainer, L-39MS and L-59. Other turbofan engine models in the DV-2 family include the DV-2A, DV‑2A.2 and DV-2S.

The DV-2S was renamed "RD-35" by the Klimov under license agreement with the PSLM in 1993.

== Applications ==
- L-59 Super Albatros (L-39MS Albatros)
- Hongdu L-15
- Ilyushin Il-108

== Specifications (DV-2S) ==
Data from PSLM website

==== General characteristics ====
- Type: Two-spool low-bypass turbofan engine with a single-stage fan
- Length: 1,72 m (67.7 in)
- Width: 0.82 m (32.2 in)
- Height: 1.04 m (40.9 in)
- Diameter: Fan: 0.64 m (25.2 in)
- Dry weight: 439 kg (967.8 lb)

==== Components ====
- Compressor: Two-stage LP, seven-stage HP
- Combustors: Annular combustion system with 16 fuel injection nozzles
- Turbine: single-stage HP, two-stage LP

==== Performance ====
- Maximum thrust: 2,498 kgf; 5,508 pounds-force (24.50 kN)
- Overall pressure ratio: 15.5
- Bypass ratio: 1.4
- Turbine inlet temperature: 1,440 K
- Specific fuel consumption: 60 kg/(kN h) (0.593lb/(lbf h))
- Thrust-to-weight ratio: 5.69

== See also ==
Related development

- Ivchenko AI-25

Comparable engines

- Garrett F109
- Williams FJ44

Related lists

- List of aircraft engines
