= Ilyushin Il-108 =

Twin-jet business-aircraft project

General information
- Type: Business jet
- Designer: Ilyushin Design Bureau
- Status: Abandoned project

History
- Introduction date: 1990

The Ilyushin Il-108 is a twin-jet business-aircraft project, drafted in 1990 by the Russian manufacturer Ilyushin. A first model was presented in the same year, but apparently no Il-108 ever took to the air. It is similar in appearance to the Canadair Challenger 300.

== Design ==
The draft listed two models, a nine-seater executive aircraft and a 15-passenger commercial aircraft, both low-winged and possessing a T-tail. The Il-108 is powered by two Lotarev DV-2 turbofans attached to the top of the rear fuselage on either side of the tail, each providing a thrust of 21.6 kN.

== Variants ==
A second version was planned to be equipped with Lotarev DV-22 turbofan derivatives having a bypass ratio of 5 and a 35 kN thrust.

== Specifications ==
Data from

General characteristics

- Crew: 2
- Capacity: 1,600 kg (3,527 lb) payload / 9-15 passengers
- Length: 15.85 m (52 ft 0 in)
- Wingspan: 15 m (49 ft 3 in)
- Height: 5.5 m (18 ft 1 in)
- Max takeoff weight: 14,300 kg (31,526 lb)
- Powerplant: 2 × Lotarev DV-2 turbofan engines, 21.6 kN (4,900 lbf) thrust each

Performance

- Range: 5,390 km (3,350 mi, 2,910 nmi) (9-seater)

4,850 km (3,014 mi; 2,619 nmi) (15-seater)
