= Larnaca yacht killings =

Attack on a yacht by gunmen

- Location: Larnaca, Cyprus
- Date: September 25, 1985; 41 years ago c. 4:30
- Weapons: Assault rifles, automatic pistols, hand grenades
- Deaths: 3 civilians
- Perpetrator: Fatah's Force 17
- No. of participants: 3

The Larnaca Yacht killings was a terrorist attack by alleged supporters of the Palestine Liberation Organization in Larnaca, Cyprus on September 25, 1985, followed by a ten-hour standoff with police.

== Incident ==
At roughly 4:30, three gunmen stormed a 12 m (38 feet) yacht carrying in the city's harbour, proceeding to attack the three Israelis on board. Tourist Esther Palzur, dressed in a nightgown, grabbed a knife and tried to fend them off. As the gunmen turned their fire on her, she tried to run up towards the deck but was gunned down before she could escape. The two remaining Israelis, Palzur's husband Reuven and their friend Avraham Avner, were blindfolded and kept as hostages by the terrorists, who threatened to kill them if Israel did not release 20 Palestinians who had been captured by the Israeli Navy.

As Cypriot police surrounded the harbour, turning the crisis into a standoff, the hostage takers threatened to explode the vessel if they were not given their demands by 10:00 am. Their threat never materialized and the deadline passed without issue.

The Egyptian Ambassador in the country was summoned to the scene after the militants made a request. The terrorists, however, refused to let a pair of PLO representatives attend the negotiations.

At 13:55, the attackers finally surrendered and left the boat, blowing kisses and making the V for Victory signs, before they were arrested by the police. The policemen went on to board to discover the two men's blindfolded corpses in the cabin; their feet and hands tied behind their backs. Esther Palzur's body was found lying on the ship's guard rail; her gown torn and a gunshot wound in her stomach.

== Assailants ==
Of the three assailants, two (Nasif Mahmoud and Elias Yehiya) were Palestinians.

The third, who told the police that his name was George Hanna, was actually Ian Michael Davison, who described himself as ''a skinhead, a real young fascist thug'', and had joined the Palestine Liberation Organization after the Sabra and Shatila massacres. He had previously spent some time in South Yemen, and was described as a "fervent supporter" of Yasser Arafat. He was alleged to have been a member of the Force 17 special operations unit, and was a bodyguard for several Palestinian politicians. An investigation by British authorities confirmed that he was a UK citizen. Many of those who knew him described him as a football enthusiast and a skinhead.

== Aftermath ==
Israel voiced "deep shock over the vile murder," vowing that the PLO "[would] not escape punishment. Due to the fact that the shootings occurred on Yom Kippur, the response took later than usual. Israeli authorities asked Cyprus to hand over the perpetrators. As the two countries did not have an extradition deal, this proved difficult to manage.

Cyprus' Interior Minister, Constantinos Michaelides, was horrified by the killings and issued a condemnation of what had happened. Spyros Kyprianou released a statement urging Israelis and Palestinians to keep the Israeli–Palestinian conflict out of Cyprus, adding that Cyprus "unreservedly condemn[ed] the murder of three hostages at Larnaca. This blood feud is no doubt a tragic affair..... I repeat my appeal to all to leave Cyprus entirely out of any disputes and conflicts among them."

The three killers were charged the next month in a Cypriot court, accused of five counts of illegally possessing weapons and three of murder. A Police prosecutor noted that the gunmen had shot the two men in the head while they were blindfolded.

Israeli forces later retaliated with Operation Wooden Leg, in which the Israeli Air Force bombed the PLO headquarters in Tunis. That day, Shimon Peres announced during a speech that Israel had not forgotten "the matter of Larnaca, and we will not forgive."
