= Mohamed Sheikh, Baron Sheikh =

British politician and businessman (1941–2022)

The Right Honourable The Lord Sheikh
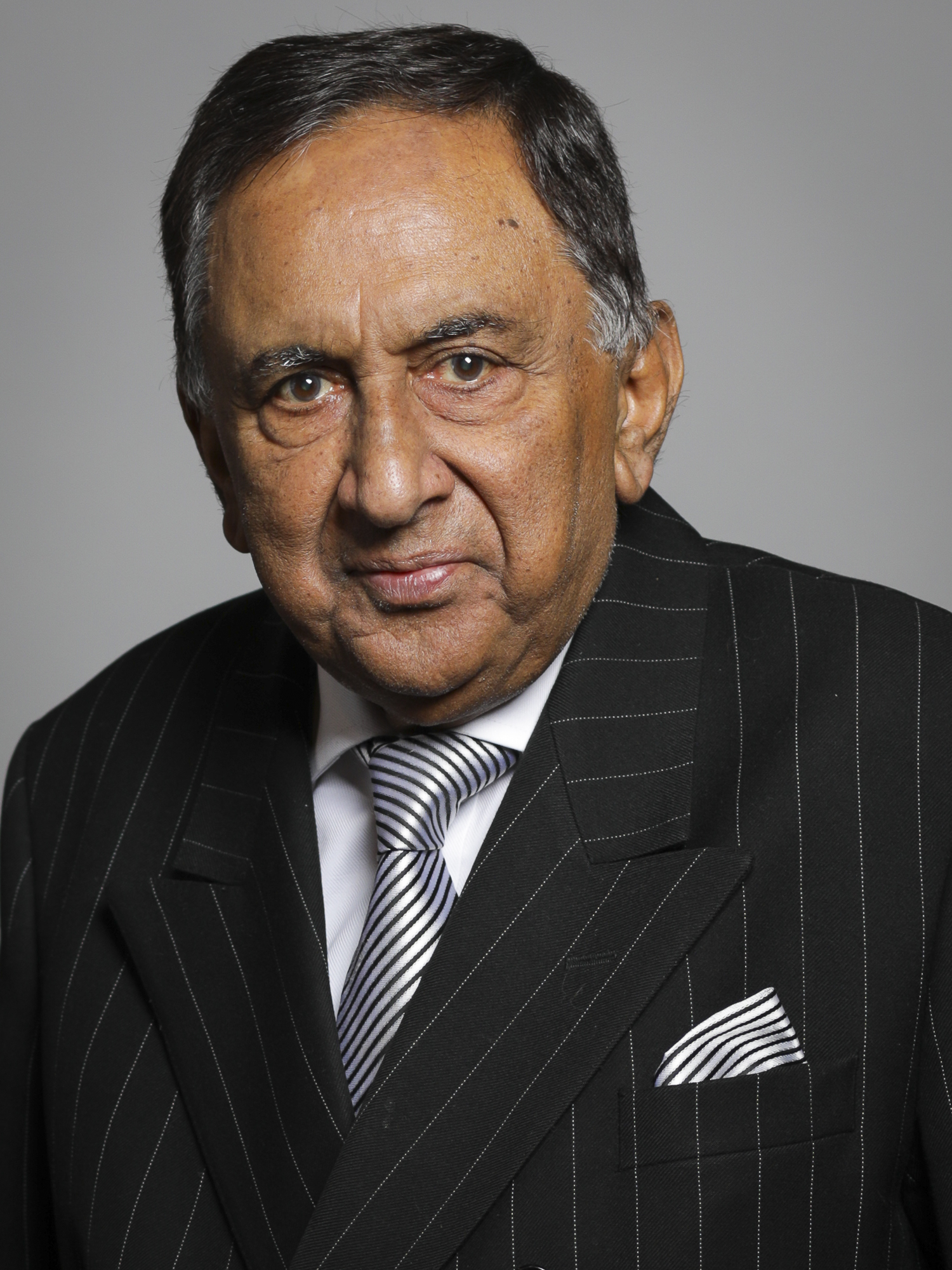
- Official portrait, 2019

Member of the House of Lords
- Lord Temporal
- Life peerage 6 June 2006 – 22 September 2022

Personal details
- Born: 13 June 1941 British Kenya
- Died: 22 September 2022 (aged 81) Southwark, London, England
- Party: Conservative
- Education: City College of London
- Website: www.lordsheikh.com

Mohamed Iltaf Sheikh, Baron Sheikh (13 June 1941 – 22 September 2022) was a British politician and businessman. He was formerly an insurance broker and underwriter.

== Early life and professional career ==
Mohamed Sheikh was born in Kenya and raised in Uganda. He arrived in the UK in 1962 and later studied at the Holborn College of Law, Languages and Commerce and the City College of London. Lord Sheikh then received training at a major insurance company, Sun Alliance and London Group.

Previously, he was the chairman and Chief Executive of Lloyd's Brokers, Camberford Law PLC.

He was also chairman of companies relating to Property and other businesses.

== Barony ==
Lord Sheikh was appointed a life peer in 2006 after he was nominated by Michael Howard MP, then Leader of the Conservative Party. The life barony conferred upon Mohamed Iltaf Sheikh was gazetted on 6 June 2006 by the name, style and title of Baron Sheikh, of Cornhill in the City of London.

He founded and Co-Chaired the All Party Parliamentary Group (APPG) for Islamic and Ethical Finance in British Parliament. He was co-chair of the APPG on Turkey and the Prevention of Genocide and Crimes Against Humanity. He was also a vice-chair of the APPGs on Bangladesh, Ethiopia, Nepal, Kazakhstan and Tajikistan.

== Conservative Party ==
Sheikh first joined the Conservative Party in 2004. He founded the Conservative Muslim Forum and chaired it for several years. He was President of the Forum. He sat on the Conservative benches in the House of Lords and he was actively involved in promoting the Conservative Party to ethnic minorities.

== National Muslim War Memorial Trust ==
Lord Sheikh was the chairman and a founding member of the recently established National Muslim War Memorial Trust.

== Defamation case ==
On 15 August 2018 MailOnline published an article headed "EXCLUSIVE: Top Tory Peer’s appearance at Corbyn's 'hate conference' in Tunisia comes after YEARS of rubbing shoulders with Islamists, hate preachers and Holocaust deniers". This started the Corbyn wreath-laying controversy. Lord Sheikh took action against the publishers, Associated Newspapers Ltd who later accepted fault, admitted their allegations were false, and issued an apology.

== Personal life and death ==
Sheikh was married to Shaida Sheikh in 1985 and Guli Sheikh in 2018. He has a daughter from a previous marriage. He died from cardiogenic shock at London Bridge Hospital in Southwark, London, on 22 September 2022, at the age of 81.

== Arms ==
Coat of arms of Mohamed Sheikh, Baron Sheikh
Adopted 2007 Coronet Coronet of a Baron Crest A peacock in its pride Azure beaked and legged and crested Gules the tail eyed Or the wings displayed and each supporting a quill Argent spined Or. Escutcheon Argent four rows of pallets couped first and third alternately Gules and Azure the second and fourth Azure and Gules over all on a pale Vert a pale Or charged with three crescents Vert. Supporters On either side statant upon an egg Or a dove wings inverted and addorsed Argent beaked and legged Gules. Symbolism The peacock symbolises vision, self-expression, spirituality and integrity. The doves on either side of the crest represent the two doves who nested in front of a cave where Mohammed was hiding from his enemies. The latter seeing the nesting doves assumed that the cave must be empty and so passed by allowing him to remain undiscovered. The crest is a shield with a central golden strip with three green crescents. On either side are rows of books in red and blue. The doves on each side of the shield convey the message that Islam is a religion of peace. It signifies the importance of education as the peacock is holding quill pens. Lord Sheikh's crest says “Iqra” which is Arabic for “Read”, the first word of the Quran to be revealed to Muhammad. The motto emphasises the importance of education.

== Bibliography ==
- Sheikh, Mohamed (2017). Emperor of the five rivers: the life and times of Maharaja Ranjit Singh. London: I.B.Tauris. ISBN 978-1-84885-754-4. OCLC 894340672.
- Sheikh, Mohamed (2019). An Indian In The House: The lives and times of the four trailblazers who first brought India to the British Parliament. [S.l.]: Mereo Books. ISBN 978-1-86151-490-5. OCLC 1080075581.
