= Aero L-59 Super Albatros =

Military jet trainer

L-59 Super Albatros
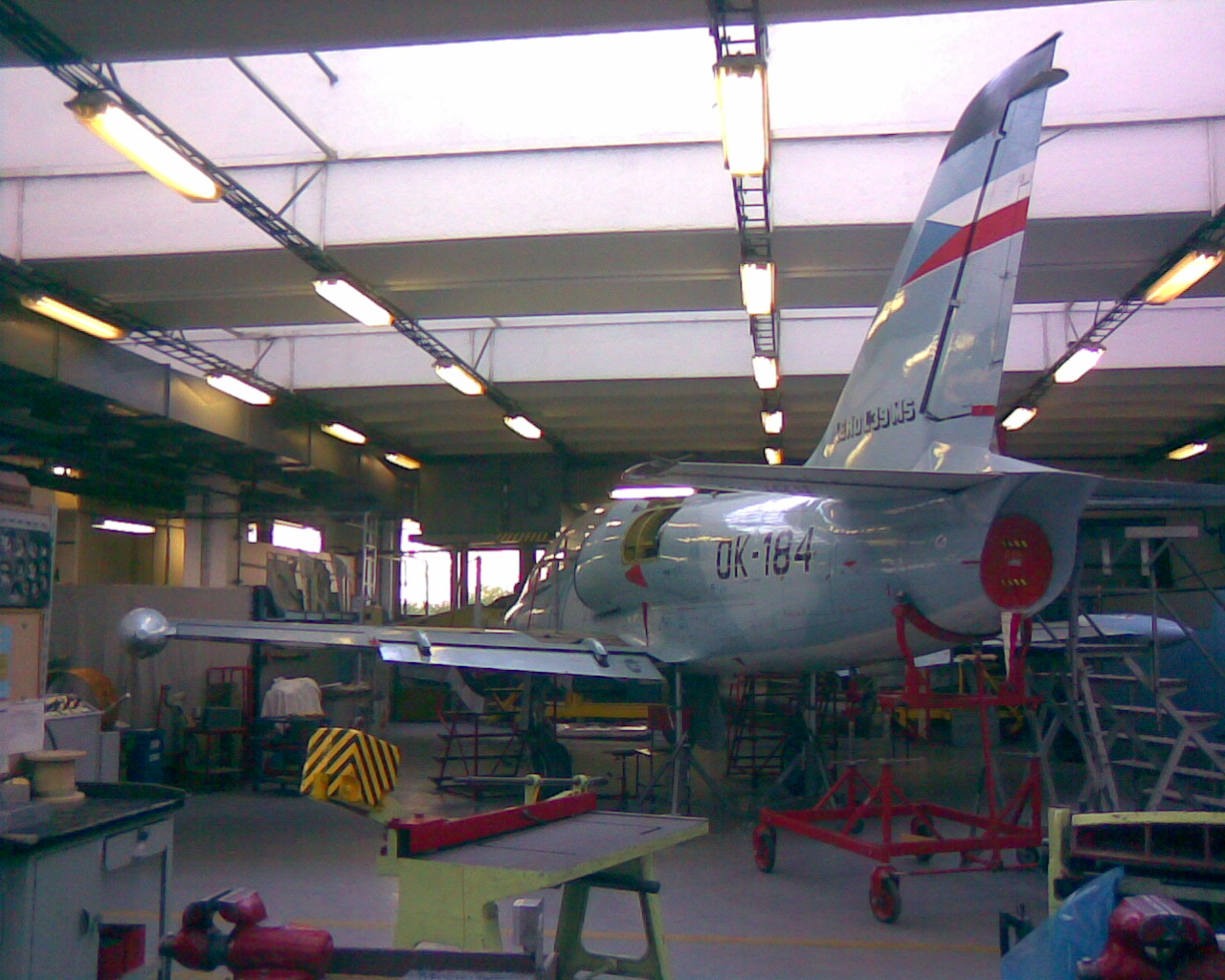
- The first prototype L-39MS designated X-21, is currently in the Odolena Voda Technological Institute as teaching material.

General information
- Type: Military trainer aircraft COIN
- Manufacturer: Aero Vodochody
- Status: Out of production, in service
- Primary users: Czech Air Force Egyptian Air Force; Tunisian Air Force
- Number built: 80

History
- Manufactured: 1986–1996
- First flight: 30 September 1986
- Developed from: Aero L-39 Albatros
- Variant: Aero L-159 ALCA

The Aero L-59 Super Albatros (also known as the L-39MS Albatros) is a military jet trainer produced by the Czechoslovak aerospace manufacturer Aero Vodochody. It was developed from the firm's earlier and highly successful L-39 Albatros series.

Being based on the L-39, it shares numerous similarities; in comparison to its predecessor, the L-59 featured a strengthened fuselage, longer nose, a vastly updated cockpit, advanced avionics, and a more powerful Lotarev DV-2 engine. First flown on 30 September 1986, it was procured by the Czech Air Force, Egyptian Air Force, and Tunisian Air Force; a total of 80 Super Albatros of three variants have been manufactured prior to the end of production. A further development would be produced as the Aero L-159 ALCA, a Westernised attack-orientated model that shared its fuselage configuration with the L-59.

In service, the L-59 has been largely used for training purposes. It has also been deployed in front-line light combat roles, such as to patrol the border between Libya and Tunisia around the height of the First Libyan Civil War. Furthermore, Tunisian Air Force L-59s also performed aerial reconnaissance and ground-attack missions against Ansar al-Sharia and al-Qaeda-linked militants in 2014.

== Development ==
During the 1980s, the Czechoslovak aerospace manufacturer Aero Vodochody was keen to further develop their successful L-39 Albatros, a trainer and light attack aircraft. It decided to produce a derivative with an improved fuselage, an elongated nose, and fitted with a more powerful Lotarev DV-2 turbofan engine capable of generating up to 21.6 kN (4,850 lbf) of thrust. The latter facilitated operations at higher weights, while the aircraft also had a higher maximum speed having risen to 872 km/h (542 mph). The new aircraft was also furnished with more capable avionics and a vastly updated cockpit, which included a head-up display. At first, the aircraft was designed to be exclusively a trainer, but after reconsideration it was decided it would be a light attack aircraft and trainers with the designation L-39MS (Modernization Super). Some time after conducting its maiden flight on 30 September 1986, the aircraft was redesignated as the L-59. Export versions of the aircraft would also carry the L-59 designation.

During 1992, a dedicated single-seat attack variant was proposed under the project name ALCA (Advanced Light Combat Aircraft); it was successfully marketed to the Czech Air Force. Designated L-159A, the first flight of this variant was conducted on 2 August 1997. It features mostly Western avionics, with systems integration undertaken by Boeing. Furthermore, a new two-seat trainer has been flown as the L-159B Albatros II.

By 2013, Aero's official website stated that the L-59 was no longer in production or available from the company. Services provided for the type included the provision of spare parts, service-life extensions, special repairs, overhauls, modifications and upgrades.

== Operational history ==
Initial deliveries of the L-59 were made to the Czechoslovak Air Force, who briefly operated a small fleet of six L-39MS prior to the nation's separation into the Czech Republic and Slovakia; consequently, these aircraft were divided between the Czech Air Force and the Slovak Air Force. The L-59's most numerous operator, and its first export customer, was the Egyptian Air Force; a total of 69 L-59E aircraft would be delivered to the service. Early Egyptian operations encountered poor engine reliability; this matter let to a contract to the American aerospace firm AlliedSignal to produce an improved digital engine control system. The type had reportedly been intended for use as a lead-in-fighter trainer for the service's General Dynamics F-16 Fighting Falcon and Dassault Mirage 2000 fleets, and were equipped to be armed with Eastern-supplied weaponry. However, the Egyptian Air Force L-59s saw little use, allegedly being placed into storage around 1999.

During the early to mid 1990s, various export opportunities were pursued by Aero Vodochody for the L-59, complimenting its continued sales efforts with the L-39 predecessor. One opportunity pursued was the Royal Australian Air Force's lead-in fighter-trainer requirement, an effort which would ultimately be unsuccessful. There were also proposed variants, such as the L-59F, that were to be provisioned with equipment from overseas suppliers, such as avionics from the Israeli company Elbit, and adoption of the American-Taiwanese Honeywell/ITEC F124 turbofan engine in place of the Lotarev DV-2 of earlier variants.

In 1995, deliveries of L-59Ts commenced to the Tunisian Air Force, a total of 12 were delivered to the service. The type has been typically used for advanced pilot training and weapons training purposes, with a secondary focus on conducting light combat operations as well. During the First Libyan Civil War in 2011, Tunisian L-59s commonly flew armed patrol missions along the country's border with Libya. During April 2014, a number of Tunisian L-59s performed multiple reconnaissance missions and counter-insurgency (COIN) strikes in support of major military offensives in the border region of Mount Chaambi against Ansar al-Sharia and al-Qaeda-linked militants that aimed to destabilize Tunisia's transition to democracy. In 2022, it was speculated that Tunisia's L-59T fleet would be rapidly replaced in the near future, the Boeing–Saab T-7 Red Hawk has been suggested as a candidate.

== Variants ==
L-59
Standard production version (six L-39MS for the Czechoslovak Air Force). Later, four aircraft were operated by the Czech Air Force, and two in the Slovak Air Force.
L-59E
Export version for Egypt. 49 L-59s for the Egyptian Air Force.
L-59F
Proposed version furnished with an Elbit avionics package and powered by a Honeywell/ITEC F124 engine.
L-59T
Export version for Tunisia. 12 L-59s for the Tunisian Air Force.

== Operators ==
Czech Republic

- Czech Air Force – four inherited from the Czechoslovak Air Force.

Czechoslovakia

- Czechoslovak Air Force - six delivered between 1992 and 1993.

Egypt

- Egyptian Air Force - 48 delivered between 1993 and 1994.

Slovakia

- Slovak Air Force - two inherited from the Czechoslovak Air Force.

Tunisia

- Tunisian Air Force - 12 delivered between 1995 and 1996.

== Specifications (L-59E) ==
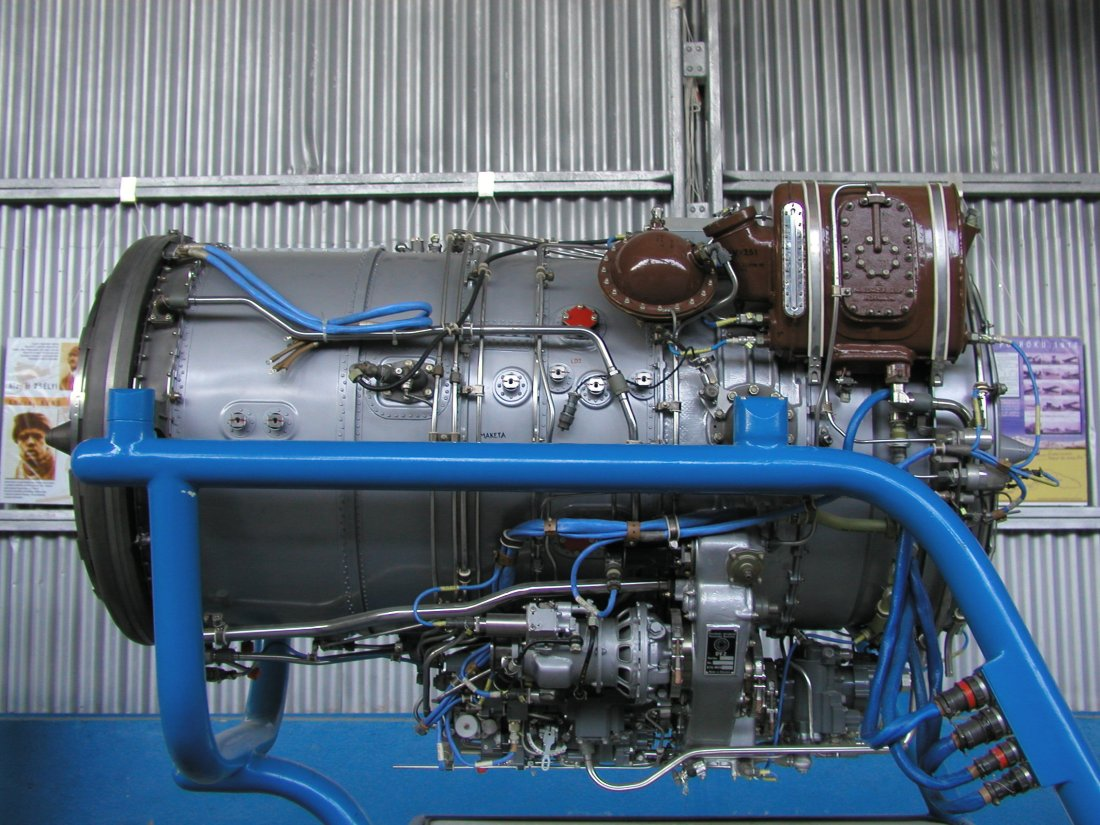
Lotarev DV-2 turbofan engine

Data from Jane's All The World's Aircraft 1993–94

General characteristics

- Crew: 2
- Length: 12.20 m (40 ft 0 in)
- Wingspan: 9.54 m (31 ft 4 in) (including tip tanks)
- Height: 4.77 m (15 ft 8 in)
- Wing area: 18.80 m^{2} (202.4 sq ft)
- Empty weight: 4,030 kg (8,885 lb) (includes gun)
- Max takeoff weight: 7,000 kg (15,432 lb)
- Fuel capacity: 1,537 L (406 US gal; 338 imp gal) including tip tanks
- Powerplant: 1 × Lotarev DV-2 turbofan, 21.57 kN (4,850 lbf) thrust

Performance

- Maximum speed: 865 km/h (537 mph, 467 kn) at 5,000 m (16,000 ft)
- Stall speed: 185 km/h (115 mph, 100 kn) (flaps down)
- Range: 2,000 km (1,200 mi, 1,100 nmi) at 7,000 m (23,000 ft) (with maximum internal and external fuel)
- Service ceiling: 11,800 m (38,700 ft)
- Rate of climb: 28.0 m/s (5,510 ft/min)

Armament

- Guns: one GSh-23L cannon in under-fuselage pod
- Hardpoints: four underwing hardpoints with a capacity of inner hardpoints 500 kg (1,100 lb)capacity, outer hardpoints 250 kg (550 lb)

== See also ==
Related development

- Aero L-159 ALCA

Aircraft of comparable role, configuration, and era

- BAe Hawk
- IAR 99 Şoim
- Mikoyan MiG-AT
- Soko G-4 Super Galeb
- Yakovlev Yak-130
- PZL I-22 Iryda
