= United Nations Security Council Resolution 573 =

UN Security Council Resolution 573
- Tunisia
- Date: 4 October 1985
- Meeting no.: 2,615
- Code: S/RES/573 (Document)
- Subject: Israel–Tunisia
- Voting summary: 14 voted for; None voted against; 1 abstained
- Result: Adopted

Security Council composition
- Permanent members: China; France; Soviet Union; United Kingdom; United States
- Non-permanent members: Australia; Burkina Faso; Denmark; Egypt; India; Madagascar; Peru; Thailand; Trinidad and Tobago; Ukrainian SSR

United Nations Security Council resolution 573, adopted on 4 October 1985, after hearing a complaint by Tunisia, the Council condemned an air raid on the country by the Air Force of Israel on 1 October. The Palestine Liberation Organization (PLO) headquarters was targeted in the attack, after Israel had responded to the murder of three Israeli citizens in Cyprus.

The Council reminded States to refrain from threats or the use of force in their international relations, in accordance with the United Nations Charter. Considering that Israel had admitted to the attack immediately after carrying it out, the Council demanded that Israel refrain from further such attacks, urging Member States to dissuade Israel from doing so. It also noted that Tunisia had the right to reparations considering the loss of life and material damage caused.

Finally, Resolution 573 requested the Secretary-General to submit a report on the implementation of the current resolution by 30 November 1985.

The resolution was adopted by 14 votes to none, with one abstention from the United States.

== See also ==
- Arab–Israeli conflict
- List of United Nations Security Council Resolutions 501 to 600 (1982–1987)
- Operation Wooden Leg
- United Nations Security Council Resolution 611
