= Hammam Chott =

- Commune and town
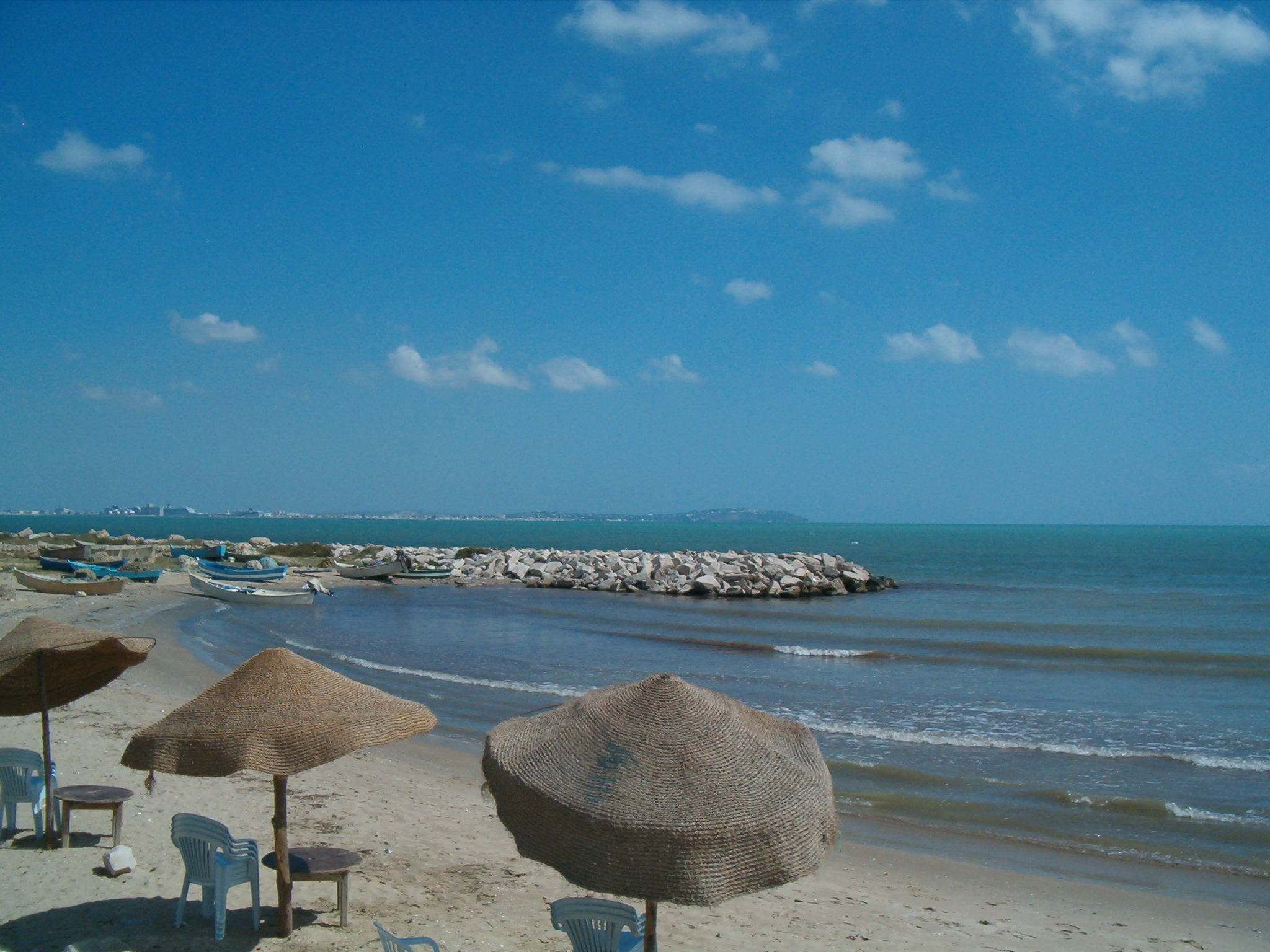
- Hammam Chott

- Location within Tunisia
- Coordinates: 36°43′18″N 10°21′30″E
- Country: Tunisia
- Governorate: Ben Arous Governorate

Population (2022)
  - Total: 37,236
- Time zone: UTC+1 (CET)

Hammam Chott (Arabic: حَمَّام الشَّطّ, romanized: Ḥammām Aš-Šaṭṭ; IPA: [ħam.maːm aʃ.ʃatˤtˤ]) is a town and commune in the Ben Arous Governorate, Tunisia. It is located 20 kilometers from the capital, Tunis, in the southern suburbs. It is a seaside resort town.

The Palestine Liberation Organization (PLO) had its headquarters in Hammam Chott before an Israeli bombing attack in 1985.

On 1 October 1985, the PLO headquarters in Hammam Chott was bombed and destroyed by the Israeli Air Force in Operation Wooden Leg.

== Origin of name ==
Chott in Arabic means "beach" which is appropriate due to Hammam Chott's location on the Gulf of Tunis.

== See also ==
- List of cities in Tunisia
