= Operation Wooden Leg =

1985 Israeli attack against the PLO

Coordinates: 36.72052°N 10.37032°E

- Part of the Israeli–Palestinian conflict
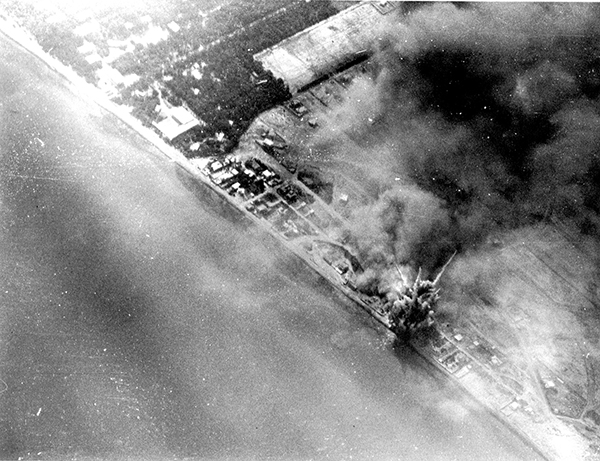
- PLO headquarters under attack during the operation
- Operational scope: Strategic
- Location: Tunis, Tunisia
- Planned by: Israeli Air Force
- Objective: Destroy PLO headquarters in Hammam Chott
- Date: October 1, 1985
- Executed by: Eight F-15 Eagles
- Outcome: United Nations Security Council Resolution 573; UN Security Council voted to condemn the attack as a flagrant violation of the UN Charter; UNSC declared that Tunisia had the right to reparations; United States abstained
- Casualties: 47–71 killed, 65–100 wounded

Operation Wooden Leg (Hebrew: מבצע רגל עץ, Mivtza Regel Etz) was an Israeli airstrike on the Palestine Liberation Organization (PLO) headquarters in Hammam Chott, near Tunis, Tunisia, on 1 October 1985. With a target 1,280 miles (2,060 km) from the operation's starting point, this was the most distant publicly known action undertaken by the Israel Defense Forces since the Entebbe raid in 1976. The airstrike killed between 41 and 71 people and injured between 65 and 100. According to some sources, between 60 and 70 Palestinians and 25 Tunisians were killed. On 4 October, the airstrike was condemned by the United Nations Security Council.

== Background ==
After being driven out of Lebanon in the 1982 Lebanon War, the PLO moved its headquarters to Tunisia.

In April 1985, a PLO plan for a major seaborne attack on Israel was thwarted. Under the plan, PLO fighters would travel to the Israeli coast in a freighter and land in rubber dinghies, then hijack a bus or two and force the drivers to transport them to the Kirya, the Israeli military headquarters in Tel Aviv, where they would kill the sentries and storm the compound, killing as many people as they could and trying to target the Minister of Defense and Chief of Staff. They would then take hostages and bargain for the release of Palestinian prisoners from Israeli prisons. Israeli military intelligence was aware of the plan and the Israeli Navy subsequently thwarted it. On 20 April, the Atavarius, a ship carrying the PLO raiding force, was intercepted and sunk by two Israeli missile boats. Twenty PLO fighters were killed and eight captured. In a subsequent raid on 24 April, four Israeli missile boats and Shayetet 13 commandos sank the Moonlight, another ship leased for the operation, at its dock in Algeria.

In the aftermath of the incident, Israeli Defense Minister Yitzhak Rabin ordered plans drawn up for a retaliatory operation against the PLO's base in Tunisia. Under one proposal, Israel would launch a major seaborne commando raid, with about a hundred commandos from the Sayeret Matkal, Shayetet 13, and Shaldag units landing on the Tunisian shore in rubber dinghies launched from navy vessels and raiding the PLO compound. Another proposal was a bombing run by Israeli fighter jets to destroy it. Training began for both plans pending cabinet approval.

There were tactical and strategic problems with both options. The sheer distance from Israel complicated the options for a combined-arms ground attack. It would be difficult to extract the commandos if the operation went poorly and the chances of casualties were high. On the other hand, Israel had little intelligence on Tunisian and Libyan air defenses. Israel had requested the intelligence from the United States, but the US government turned down the request. In the end, the intelligence was obtained through Jonathan Pollard, a US naval intelligence analyst who spied for Israel.

Although the Israeli government had obtained sufficient intelligence to conduct an air attack, it still hesistated to approve it. Meanwhile, General Yitzhak Mordechai, who had been designated to command the land incursion, pressed for it to go ahead, but Rabin was worried about the chances of something going wrong and Mordechai was unable to assure him that such a thing would not happen. Due to the tactical and diplomatic risks, it was decided to indefinitely postpone the operation.

On 9 September 1985, the Israeli Navy captured four senior commanders of the PLO's elite Force 17 unit, among them its deputy commander Faisal Abu Sharah. They had been traveling from Cyprus to Lebanon on the ship Opportunity, when it was stopped by an Israeli patrol boat with Mossad agents on board. They were arrested by Shayetet 13 commandos, taken to Israel and interrogated. Sharah was later tried and given a heavy prison sentence. Since then, the Israeli Navy and the Mossad had intercepted several other vessels and arrested passengers suspected of terrorist activity.

On 25 September 1985, in response to the arrests of the four Force 17 commanders, the PLO carried out the Larnaca yacht killings. Three gunmen hijacked a yacht off the coast of Larnaca, Cyprus, and killed three Israeli nationals on board. The victims were Reuven Paltsur, 53, his wife Esther 50, both of Haifa, and their friend Avraham Avneri, 53, of Arad who had taken a vacation cruise to nearby Cyprus marina, a popular spot for Israelis. Paltsur, who owned the yacht, was described as a dedicated sailor, active in the Sea Scouts and other movements promoting seafaring among Israelis.

The heavily armed perpetrators were Elias Yehiya and Nasif Mahmoud and George Hannah, all who self-identified as Palestinian and committed the act in the name of Palestinian nationalism. The latter was identified as British citizen lan Michael Davison who had joined the PLO cause and fought alongside Yasser Arafat two years prior. The other two said they were from Lebanon.

An anonymous caller told the Jerusalem office of Agence France-Presse that the attack was carried out by Force 17. However, PLO officials denied that. The Israelis were allowed to write down their final thoughts before being shot. The nature of the killings provoked widespread shock in Israel. The PLO claimed that the victims were Mossad agents monitoring Palestinian naval traffic out of Cyprus.

Israel asked for the extradition of the killers, but Cyprus authorities preferred to have them tried in their country.

The Israeli cabinet desired immediate retaliation and the plan for an air attack on the PLO's Tunis headquarters was reactivated. In an emergency meeting, the 10-member inner cabinet approved the attack with only Ezer Weizmann dissenting. Gordon Thomas claimed in his controversial book Gideon's Spies that many of the subsequent stories in the Arab press warning of Israeli retaliation were planted by LAP, the Mossad's department of psychological warfare.

On the eve of the attack, Tunisia expressed concern to the United States that it might be attacked by Israel. However, the United States, according to a high-ranking Tunisian official, assured Tunisia there was no reason to worry.

== Operation ==
The strike was carried out by ten two-seat F-15B/D Eagle Baz, six from 106 "Edge of Spear" Squadron and four from 133 "Knights of the Twin Tail" Squadron. Eight of the jets would attack the target with two remaining as backup. The attack was led by Lieutenant Colonel Avner Naveh. At 07:00 on 1 October, the aircraft took off from Tel Nof Airbase. Two Boeing 707 tankers accompanied the fighters to refuel them mid-flight over the Mediterranean en route to the target and again while returning from the mission while another Boeing served as an airborne command, control, and communications center. Two E-2C Hawkeye early warning planes were deployed to jam Tunisian, Libyan, and Algerian radars. The Israeli Navy stationed a helicopter-carrying vessel near Malta to recover downed pilots, but this was never needed.

The route was designed to avoid detection by Egyptian and Libyan radars and United States Navy vessels patrolling the Mediterranean. Israeli Air Force commander Amos Lapidot saw little chance of resistance from the Tunisian Air Force or Tunisian air defenses, but believed that on such a long flight, technical problems could arise. After the first refueling halfway to the target and because no problems had occurred up to that point, the two F-15s in reserve returned to Israel.

Shortly before the arrival there was another refueling and then the remaining eight F-15 fighter bombers flew in two groups low over the shore and each dropped one GBU-15 precision-guided munition on the PLO headquarters, a cluster of sand-colored buildings along the seaside. Each bomb was then guided to the target using a TV guidance head by the Weapon systems officer (WSO) sitting in the back. The planes attacked the southern location first, so that the northern wind would not pull smoke over the northern targets. The attack lasted for six minutes, after which the strike force returned to Israel.

Symbol of Operation Wooden Leg attached to the F-15 jets involved

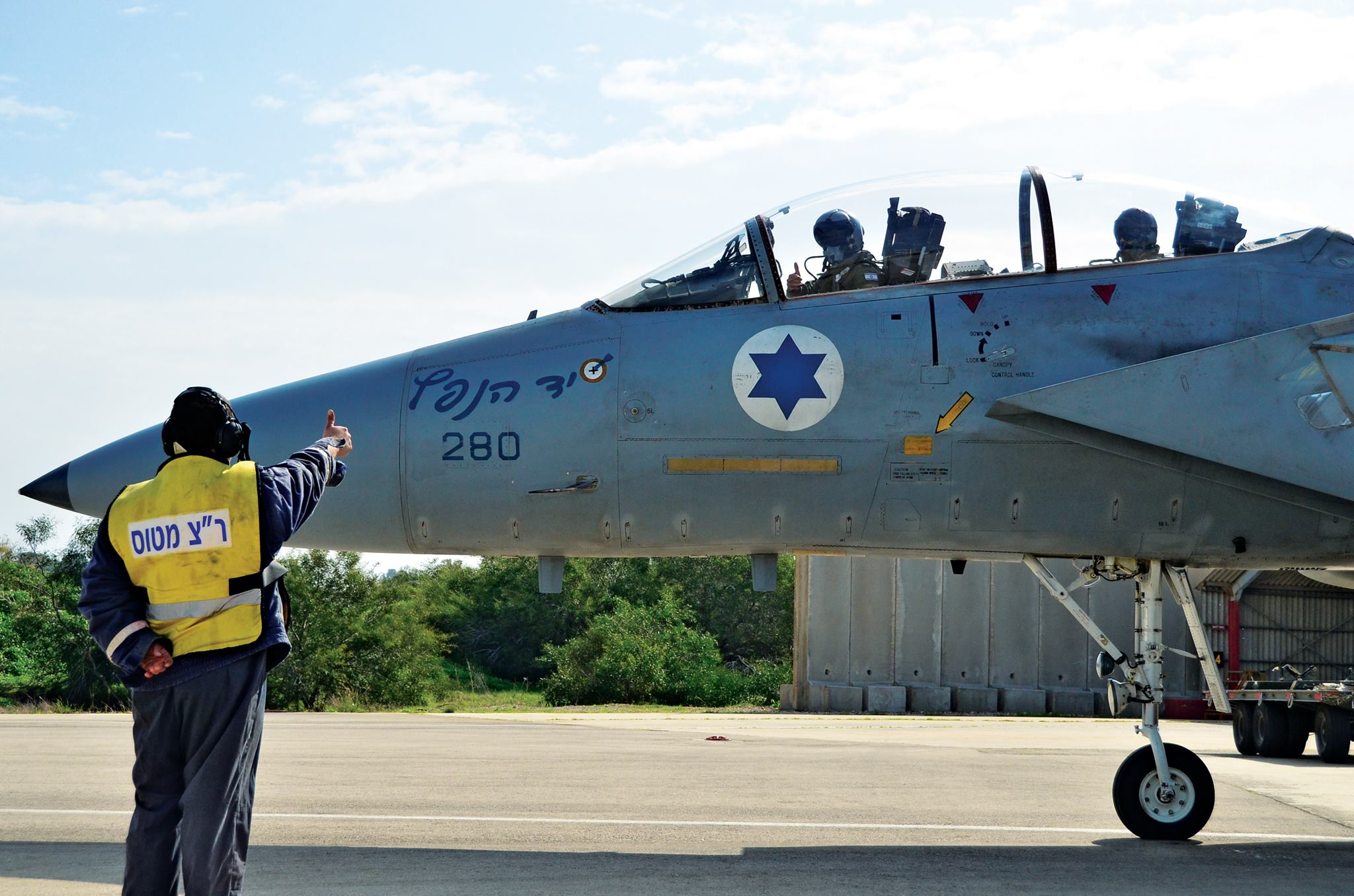
One of the involved F-15D Eagle Baz #280 with the symbol in 2015

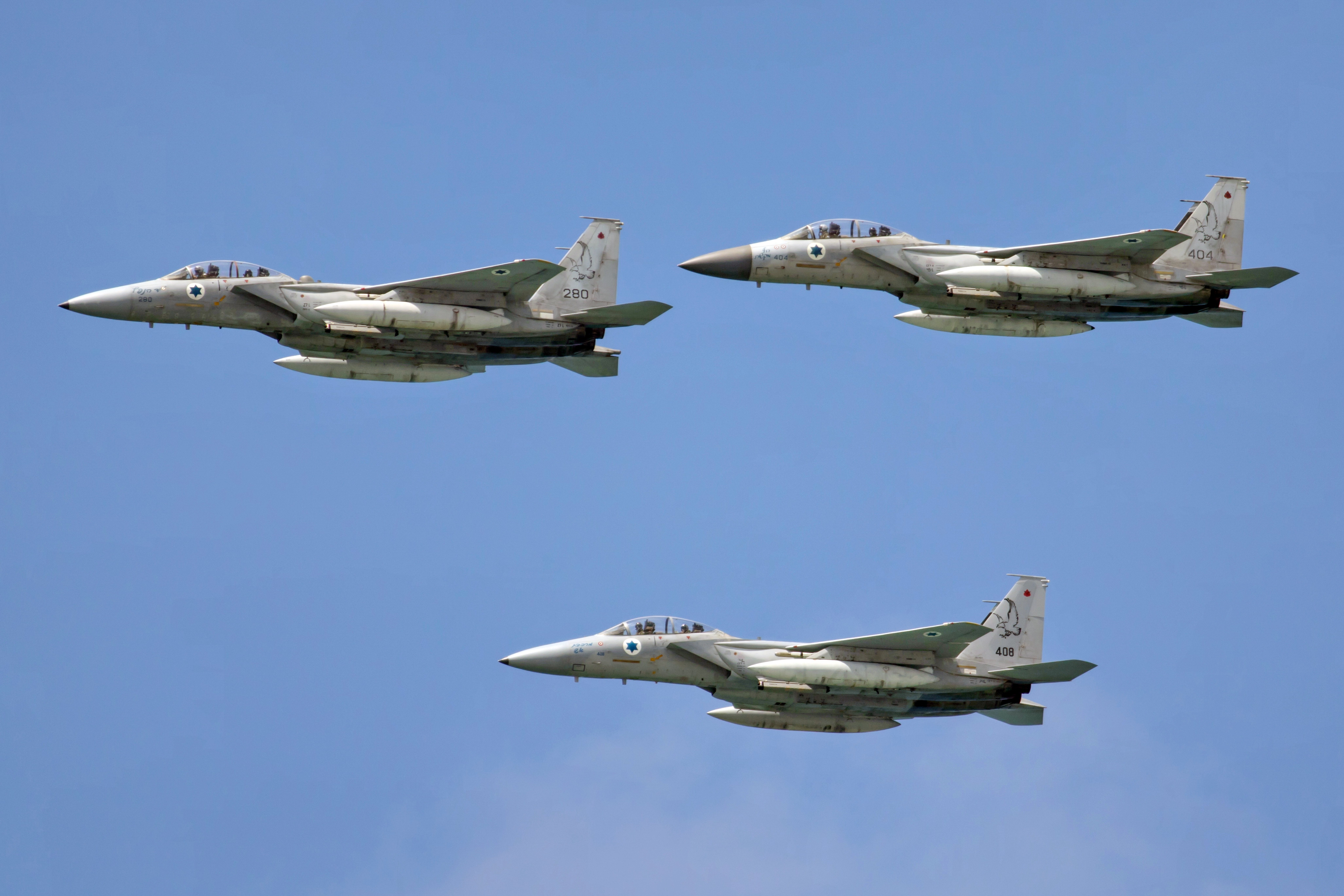
The involved F-15D Baz #280 (left) in formation with others in 2015

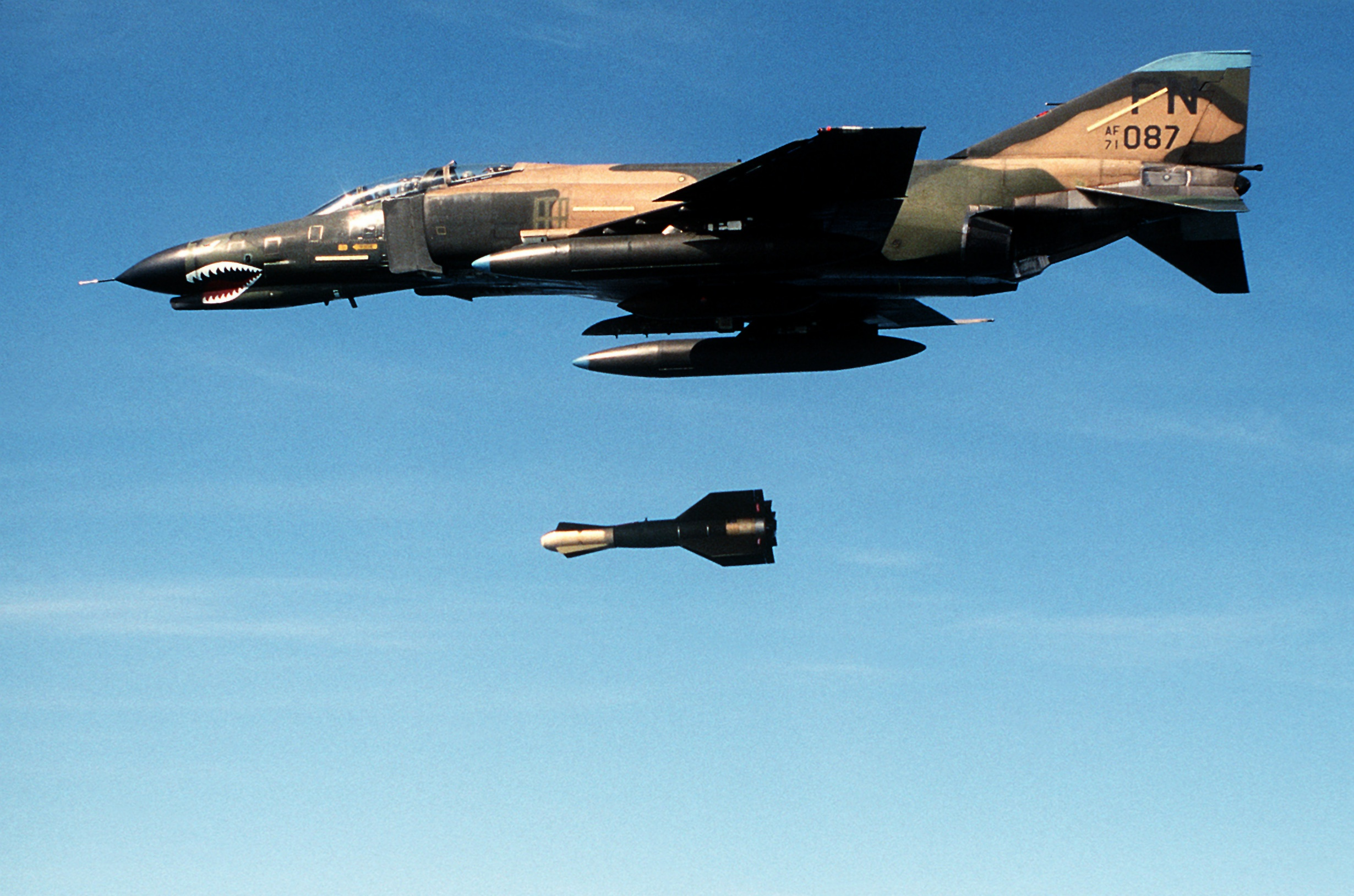
A GBU-15 bomb with TV guidance dropped by an F-4E in 1985

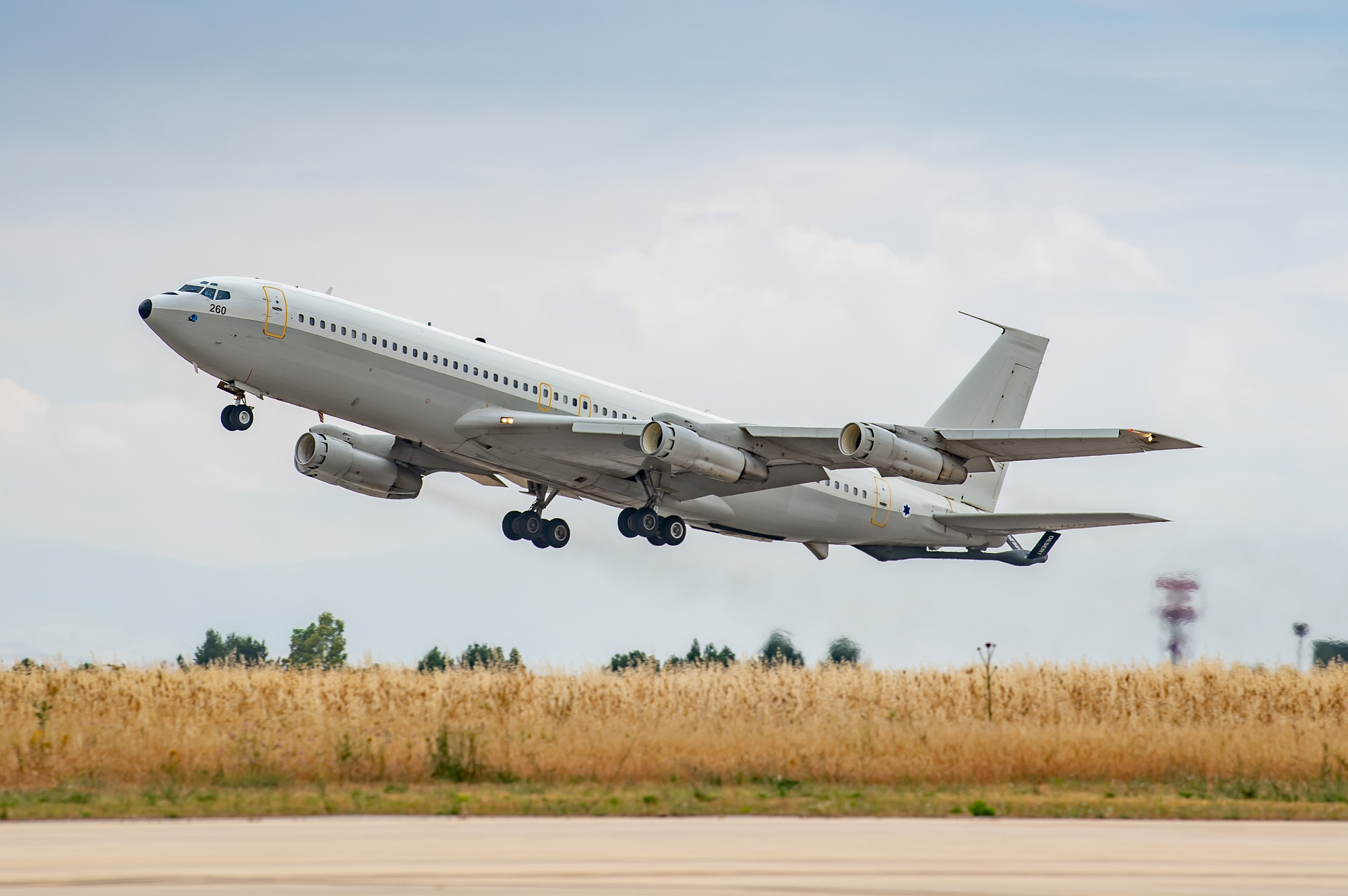
A Boeing 707 Re'em tanker at takeoff somewhere in Italy in 2021

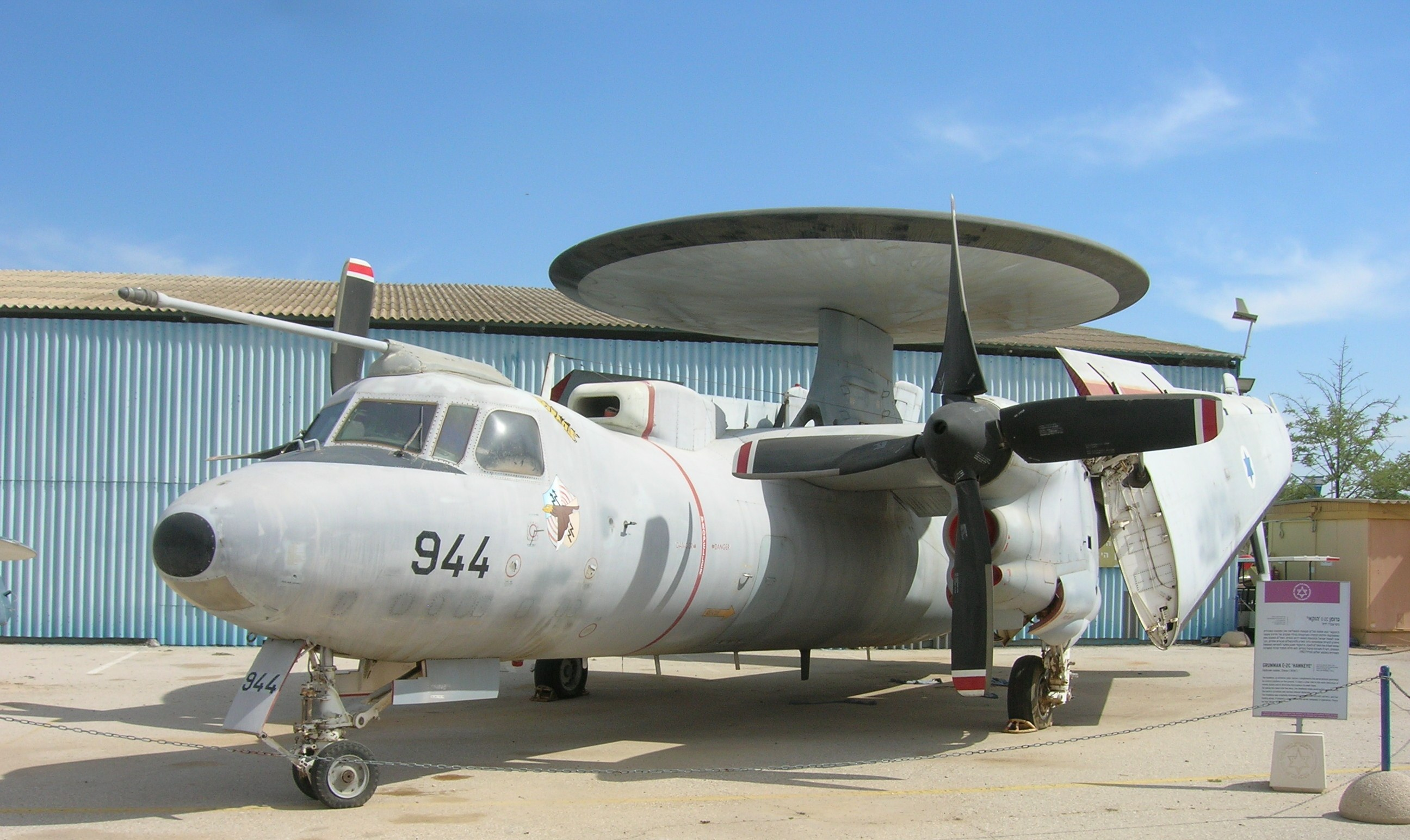
E-2C Hawkeye at the IAF Museum near Hatzerim Airbase in 2007

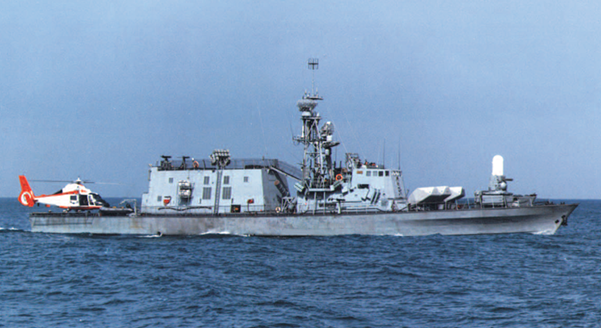
A Sa'ar 4.5-class missile boat with SAR helicopter in 1985

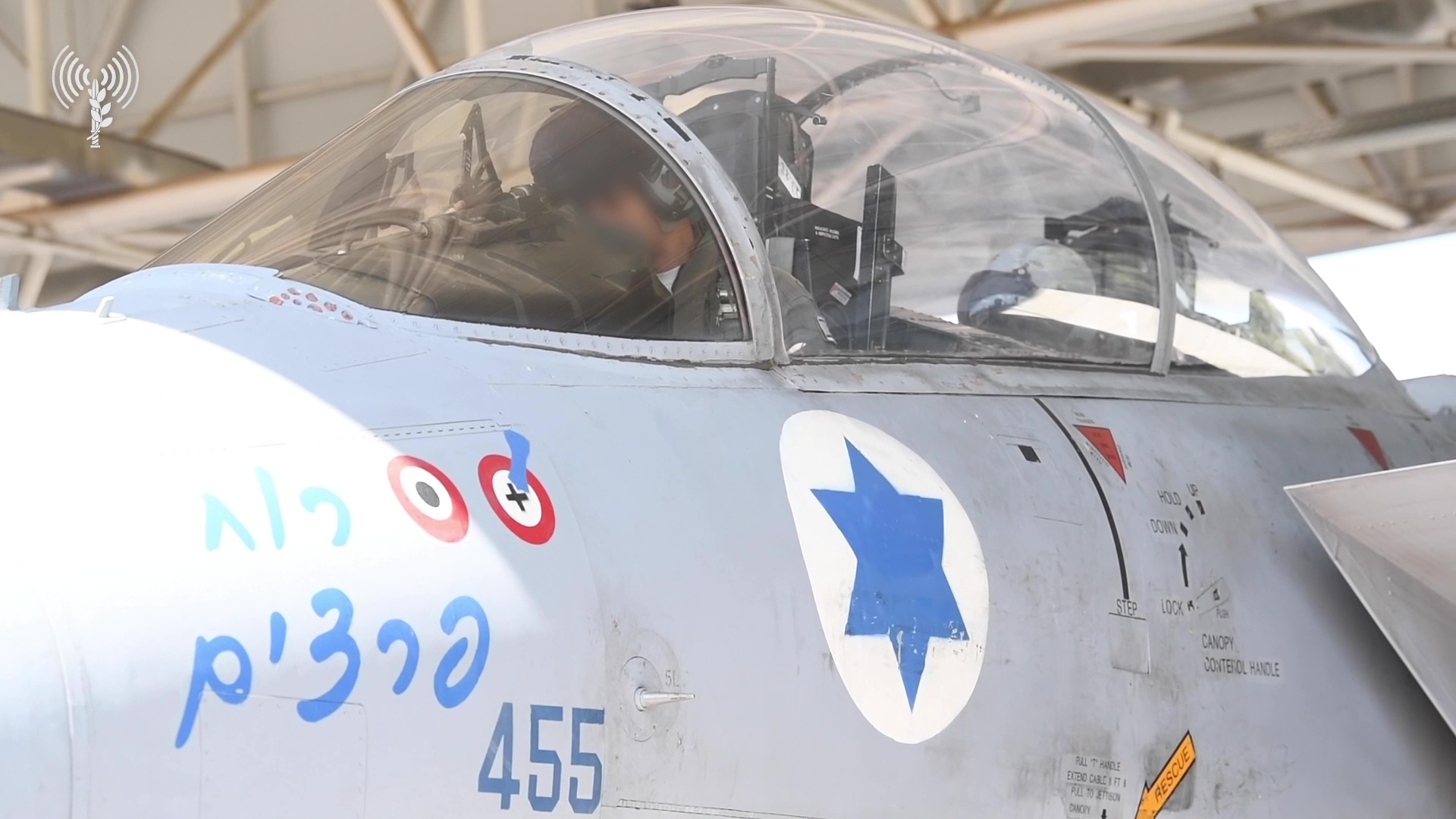
The F-15D Baz #455 of Operation Wooden Leg at Tel Nof in 2024

The PLO headquarters were completely destroyed, although Yasser Arafat, the head of the organization, was not there at the time. Israel claimed that some 60 PLO members were killed, including several leaders of Force 17, and several of Arafat's bodyguards. In addition, the operation resulted in casualties among civilian bystanders. According to other sources, 56 Palestinians and 15 Tunisians were killed and about 100 wounded. Hospital sources put the final count at 47 dead and 65 wounded. Amnon Kapeliouk, who was a close friend of Yasser Arafat and a founder of the Israeli advocacy group B'tselem, was the only Israeli reporter allowed to report from the scene.

Because the attack was conducted so far from Israel, Tunisian President Habib Bourguiba said in a 1990 article that he believed that attack plan must have been known of by the United States, if not actually involving American collaboration.

== Aftermath ==
The attack provoked a strong backlash, even in the United States, Israel's strongest ally. Though initially labeling the strike a "legitimate response to terror", the Reagan administration later said the attack "cannot be condoned". The attack also harmed relations between the US administration and the Tunisian president, Habib Bourguiba. Believing the US knew about the attack, and was possibly involved, Tunisia considered breaking diplomatic ties with the US. The Tunisian Ambassador to France described the attack as "state terrorism" citing the number of deaths including civilians and Tunisian security forces.

Egypt suspended negotiations with Israel over the disputed border town of Taba. Israeli Prime Minister Shimon Peres was quoted as saying "It was an act of self-defense. Period."

In the United Nations Security Council Resolution 573 (1985), the Security Council voted (with the United States abstaining) to condemn the attack on Tunisian territory as a flagrant violation of the United Nations Charter and considered that Tunisia had the right to appropriate reparations.

Following the arrest of Jonathan Pollard in November 1985, it was reported that Israeli reprisal was assisted thanks to satellite images that Pollard transmitted to Israel. In Pollard's court defense memorandum, he stated that his Israeli handlers "stressed the fact that the mission could not have been undertaken without the information I made available".

Within Tunisia, there was public outrage. For a week after the attack, the country's small Jewish community found itself the target of individual acts of antisemitism, such as insults and stone-throwing against Jewish shops. On 8 October 1985, on the island of Djerba, a Tunisian police officer whose brother had been killed at the PLO headquarters fired into the El Ghriba synagogue during Simchat Torah services, killing 5-year-old Yoav Hadad, 14-year-old Yehudit Bucharis and 56-year-old Haim Cohen.

It is possible that Israel attempted a similar attack in Algeria in 1988. Following Operation Wooden Leg, the PLO searched for an alternative location to hold its next congress, as it was assumed that Israel would launch a similar attack against it. The PLO's congress was ultimately held at the Club des Pins Hotel near Algiers. As it was assumed that Israel would launch a similar raid, the Algerian military established a twenty-kilometer no-fly zone around the Club Des Pins, stationed an anti-aircraft missile battery nearby, and kept four fighter jets flying a combat air patrol over the area and additional fighter jets on standing alert at their bases every time PLO representatives were meeting. On 10 November 1988, Algerian early warning radars detected a formation of suspicious radar contacts approaching from the east at a medium level. Two more fighter jets were scrambled to reinforce the combat air patrol over the Club des Pins, which was ordered to turn and take a position in front of the incoming aircraft. Additional Algerian radars began tracking the incoming aircraft, as did Tunisian radars. The contacts were identified as two formations of aircraft coming in at high speed. The incoming aircraft eventually turned back.

While the two incoming formations were never spotted or identified by other means, it was presumed that they were Israeli aircraft en route to bomb the Club des Pins. According to a Tunisian Air Force officer who had been serving at the time, the Israelis likely turned back because they detected the electromagnetic activity of the Algerian and Tunisian radars and wanted to complete the mission without suffering any losses.

== Diplomatic context ==
At the time of the attack, Tunisia had a close relationship with the U.S. and was considered an ally against neighbouring Libya. Following the expulsion of the PLO from Lebanon in 1982, it was the U.S. who asked Tunisia to receive the exiled fighters and allow the PLO into Tunis. President Bourguiba had been less radical than some other Arab states, in 1965 he had controversially proposed partition of what had been Palestine, a two-state solution.

On 11 February 1985, King Hussein and Yasir Arafat had come to a significant agreement on how to proceed with negotiations on a peace agreement with Israel. This was followed by Britain's Prime Minister Thatcher, on a visit to Jordan in early September, announcing the invitation of a Jordanian delegation including two members of the PLO for talks with the British Foreign Secretary, Geoffrey Howe. On 27 September, King Hussein announced in a speech to the United Nations that Jordan was willing to start direct negotiations with Israel. The speech was well received and referred to the 'sons of Abraham'. Prior to the King's arrival in New York, the US administration had announced it was submitting to Congress the purposed sale of weapons to Jordan worth $1.5 billion. The 3-year package included advanced fighter aircraft and air defence systems. On the day before the attack, King Hussein had a meeting with President Reagan at which he repeated his commitment to a peaceful settlement. He also emphasised that the PLO was an essential partner.

Afterwards, King Hussein is quoted as saying "the raid is a stake in the heart of peace." The 7 October hijacking of the Achille Lauro and subsequent events led to a further cooling of relations between the West and the PLO.

There was much surprise when the U.S. abstained from a UN Security Council motion condemning Israel. The motion put forward by Tunisia was passed unanimously 14–0, though the call for sanctions and the description of Israel as a "terrorist state" had been dropped. It was the first time that the U.S. had not used its veto since 1982.

It was widely assumed in the Arab world that the target had been Yasir Arafat, and that the U.S. had colluded, at least passively. The UK listening post on Mount Olympus, Cyprus, and the US 6th Fleet based around Crete would have detected the aircraft as soon as they were in the air. A Los Angeles Times report said that the US Navy had the opportunity to alert Tunisia but decided not to. It would have given over an hour's warning.

== See also ==
- Operation Gift
- Operation Opera
- Operation Outside the Box

== Sources ==
- Seale, Patrick. Abu Nidal: A gun for hire. Arrow, 1993. ISBN 0-09-922571-9.
