= Camberford Underwriting =

Financial advisor and underwriting agency

Camberford Underwriting (formerly Camberford Law) is an independent financial adviser and underwriting agency. It was established in 1958 and is based in Bromley, London. Camberford has developed niche insurance expertise in the private security and cleaning industry sectors. It is a Lloyd's-listed broker.

In April 2008, a management buyout of Camberford Law was announced.
