= Tunisian Air Force =

Air warfare branch of Tunisia's military

- جيش الطيران (Arabic); Armée de l'Air (French)
- Badge of the Tunisian Air Force
- Founded: 1959; 67 years ago
- Country: Tunisia
- Type: Air force
- Role: Aerial warfare
- Size: 4,500 personnel
- Part of: Tunisian Armed Forces
- Headquarters: Bizerte
- Anniversaries: 24 July
- Equipment: 155 aircraft
- Engagements: War on terror

Commanders
- Commander-in-Chief: President Kais Saied
- Commander of the Air Force: General Mohamed El Hajjam

Insignia
- Roundel

Aircraft flown
- Attack: Northrop F-5
- Fighter: Northrop F-5
- Helicopter: Bell 412, Bell 204/205, Bell UH-1N Iroquois, Bell OH-58, Aérospatiale Alouette II, Aérospatiale Alouette III, Sikorsky UH-60 Black Hawk, Sikorsky S-61R, Eurocopter AS350 Écureuil
- Patrol: Cessna 208, Maule M-7
- Trainer: Northrop F-5F, Beechcraft T-6 Texan II, Aero L-59 Super Albatros
- Transport: Let L-410 Turbolet, Lockheed C-130B/H/J-30 Hercules/Super Hercules

The Tunisian Air Force (Arabic: جيش الطيران, French: Armée de l'Air) is one of the branches of the Tunisian Armed Forces.

== History ==
The Tunisian Air Force was established in 1959, three years after Tunisia regained its independence from France. It took deliveries of its first aircraft, eight Saab 91 Safirs, in 1960, later to be complemented by further Saab 91 Safirs. The Tunisian Air Force entered the jet age in 1965 with the purchase of 8 MB326-Bs and then 5 MB326-LTs. In 1969, the country received 15 ex-USAF F-86F Sabres. Between 1974 and 1978 12 SF.260 Warriors and 9 SF.260Cs were delivered for basic training. In 1977–78, eight MB.326KTs were supplied for light attack duties. In 1981, Tunisia ordered 12 F-5s (8 F-5E and 4 F-5F); deliveries took place in 1984–85. Tunisia added 5 ex-USAF F-5Es from the Alconbury Aggressor Squadron in 1989. In 1985 Tunisia ordered two C130-H Herculeses. In 1995, a major Czech order was placed, with 12 Aero L-59 armed trainers and 3 Let L-410UVP transports ordered. In 1997, five surplus C-130B's were delivered from the USA. Tunisia had two C-130J-30s on order for delivery in 2013 and 2014. Tunisia purchased a 8 UH-60M.

Tunisia's four main bases are Bizerte/Sidi Ahmed, Gafsa, Bizerte/La Karouba, and Sfax.

== Organization ==
The order of battle of the Tunisian Air force is as below:

=== Tunis-Laouina ===
No. 12 Squadron
Transport squadron, Let L-410 Turbolet

=== Bizerte-Sidi Ahmed ===
No. 15 Squadron
Fighter squadron, Northrop F-5 Tiger
No. 21 Squadron
Transport squadron, C-130 Hercules

=== Bizerte-La Karouba ===
No. 31 Squadron
Helicopter squadron, Bell 205, UH-1 Iroquois
No. 32 Squadron
Helicopter squadron, Alouette II, Ecureuil
No. 33 Squadron
Helicopter squadron
No. 36 Squadron
Helicopter squadron

=== Sfax-Thyna ===
No. 31 Squadron
Helicopter squadron

=== Gafsa ===
No. 34 Squadron
Helicopter squadron, OH-58D
No. 51 Squadron
UAV squadron,MQ-27
No. 42 Squadron
Light Transport ISR squadron Cessna 208ex

== Aircraft ==
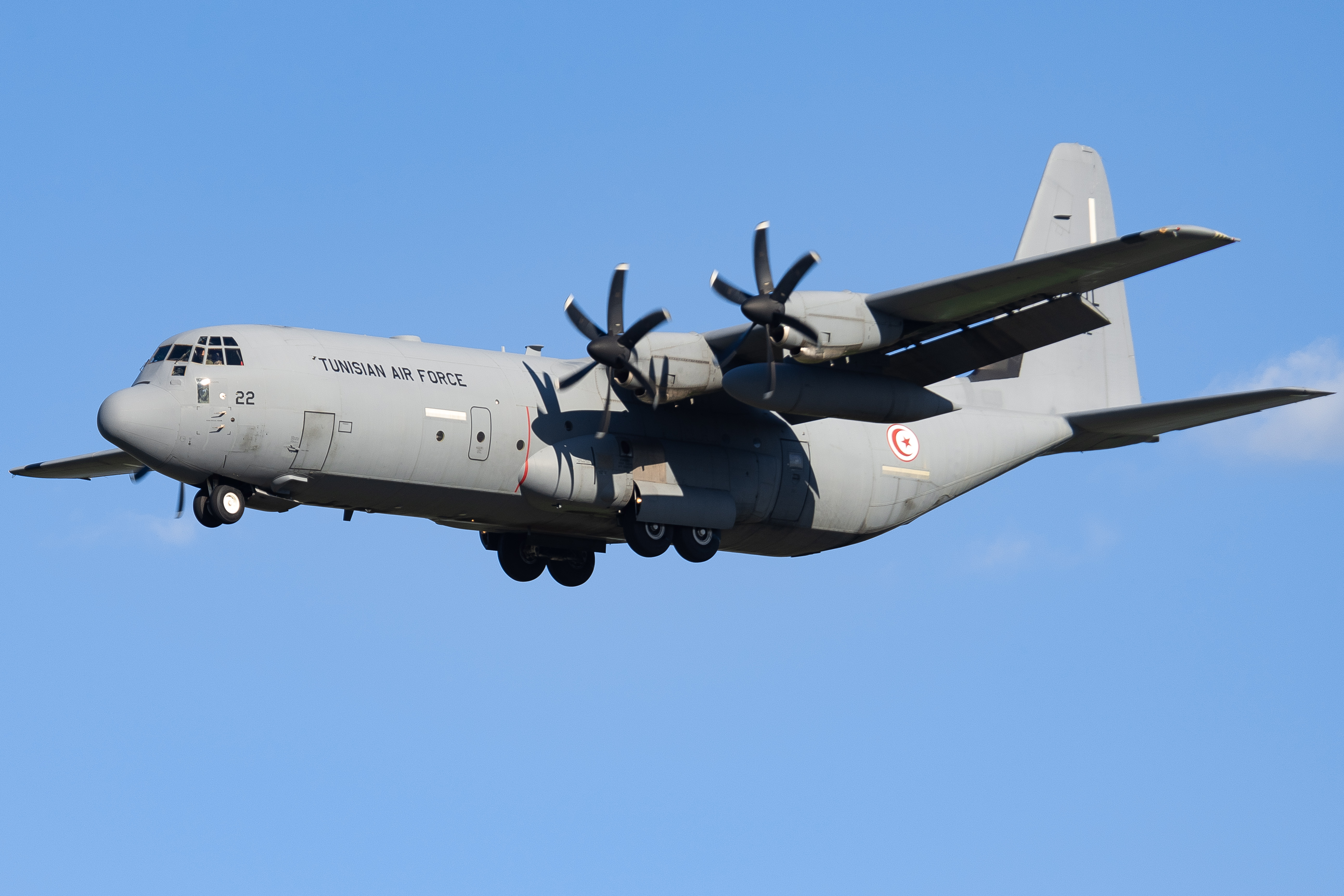
A C-130J approaching on to Beijing Capital International Airport

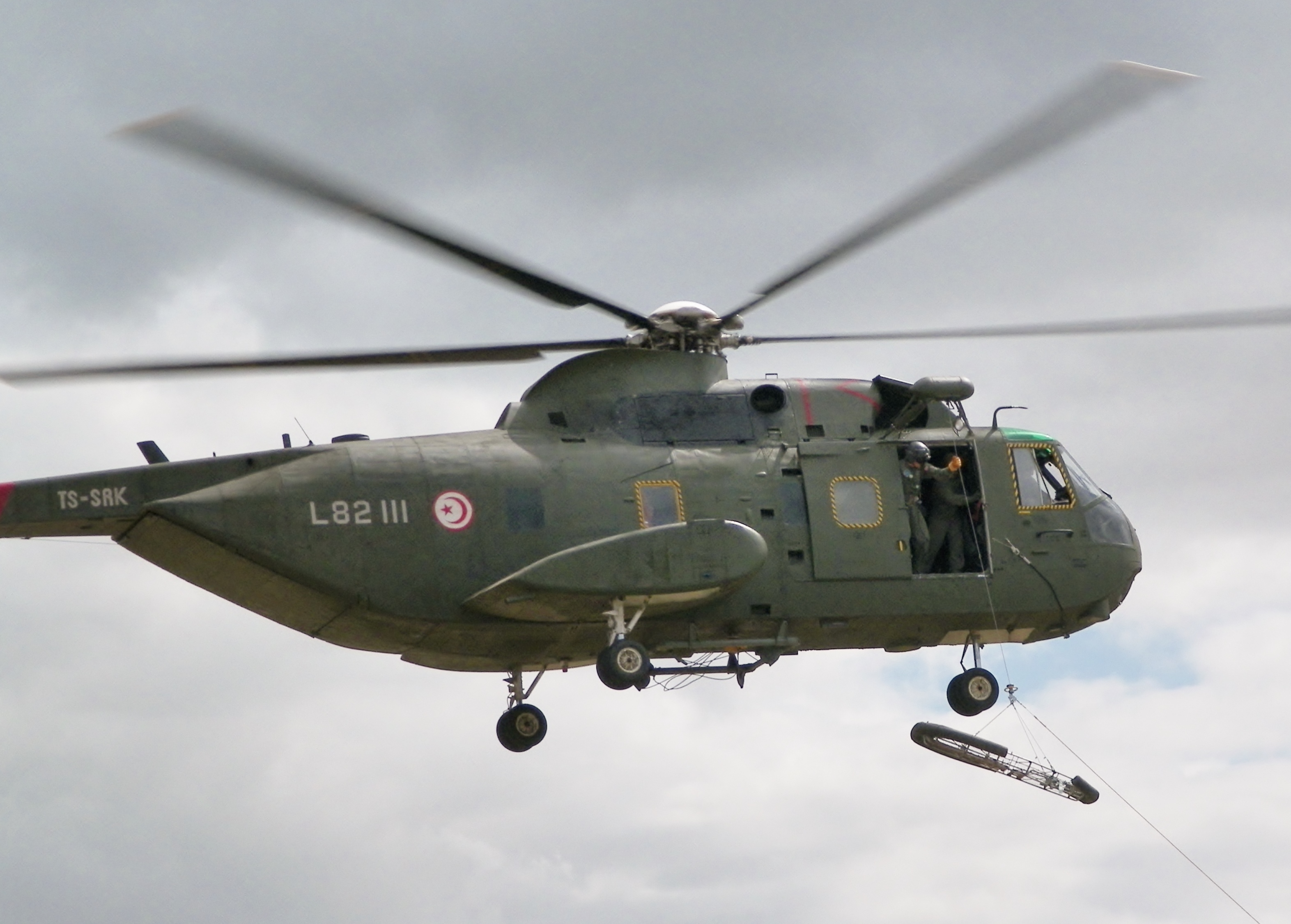
A Tunisian HH-3 helicopter participating in a rescue exercise in Bizerte

=== Current inventory ===
Aircraft	Origin	Type	Variant	In service	Notes
Combat aircraft
Northrop F-5	United States	Light fighter	F-5E	10	
Beechcraft T-6 Texan II	United States	Light attack aircraft	AT-6		4 on order.
Reconnaissance
Maule MX-7	United States	ISR	MX-7	12	For border surveillance
Cessna 208	United States	ISTAR		4	
Transport
Let L-410	Czech Republic	Utility		5	
C-130 Hercules	United States	Transport / SAR	C-130B/H	4	4 units were delivered between 2021 and January 2026
C-130J Super Hercules	United States	Tactical airlifter		2	
Helicopters
Bell 412	United States	Utility		2	
Bell 412 EPX	United States	Utility	Bell 412 EPX	(12 on order)	During Paris 2025 air show Tunisia has signed a deal with Bell to acquire 12 Bell 412 EPX
Bell 205	United States	Utility		21	
UH-1N Iroquois	United States	Utility		16	
Aérospatiale Gazelle	France	Armed scout		15	Armed with HOT MBDA missiles, seen in use during African Lion 2025
Bell OH-58	United States	Armed scout	OH-58D	18	Ex US army
Alouette II	France	Liaison / Light utility		8	
Alouette III	France	Liaison / Utility		7	
Sikorsky HH-3	United States	SAR / Transport		15	
Sikorsky UH-60	United States	Utility	UH-60M	8	
Eurocopter AS350	France	Utility / Liaison		6	
Trainer aircraft
Northrop F-5	United States	Conversion trainer	F-5F	3	
Aero L-59	Czechoslovakia	Jet trainer	L-59T	6-9	
SF.260	Italy	Trainer		17	
Textron T-6 Texan II	United States	Trainer	T-6C	8	4 on order.
UAV
TAI Anka	Turkey	ISTAR / UCAV	Anka S	6	

== Sources ==
- World Aircraft Information Files. Brightstar Publishing, London. File 337 Sheet 03
