= Aeralis Advanced Jet Trainer =

Family of British trainer aircraft by AERALIS

- A render of the advanced jet trainer variant

General information
- Type: Advanced trainer aircraft
- National origin: United Kingdom
- Manufacturer: Aeralis
- Status: Indefinitely stalled

The Aeralis Advanced Jet Trainer (AJT) is an advanced jet trainer aircraft design by Aeralis in the United Kingdom. It is the initial variant of a family of modular aircraft which are reconfigurable to cover a variety of roles, including operational training, basic jet training, aerobatics/display and light combat.

Work on the AJT began during the early 2010s; the project was publicly announced in June 2015 under the initial name of Dart. Funding was sought from various sources, both within Britain and internationally. In February 2021, the Rapid Capabilities Office of the Royal Air Force (RAF) awarded a three-year contract for the further development of the aircraft. The service was reviewing the aircraft for various purposes, including the Future Combat Air System (FCAS) initiative and as a potential replacement for its ageing BAE Systems Hawk aircraft. Aeralis had partnered with various organisations to develop the AJT, including the engineering consultancy company Atkins, the multinational propulsion specialist International Turbine Engine Company (ITEC), and the German conglomerate Siemens.

During October 2022, wind tunnel testing was performed by Airbus UK. Aeralis planned to carry out a first flight of the advanced jet trainer variant in 2024, but as of February 2025 this had not taken place.

In May 2026, it was reported that Aeralis had been placed under administration, citing a lack of funding due to sustained delays in the UK Defence Investment Plan, as well as the withdrawal of its principal financial backer of Barzan Holdings, citing the need to redirect Qatari funding towards air defence as a result of the Iran–United States war.

== Development ==
The Advanced Jet Trainer (AJT) project originated in the work of Tristan Crawford during the early 2010s. Crawford sought to develop a capable new trainer aircraft that would be suited to a range of different roles via the use of modular sections. Aeralis claims that the modular approach would achieve a 30 percent reduction in both acquisition and maintenance costs in comparison to traditional flight training counterparts. Early market research was collected from Royal Air Force (RAF) pilots, Fielding Aerospace Consultants, and the British government via UK Trade & Investment; additional expertise was intentionally sought outside of the conventional players in the British aerospace sector, such as Formula One suppliers.

During June 2015, the existence of the project was revealed to the public, at which point it was referred to as the Dart Jet. In 2018, Aeralis sought £1 million ($1.32 million) via crowdfunding to fund the design of a concept fuselage demonstrator to be presented at trade shows. During September 2019, it was announced that Aeralis had partnered with engineering and design consultancy firm Atkins to work on two out of three planned variants of the aircraft: the advanced jet trainer and the basic jet trainer.

During February 2021, Aeralis was awarded a three-year contract with the RAF's Rapid Capabilities Office for the further development of the aircraft. Additional external funding was also actively being sought to accelerate the programme; according to a spokesperson, the company aimed to reach the preproduction stage prior to the middle of the decade. In March 2021, the company signed a teaming agreement with Thales UK for the latter to support development of training and simulation systems.

In September 2021, Aeralis showcased a number of potential future variants of the type, including an uncrewed combat model and an uncrewed refuelling aircraft. The company also announced that it had received a £10.5 million cash injection from an unnamed Middle Eastern nation, later revealed to be the Qatar-based Barzan Holdings, which it stated was an indication that the AJT was gaining international interest. During that same month, Aeralis also signed a Memorandum of Understanding (MoU) with Rolls-Royce to supply engines for the aircraft; under this agreement, the preproduction aircraft will be powered by Rolls-Royce powerplants. Atkins and Siemens also agreed to collaborate with Aeralis on Aerside, the aircraft's digital system. Also in September 2021, Aeralis stated that it was scheduled to perform the first flight of the AJT some time during 2024.

During March 2022, a pair of full-scale mock-ups of the aircraft were presented at the DIMDEX conference in Qatar; these mock-ups were unveiled by the Emir of Qatar, Sheikh Tamim bin Hamad Al Thani, in a ceremony attended by representatives of Barzan Holdings and senior figures of the British and Qatari governments; international delegations from India, South Korea and Indonesia were also in attendance. Two months later, Aeralis received another significant investment from the RAF, initiating Phase 2 of the programme which evaluated the potential of PYRAMID, the UK Ministry of Defence's (MOD) open mission architecture. Aeralis also engaged with the MOD and its procurement arm, Defence Equipment and Support (DE&S) to explore the potential of Aeralis within the framework of the RAF's Future Combat Air System (FCAS) initiative. During July 2022, the company signed a MoU with Ascent Flight Training to develop a future flying training system and explore collaboration opportunities in the provision of military flying training.

During October 2022, wind tunnel testing of a scale model of the AJT was performed by Airbus UK at Filton. Two months later, Aeralis was awarded a £9 million (US$11 million) contract from the MOD to provide digital engineering services. During June 2023, Aeralis signed a MoU with International Turbine Engine Company (ITEC), a joint venture between Honeywell and Aerospace Industrial Development Corporation (AIDC), to develop powerplant solutions for the AJT; the agreement also covers collaboration on the design of electrical and thermal management systems.

== Design ==
The Aeralis Advanced Jet Trainer (AJT) is the initial variant of a family of light jet aircraft which share approximately 85% of their components, including avionics, digital systems and core fuselage. The rest of the aircraft, including engine pods, wings and tail, can be interchanged to fulfil different roles. According to Aeralis, this system of modularity and fleet rationalisation is intended to deliver lower costs and increased flexibility to its end-user. The roles deliverable by the Aeralis system include advanced jet trainer, basic jet trainer, operational trainer, aerobatics/display and light combat. In a basic trainer configuration, it is to be fitted with straight wings and straight tailplanes, possess a maximum take-off weight (MTOW) of around 7,700 pounds, and be capable of a maximum speed of 350 knots; in an advanced configuration, the aircraft is fitted with swept wing and tailplanes, an MTOW of roughly 11,000 pounds and a top speed of Mach 0.90.

It is intended that a range of powerplants be available for the AJT, delivering different thrust outputs and other performance criteria to suit the diverse mission roles of the operator. Aeralis has formed agreements with multiple engine manufacturers, such as Rolls-Royce and the International Turbine Engine Company (ITEC), to provide propulsion and other systems for the AJT.

== Administration ==
On 16 May 2026, Aeralis was placed under administration, appointing David Buchler and Joanne Milner as administrators. Thirty workers were reported to have lost their jobs as a result. The company cited continued delays in the UK Defence Investment Plan in placing the company under severe pressure. The BBC reported that Barzan Holdings, the investment arm of the Qatari Ministry of Defence, and the company's primary investor had pulled its funding as a result of the Iran–United States war, citing the need to redirect investments in air defence equipment. Barzan Holdings had previously raised its stake in the firm to nearly twenty-five percent. Attempts to produce aircraft for other foreign partners such as France had also failed to come to fruition.

== Potential alternatives ==
A number of other alternatives have been suggested for the UK's fast jet trainer programme following the collapse of Aeralis. One contender is Boeing T-7 Red Hawk, produced by an industrial partnership of Boeing, Saab and BAE Systems. Leonardo is offering its M-346 as a contender. Other options discussed in the press include Korea Aerospace Industries with its KAI T-50 Golden Eagle and Turkish Aerospace with the TAI Hürjet.
