= AIDC =

AIDC may refer to:

== Aerospace ==
- Aerospace Industrial Development Corporation, Taiwanese aerospace company
  - AIDC AT-3, military trainer aircraft manufactured 1984–1990
  - AIDC F-CK-1 Ching-kuo, fighter aircraft introduced in 1994
  - AIDC PL-1B, two-seat trainer aircraft introduced in 1962
  - AIDC T-CH-1, trainer aircraft introduced in 1973
  - AIDC UH-1H, utility helicopter manufactured 1956–1987
  - AIDC XC-2, civil transport aircraft introduced in 1978

== Industrial development ==
- Arkansas Industrial Development Commission, first run by Winthrop Rockefeller in 1955
- Australian Industry Development Corporation (1970-2010), and its subsidiary AIDC Ltd, Australian government statutory body

== Other ==
- Australian International Documentary Conference, a conference for the promotion of documentary, factual and unscripted screen content
  - AIDC Awards, awards given for documentary films and TV programs
- Automatic identification and data capture, methods of identifying objects, collecting data about them, and entering them directly into computer systems, without human involvement
