= XC2 =

XC2 or XC-2 may refer to:

- 2011 XC2, a near-Earth asteroid
- AIDC XC-2, Taiwanese prototype civil transport aircraft
- Kantega XC2, German single and two-place paragliders
- Kawasaki XC-2, Japanese military transport aircraft
- Summit XC2, German single-place paraglider
- Trango XC2, German single-place paraglider
- Xenoblade Chronicles 2, a 2017 action role-playing game for the Nintendo Switch console
