= Boeing–Saab T-7 Red Hawk =

US-Swedish advanced pilot training aircraft

T-7 Red Hawk
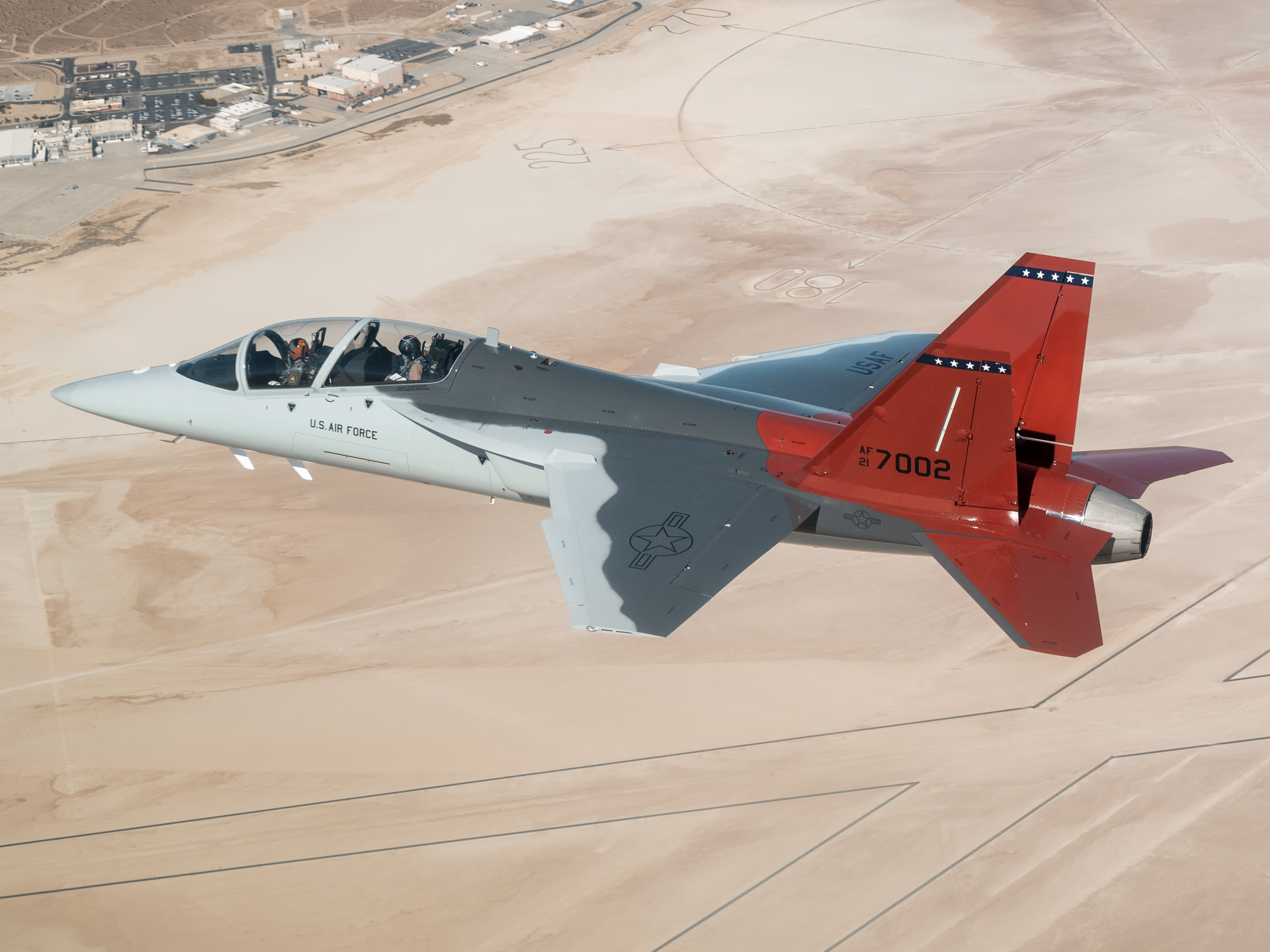
- T-7A Red Hawk over Edwards Air Force Base in 2023

General information
- Type: Advanced trainer
- National origin: United States/Sweden
- Manufacturer: Boeing / Saab
- Primary user: United States Air Force
- Number built: 2 prototypes, and 3 engineering and manufacturing development aircraft

History
- Manufactured: 2021–present
- First flight: 20 December 2016

The Boeing–Saab T-7 Red Hawk, initially known as the Boeing T-X (later Boeing–Saab T-X), is an American-Swedish transonic advanced jet trainer produced by Boeing with Saab. In September 2018, the United States Air Force (USAF) selected it for the T-X program to replace the Northrop T-38 Talon as the service's advanced jet trainer.

== Development ==
The USAF's Air Education and Training Command (AETC) began developing the requirements for a replacement for the supersonic Northrop T-38 Talon as early as 2003. Originally, the replacement trainer was expected to enter service around 2020. A fatigue failure of a T-38C killed its two-person crew in 2008, and the USAF advanced the target date of initial operational capability (IOC) to 2017.

In the fiscal 2013 budget proposal, the USAF suggested delaying the initial operating capability to FY2020 with the contract award not expected before FY2016. Shrinking budgets and higher-priority modernization projects pushed the IOC of the T-X program winner to "fiscal year 2023 or 2024". Although the program was left out of the FY 2014 budget entirely, the service still viewed the trainer as a priority.

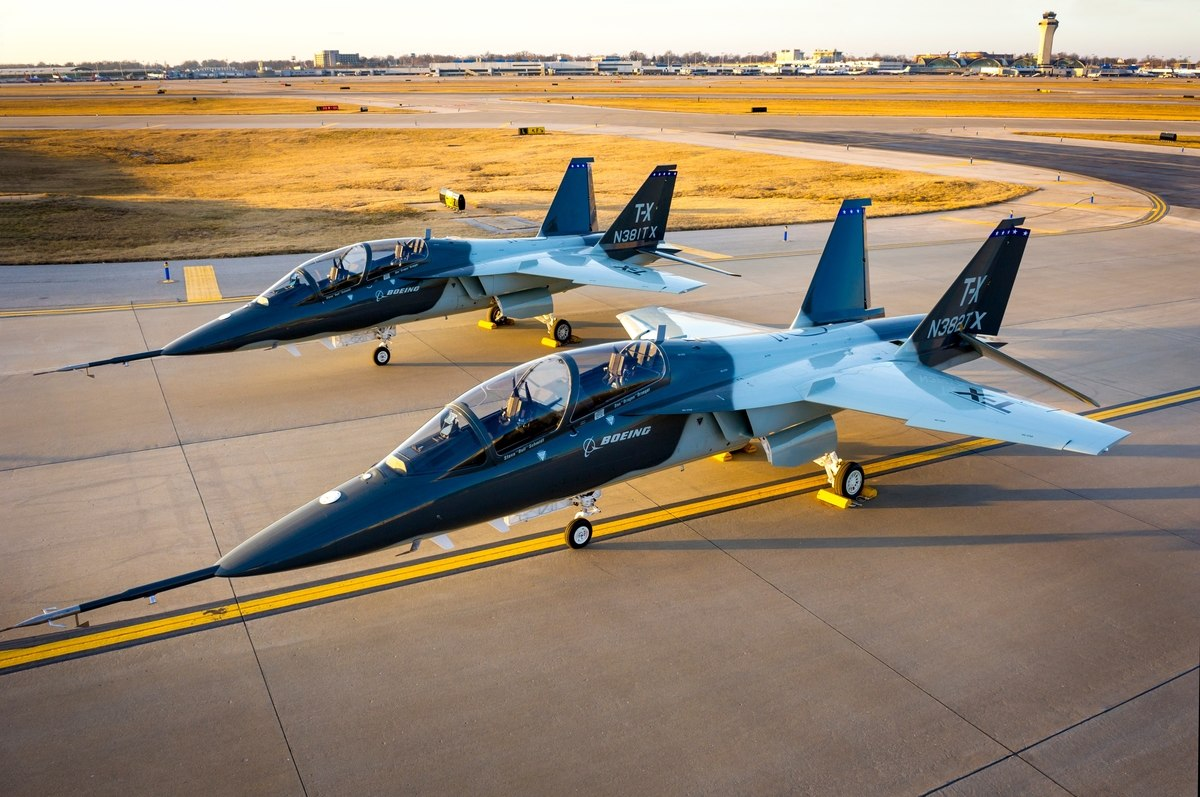
Boeing-Saab T-7 prototypes c. 2018

Boeing teamed up with Swedish aerospace firm Saab to compete for the T-7 program. On 13 September 2016, the team unveiled prototypes of the Boeing T-X, a single-engine advanced jet trainer with a twin tail, tandem seating, and retractable tricycle landing gear, powered with a General Electric F404 afterburning turbofan engine. The first T-X aircraft flew on 20 December 2016. The Boeing–Saab team submitted their entry after the Air Force opened the T-7 program to bids in December 2016.

In September 2018, Air Force officials announced that Boeing's design would be its new advanced jet trainer, under a program costing up to US$9.2 billion (~$11.6 billion in 2025) that would purchase 351 aircraft, 46 simulators, maintenance training and support. This contract has options for up to 475 airplanes in total. In 2018, Boeing recorded a $691-million (~$871 million in 2025) pre-tax charge during the third quarter, in part because of the T-X program.

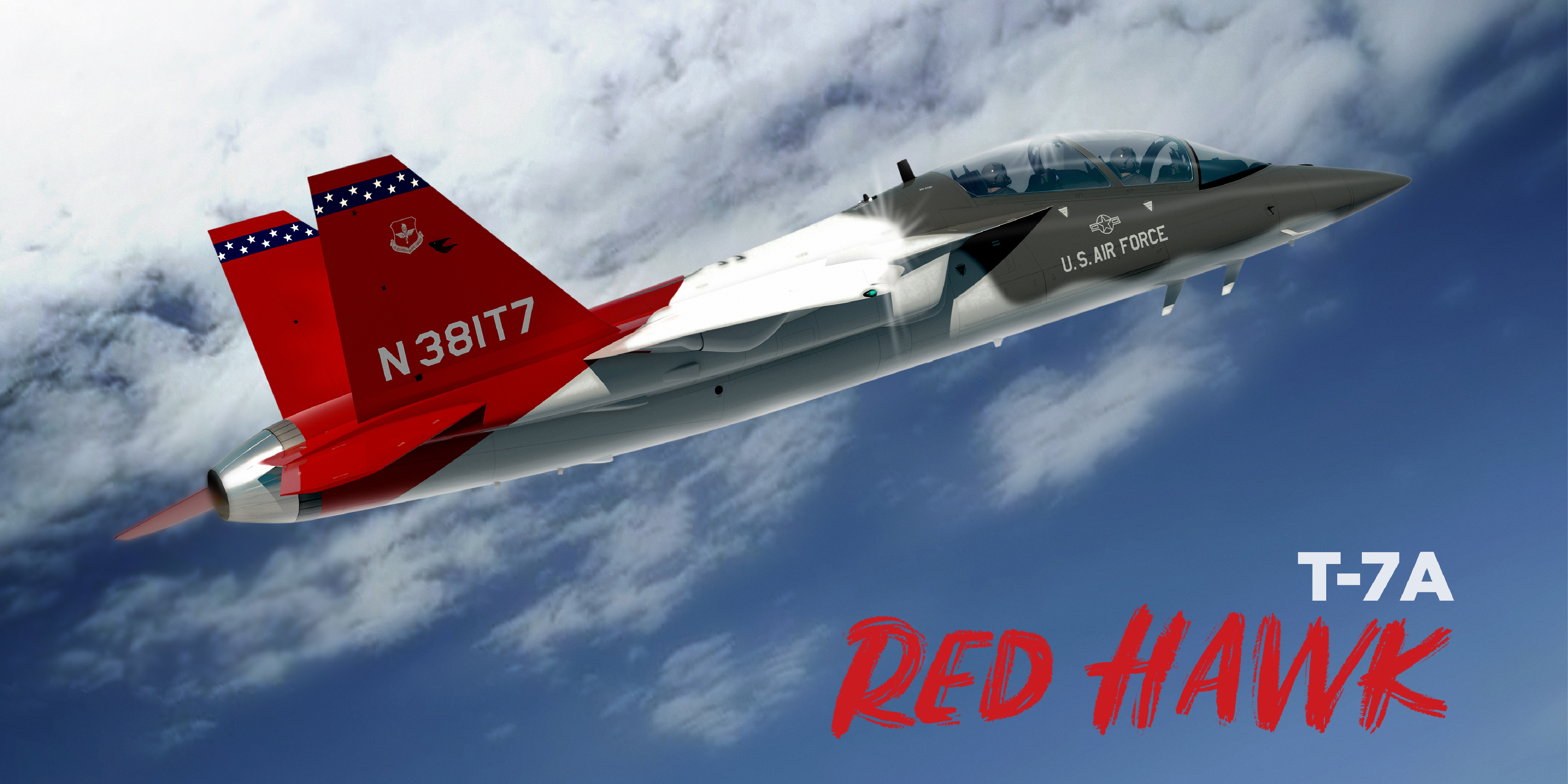
A U.S. Air Force publicity image of the T-7A Red Hawk showing Red Tail livery

In May 2019, Saab announced that it would open a U.S. manufacturing facility for the T-X in Indiana in the Purdue University-affiliated Discovery Park District in West Lafayette, Indiana.

In September 2019, the USAF named the aircraft the "T-7A Red Hawk" as a tribute to the Tuskegee Airmen, who painted their airplanes' tails bright red, and to the Curtiss P-40 Warhawk, the first aircraft flown in combat by the 99th Fighter Squadron, the U.S. Army Air Force's first black fighter squadron.

The aircraft entered the Engineering and Manufacturing Development (EMD) phase in February 2021. In April 2021, Saab Group delivered one aft section of T-7A aircraft to the Boeing St. Louis plant. In July 2021, Saab had delivered the second aft section to the Boeing St. Louis plant. Boeing spliced Saab's aft section with the front section, fins, wings and tail assembly to become a complete test aircraft for use in the EMD's flight test program. As of 2021, the plan was that on completion of the EMD phase, Saab's new facility in West Lafayette, Indiana, was to serve as the manufacturing hub for the T-7A Red Hawk's aft section and sub-systems such as hydraulics, fuel systems and secondary power.

Saab has developed new software for the T-7 to help provide for cheaper and faster development. The T-7A employed digital engineering that went from development to the first test flight within 36 months. The T-7A has an advanced and digitized production line that takes only 30 minutes to splice the aft section with the wings. The digital build process allows technicians to build the aircraft with minimal tooling and drilling during the assembly process. The first T-7A was rolled out on 28 April 2022.

In May 2023, the Government Accountability Office released a report on the T-7 program detailing problems with the software and safety systems and other delays that saw the USAF delay the next production decision to February 2025. The report said that a schedule provided by Boeing in January 2023 was optimistic and dependent on favorable assumptions. Notwithstanding the delayed production decision, the report noted that Boeing still planned to start producing the first T-7s in early 2024.

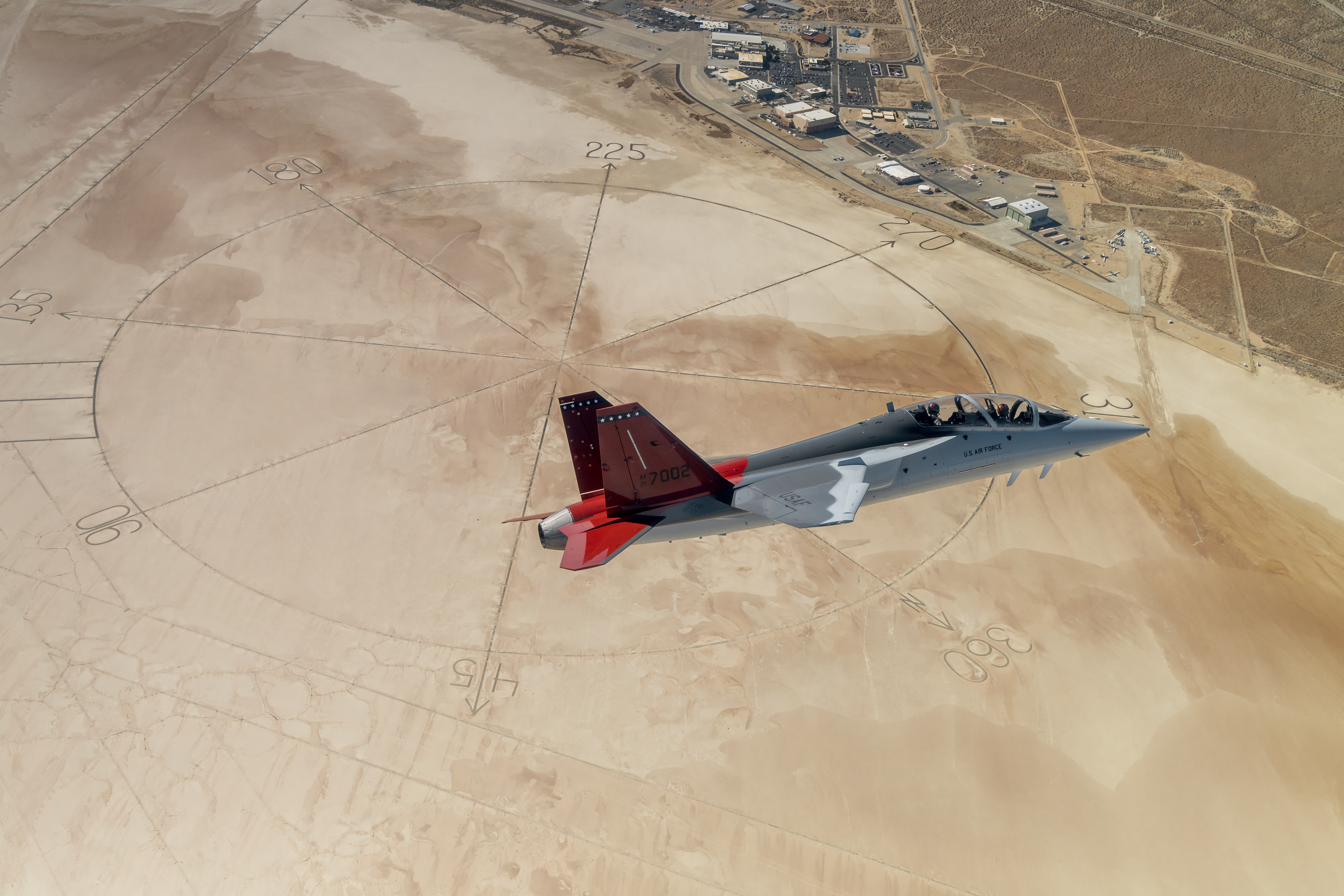
The first T-7A Red Hawk flies over Edwards Air Force Base in November 2023

In June 2023, the first flight of the T-7A aircraft was conducted from St. Louis Lambert International Airport, by Major Bryce Turner, a test pilot with the 416th Flight Test Squadron at Edwards Air Force Base, California, and Steve Schmidt, Boeing's chief T-7 test pilot.

On 21 September 2023, the first Red Hawk (tail number APT-2) was shipped to the US Air Force. It was deployed at Edwards Air Force Base for testing. Two additional units (APT-1 and APT-3) were delivered late 2023, with a fourth (APT-4) delayed into 2024. In total, five Red Hawks in engineering and manufacturing development configuration will be delivered for its test program. As of February 2026, Boeing is expected to deliver the first production examples in 2026.

In May 2026, the US Air Force announced that it had approved the T-7 to move into initial low-rate production, with the Air Force expecting to reach initial operating capability in 2027, by which time a decision would be made on ramping up production to full capacity.

However, a Government Accountability Office report in July 2026 disclosed that further multiple delays would push back the full-rate production decision on the T-7A Red Hawk two years from 2027 to 2029. The report cited "significant delays in the completion of developmental testing", largely caused by the need to complete additional engineering analysis.

== Design ==
The T-7's design allows for future missions to be added, such as the aggressor and light attack/fighter roles. In the training environment, it has been specifically designed for high-G and high-angle-of-attack maneuvers and night operations, with an emphasis on being easily maintained. The aircraft is equipped with a single GE F404 turbofan engine, but produces three times the total thrust of the T-38 twinjet.

Press reports indicate that Saab produces the aft fuselage sections of the aircraft, with Qarbon Technologies responsible for the wing sections.

== Operational history ==
On 5 December 2025, T-7, serial number 21-7005 was delivered to the 12th Flying Training Wing at Joint Base San Antonio-Randolph, which operates the T-38s, T-6s, and T-1s. The wing officially took delivery of the jet during a delivery ceremony on 9 January 2026. In May 2026, leaders from the 99th Flying Training Squadron became the first Air Education and Training Command pilots qualified to fly the T-7.

=== Potential operators ===
Boeing aims to sell over 2,700 Red Hawks globally. In addition to the USAF, the company is also targeting Serbia as a possible replacement for its G-4s and J-22 trainer aircraft and Australia to replace 33 BAE Hawk Mk 127 Lead-in Fighter (LIF) jet trainers through the Royal Australian Air Force LIFT program.

The T-7B variant is one of the contenders for the United States Navy's Tactical Surrogate Aircraft program, with a possible sale of 64 aircraft. A navalised version was also a contender for the USN's Undergraduate Jet Training System program, with a minimum order of 145 aircraft to replace existing T-45 Goshawks. Boeing withdrew from the program in June 2026.

The F/T-7X, a variant of the T-7, is one of the contenders for the USAF's Advanced Tactical Trainer program, with possible sales of 100 to 400 aircraft.

By November 2023, the USAF was actively considering the possibility of turning the T-7 into an armed combat aircraft. Conceptually dubbed the F-7, such a jet could provide roughly the same capability as a fourth-generation fighter which could maintain force numbers as F-16s are retired. Boeing intends to offer an armed version of the T-7 to replace aging Northrop F-5 and Dassault/Dornier Alpha Jet fleets around the world.

==== Brazil ====
Boeing has pitched the T-7 to the Brazilian Air Force.

==== Japan ====
The T-7 is also a contender to replace the Japanese Air Self-Defense Force's Kawasaki T-4, competing against the Alenia Aermacchi M-346 Master Block 20 and the Mitsubishi Heavy Industries T-X. A potential licensed variant of the T-7 for the JASDF has been dubbed the T-7AJ.

==== United Kingdom ====
The UK Fast Jet Trainer program intends to replace the ageing BAE Systems Hawk as it is nearly obsolete. A number of alternatives have been suggested, including the T-7, with BAE Systems expected to join the industrial partnership of Boeing and Saab to ensure there is significant UK content in production aircraft. Leonardo is offering its M-346 as a contender, and other options discussed in the press include Korea Aerospace Industries with its KAI T-50 Golden Eagle and Turkish Aerospace with the TAI Hürjet.

== Variants ==
BTX-1
Two prototypes were constructed for evaluation:
- N381TX, the first prototype built and first T-7 to fly
- N382TX, the second prototype used in testing
T-7A Red Hawk
Production aircraft for the USAF as the winner of the T-X program to replace the Northrop T-38 Talon. Designated eT-7A prior to delivery, identifying it as a digitally engineered aircraft.
T-7A Block 10
A variant proposed to the USAF with various avionics and safety upgrades.
T-7B
Variant proposed for the U.S. Navy's Tactical Surrogate Aircraft (TSA) program, with a possible sale of 64 aircraft.
T-7 UJTS
Proposed advanced jet trainer for the United States Navy Undergraduate Jet Training System (UJTS) competition to replace the Boeing T-45 Goshawk with a possible sale of 145 aircraft. The aircraft would not be carrier-capable.
T-7AJ
Proposed designation for a domestically produced variant of T-7 for the Japanese Air Self-Defense Force to replace the Kawasaki T-4 with a possible sale of 200 aircraft.
T-7 FJT
Proposed designation for the Royal Air Force Fast Jet Trainer (FJT) competition to replace the BAE Systems Hawk with a possible sale of 60 aircraft.
F/T-7X
Variant proposed for the USAF's Advanced Tactical Trainer program, with a possible 100 to 400 aircraft sale.
F-7
Light combat aircraft variant proposed for the USAF.

== Operators ==
United States

- United States Air Force
  - 412th Test Wing
    - 416th Flight Test Squadron
  - 12th Flying Training Wing

== Specifications (T-7A) ==
Data from FlightGlobal, Air & Space Forces Magazine, Boeing and Key.Aero

General characteristics

- Crew: 2: pilot and instructor/passenger
- Length: 46 ft 11 in (14.30 m)
- Wingspan: 30 ft 7 in (9.32 m)
- Height: 13 ft 6 in (4.11 m)
- Empty weight: 18,000 lb (8,165 kg)
- Gross weight: 22,000 lb (9,979 kg)
- Fuel capacity: 4,500 pounds (2,000 kg)
- Powerplant: 1 × General Electric F404-GE-103 afterburning turbofan, 11,000 lbf (49 kN) thrust dry, 17,200 lbf (77 kN) with afterburner

Performance

- Maximum speed: Mach 0.975
- Range: 990 nmi (1,140 mi, 1,830 km)
- Service ceiling: 50,000 ft (15,000 m)
- g limits: 8 g

== See also ==
Aircraft of comparable role, configuration, and era

- Aero L-39 Skyfox
- AIDC T-5 Brave Eagle
- Aeralis Advanced Jet Trainer
- Alenia Aermacchi M-346 Master
- Hongdu JL-10
- KAI T-50 Golden Eagle
- TAI Hürjet
- Yakovlev Yak-130
