= TAI Hürjet =

Turkish trainer and light combat aircraft

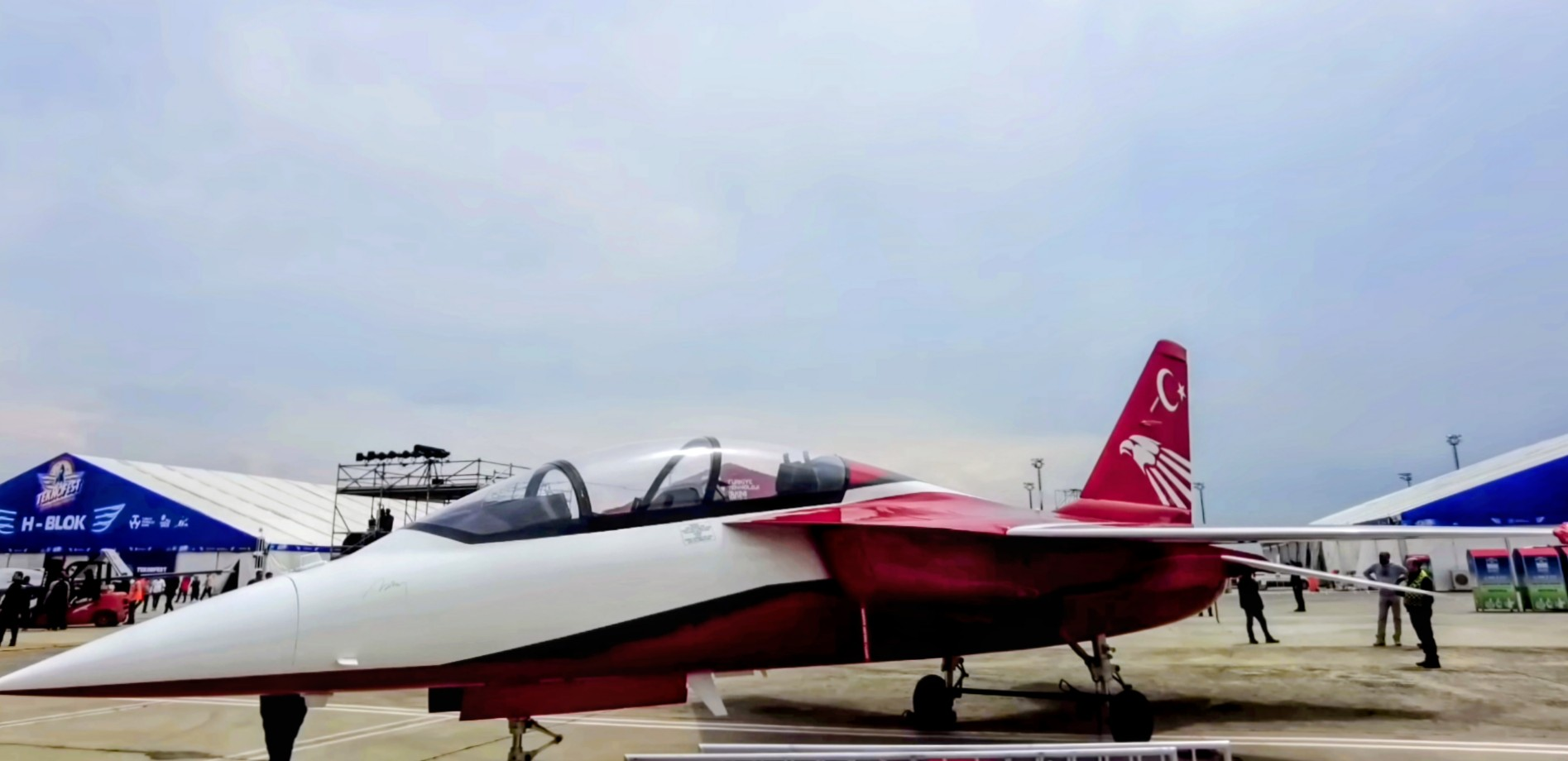
- TAI Hürjet

General information
- Type: Advanced jet trainer (lead-in fighter trainer) and Light combat aircraft
- National origin: Turkey
- Manufacturer: Turkish Aerospace Industries
- Status: Scheduled to enter operational service
- Prototypes: 3 prototypes
- Number built: 1

History
- Introduction date: 2026
- First flight: 25 April 2023

The TAI Hürjet is a single-engine, tandem seat, supersonic advanced jet trainer and light combat aircraft, under development by Turkish Aerospace Industries (TAI). The first prototype made its first flight on 25 April 2023. The aircraft's name, Hürjet, is the compound word of hür and jet, which means free and jet in Turkish, and also has meaning in honor of Turkish fighter pilot and aviation engineer Vecihi Hürkuş.

The Turkish Air Force intends to use the design to replace the Northrop T-38M Talon in the trainer role and also to supplement the General Dynamics F-16C Fighting Falcon for close air support. The aircraft is also planned to replace the Northrop F-5A/2000 Freedom Fighter used by the Turkish Stars aerobatic team. A naval version of the aircraft may also be developed. The company also plans to pursue export orders to countries looking to replace older trainer and ground attack aircraft.

== Development and design ==
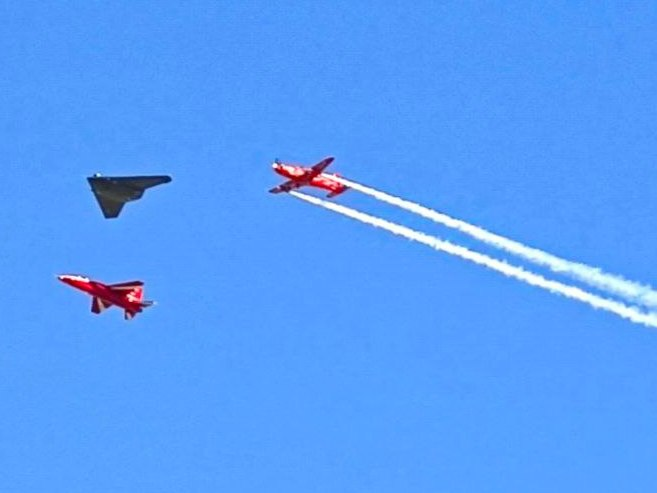
TAI Anka-3 (center) flying in formation with a TAI Hürjet (left) and a TAI Hürkuş (right) in 2024

The Hürjet project began in July 2017 as a TAI-funded private venture, with official approval from TAI's board on August 14, 2017. The goal was to create an indigenous supersonic jet trainer and light combat aircraft (LCA) to modernize the Turkish Air Force's training and operational capabilities.

Conceptual Design Phase (CDP) was completed in April 2018, defining the aircraft's basic requirements. A mock-up was displayed at the 2018 Farnborough International Airshow. On 22 July 2018, the Turkish Under-secretariat for Defence Industries announced that the Turkish Air Force had signed an agreement with TAI, giving the project official status to move development forward.

Preliminary Design Review (PDR) was scheduled for February 2019 but delayed; it focused on refining the design. Critical Design Review (CDR) was completed in March 2021, later than the planned August 2020, finalizing the aircraft's design.

As of January 2020 the aircraft did not have an engine selected, although the Eurojet EJ200 and the General Electric F404-GE-102 were under consideration at the time. Capabilities are planned to include air-to-air refuelling, fly-by-wire with parameter limiting, built in auxiliary power unit, night vision goggle-compatible cockpit, head-up display and an integrated helmet display system.

TAI completed the first test simulator for the aircraft in September 2020. Designated Hürjet 270, the artificial intelligence based simulator will incorporate feedback from the test pilots to change the flight control algorithms and the avionics software during the flight test process. The company has developed simulator avionics, flight control systems, screen, cockpit and communication systems for the simulator.

The flight control systems of the aircraft itself are manufactured by Moog Inc., who also manufacture actuators and flight control systems for other fast jet trainers including the Leonardo M-346.

Turkey has invited Malaysia to join the Hürjet project, in the role of producing some parts for the aircraft. While Malaysia has some experience developing composite materials, it has never designed nor built an aircraft.

On January 12, 2022, the Defense Industry Executive Committee convened and announced that the first stage mass production decision was taken for the Hürjet, which is scheduled to make its first flight in 2025.

On April 25, 2023, the maiden flight of the Hürjet was conducted from TAI's testing airfield in Ankara, by Hürjet's Chief Testing Pilot Ercan Çelik.

On September 3, 2023, the Hürjet prototype successfully conducted a formation flight with the Turkish Stars aerobatic team, completing a total of 17 flights, accumulating a total of 9 hours and 8 minutes of flight time.

In May 2024, the Hürjet prototype successfully conducted a formation flight with an ANKA-3 stealth UCAV prototype, completing a total of 66 flights.

On July 11, 2024, the Hürjet prototype successfully conducted a transonic flight test, reaching a speed of Mach 0.9 at an altitude of 30,000 feet, completing a total of 79 flights.

On July 22, 2024, TAI, GE Aerospace and TEI signed a Memorandum of Understanding on integrating the F404 engine into new Hürjet aircraft variants and performing assembly, inspection, and testing of the F404 engines in Turkey. TEI would also provide assembly, maintenance, repair, and overhaul for the engine for Hürjet aircraft and export customers. TEI also plans to perform production of the engines and provide integrated logistics support (ILS) for end-users.

On July 28, 2024, the first Hürjet, designated tail number #24-001 with Turkish Air Force insignia, successfully landed in Torrejón Air Base for evaluation by the Spanish Air and Space Force regarding Spain's tender to replace its F-5 aircraft fleet. The flight started in TAI facilities in Ankara (LTAE) with stops in Tekirdağ (TEQ), Belgrade (BEG), Brescia (VBS) and Mont-de-Marsan (LFBM) before arriving in Madrid (TOJ).

On August 16, 2024, the Hürjet prototype successfully conducted its 100th flight piloted by TAI test pilots Ercan Çelik and Orhan Boran, accumulating a total of 118 hours of flight time.

The Hürjet prototype is expected to be showcased to the Egyptian Air Force and other militaries from Africa and the Middle East with a demonstration flight at the Egypt International Airshow 2024.

On 12 November the second prototype of Hürjet successfully completed its first flight. The second Hürjet prototype (PT-2, TUS-A003), remained airborne for 26 minutes on its first flight, reaching a speed of 260 knots and an altitude of 10,000 feet, with an F-16D flying ‘chase’.

On 21 November the second prototype of Hürjet took off into the sky with its new paint.

On 26 February 2025, Turkish Air Force Commander General Ziya Cemal Kadıoğlu and Spanish Air Force Commander General Francisco Braco Carbo performed a formation flight with two Hürjet prototypes.

On 30 August 2026 first production jet flew.

== Future operators ==
=== Turkey ===
The initial procurement order of 4 Block 0 units (with option of additional 12 Block 1 units) was later converted to a final order of 16 units with advancement of delivery dates.

=== Spain ===
In July 2024, a TAI Hürjet flew to Spain, participating in the tender to replace Spain's ageing Northrop F-5 fleet. The next month, there were rumors that Spain is interested in procurement of 24 Hürjets, in exchange for six Airbus A400M tactical airlifters, which were then softly denied by the Turkish Ministry of National Defense. On 20 December 2024, Spanish and Turkish officials signed the memorandum for cooperation, formalizing the deal for the first time. With the agreement signed between TAI, Airbus and the Spanish Ministry of Defense on May 14, 2025, it was reported that the Spanish Air Force would receive 24 Hürjets through joint infrastructure production. On 28 October 2025, the Spanish government approved a 3.1-billion euro acquisition contract for 45 Hürjets instead of 24 along with related equipment. In December 2025, Spain finalized the order for 30 TAI Hürjets with deliveries beginning in 2028.

As part of Spain’s acquisition of the HÜRJET advanced jet trainer, HAVELSAN’s Flight and Mission Planning System (FSGP) and full-mission flight simulator were selected as core components of the program and will be exported alongside the aircraft.

=== Potential operators ===
==== United States ====
The TAI Hürjet will participate in the US Navy tender to replace its T-45 Goshawk aircraft. The replacement plan has been delayed by 2 years, postponing the period to the second quarter of 2028. The US Navy will acquire 145 jet trainers in total. Participants will be the Boeing T-7A Red Hawk, TF-50N version of KAI T-50 modified in cooperation with Lockheed Martin, M-346N version of Alenia Aermacchi M-346 modified in cooperation with Textron, a version of TAI Hürjet modified in cooperation with Sierra Nevada Corporation to meet US Navy criteria.

==== Japan ====
In a May 28, 2026 analysis, Japanese military journalist Osamu Takeuchi reported that Turkish Aerospace Industries (TAI) has expressed strong interest in offering the Hürjet as a potential successor to the Japan Air Self-Defense Force's Kawasaki T-4 trainers, describing it as a possible "dark horse" candidate.

==== United Kingdom ====
The TAI Hurjet is one of a number of alternative options that have been suggested for the UK's fast jet trainer programme following the retirement of the BAE Systems Hawk.

=== Failed bids ===
==== Malaysia ====
The TAI Hürjet participated in the Malaysia Light combat aircraft tender which started in 2021. Malaysia had a budget of $900 million to acquire 18 LCA. The companies and their products that submitted their bids for the tender for the light combat aircraft of the Malaysian Air Force were the KAI T-50, TAI Hürjet, Aero L-39NG, Alenia Aermacchi M-346, HAL Tejas, and Mikoyan MiG-35. In 2023 Malaysia announced the KAI T-50 as a winner of the tender.

== Variants ==
Trainer
Advanced supersonic jet trainer version
- Block 0 - prototype variant
- Block 1 - production variant

SNC/TAI Freedom
An aircraft based on the same design for the U.S. Air Force's T-X program, developed in cooperation with Sierra Nevada Corporation (SNC). The program aimed to find a successor to the Northrop T-38 Talon. The companies formed Freedom Aircraft Ventures LLC, based in Centennial, Colorado, to develop the aircraft. The SNC/TAI proposal lost to the Boeing-Saab T-7 Red Hawk.

Light Combat Aircraft
Version for close air support and armed air policing roles. The combat variant will carry locally produced air-to-air missiles and air-to-ground bombs.

== Specifications ==
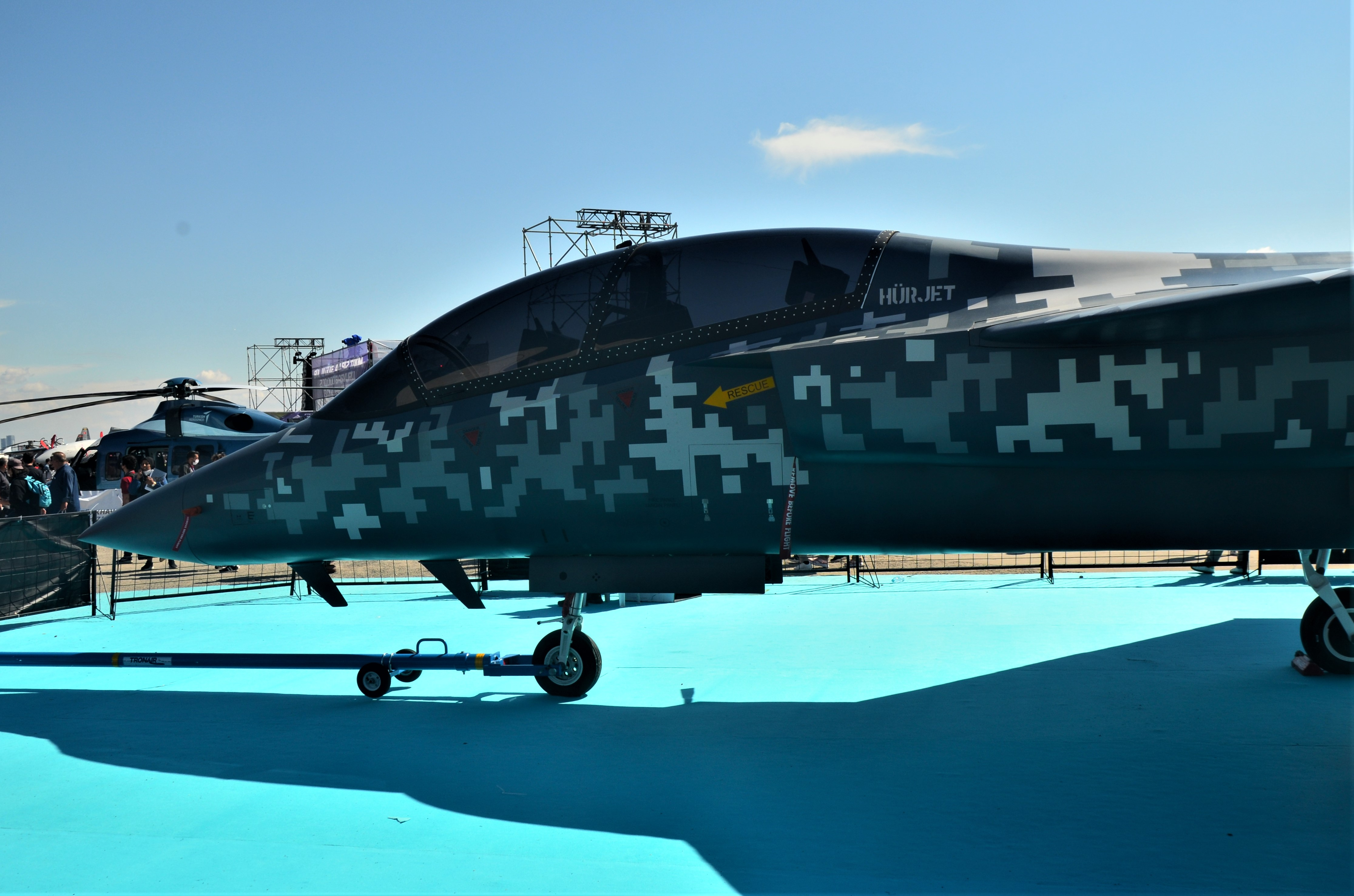
The cockpit of the TAI Hürjet at Teknofest 2021

Data from Turkish Aerospace Industries

General characteristics

- Crew: 2
- Length: 13.6 m (44 ft 9 in)
- Wingspan: 9.5 m (31 ft 2 in)
- Height: 4.1 m (13 ft 5 in)
- Wing area: 25 m^{2} (270 sq ft)
- Payload: 3,402 kg (7,500 lb)
- Powerplant: 1 × General Electric F404-GE-104 afterburning turbofan engine, 53.07 kN (11,930 lbf) thrust dry, 78.7 kN (17,700 lbf) with afterburner

Performance

- Maximum speed: Mach 1.4
- Range: 1,960 km (1,220 mi, 1,060 nmi)
- Service ceiling: 14,000 m (45,000 ft)
- g limits: +8 −3
- Rate of climb: 246 m/s (48,500 ft/min)

Armament

- Hardpoints: Provision for a total of seven pylon stations (one × under-fuselage, four × under-wing plus two × wingtip)

== See also ==
Aircraft of comparable role, configuration, and era

- AIDC T-5 Brave Eagle
- Aeralis Advanced Jet Trainer
- Alenia Aermacchi M-346 Master
- Boeing-Saab T-7 Red Hawk
- Hongdu JL-10
- KAI T-50 Golden Eagle
- Yakovlev Yak-130
