= Honeywell/ITEC F124 =

US low-bypass turbofan

F124 / F125
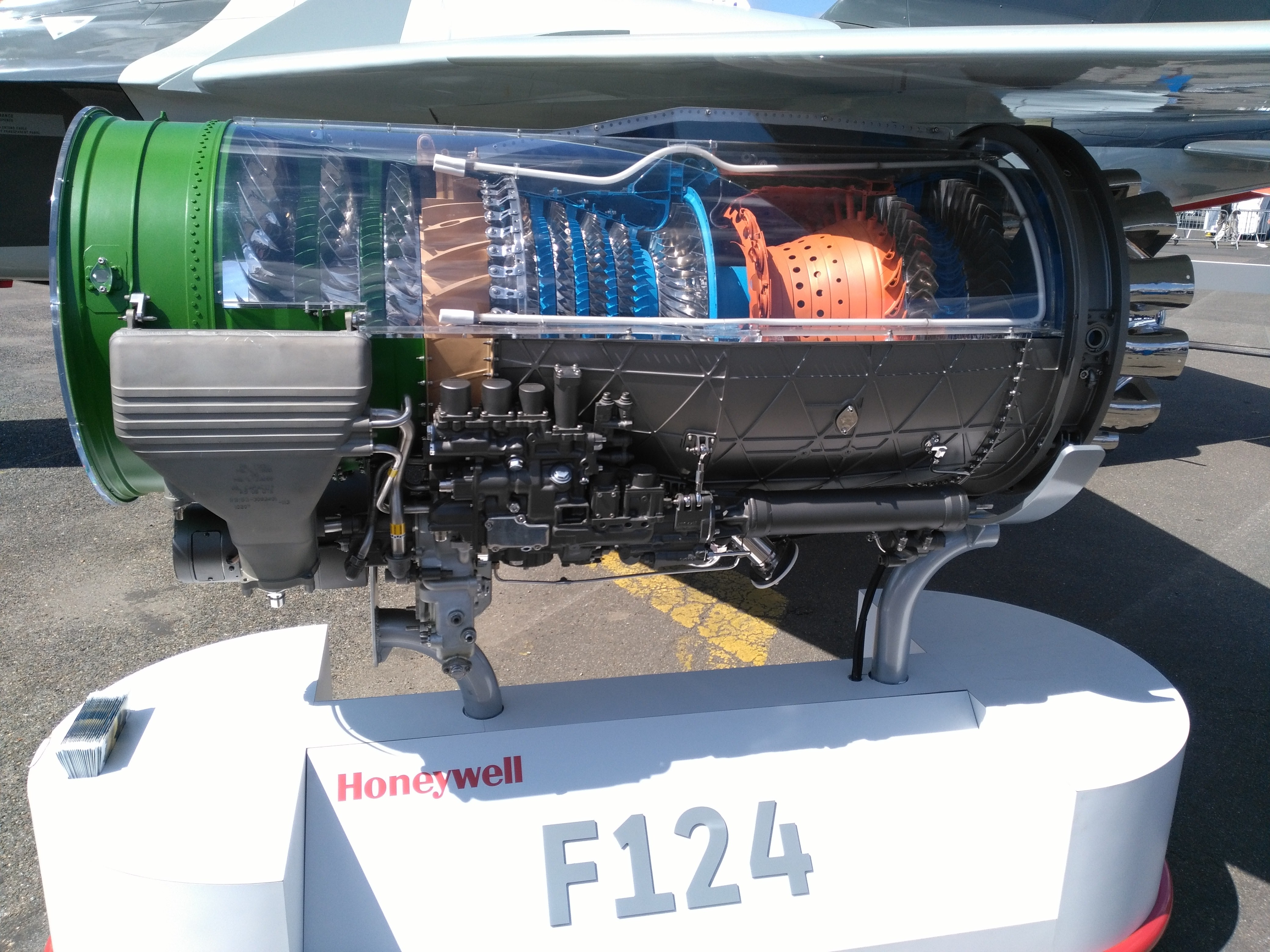
- Honeywell F124 cutaway
- Type: Turbofan
- National origin: United States; Taiwan (Republic of China)
- Manufacturer: International Turbine Engine Corporation / Honeywell
- Designer: Garrett AiResearch
- First run: 1979
- Major applications: Aermacchi M-346; Aero L-159 Alca; AIDC F-CK-1 Ching-kuo; AIDC T-5 Brave Eagle
- Number built: 460 (by 2004)
- Developed from: Honeywell TFE731

The Honeywell/ITEC F124 is a low-bypass turbofan engine derived from the civilian Honeywell TFE731. The F125 is an afterburning version of the engine. The engine began development in the late 1970s for the Republic of China (Taiwan) Air Force AIDC F-CK Indigenous Defence Fighter (IDF), and it first ran in 1979. The F124/F125 engine has since been proposed for use on other aircraft, such as the T-45 Goshawk and the SEPECAT Jaguar. It powers the Aero L-159 Alca and the Alenia Aermacchi M-346. The F124 has a rather unusual design for a two spool gas turbine engine, using both axial and centrifugal compressors in its high-pressure compressor. There are only three production variants of the engine, although several more have been proposed over its lifespan.

== Development ==
In 1978, Garrett announced joint research on the TFE1042 afterburner with Swedish company Volvo Flygmotor AB in order to provide an engine for the AIDC F-CK Indigenous Defence Fighter (IDF) being developed for the Republic of China (Taiwan) Air Force (ROCAF). The TFE731 Model 1042 was touted as a low bypass ratio "military derivative of the proven commercial TFE731 engine" and "provides efficient, reliable, cost effective propulsion for the next generation of light strike and advanced trainer aircraft", with thrust of 4,260 lbf (18.9 kN) dry and 6,790 lbf (30.2 kN) with afterburner. After initial negotiation, the investment was going to be divided between Garrett, Volvo, AIDC, and Italian company Piaggio. The development would consist of the non-afterburning TFE1042-6 for light attack aircraft/advanced trainer, and TFE1042-7 for the AMX or F-5 upgrade. Garrett would be responsible for the core engine, and Volvo would be responsible for the fan section and the afterburner. The engine first ran for 3 hours at a Volvo test facility in 1979.

AIDC also suggested upgrading TFE1042-7 to 8,000 lbf (36 kN) thrust as twin engine solution, in order to compete with General Electric F404 for applications such as the JAS 39 Gripen. However, the Gripen project decided to continue with a single engine F404 variant, built by Volvo, and Volvo left the project to at that point to focus on the Gripen work. Piaggio asked to participate at a later date due to financial reasons and left the program as well. Thus only Garrett and AIDC invested in the new International Turbine Engine Corporation (ITEC), with the contract signed in 1982.

In 1988, ITEC decided to invest in the 12,000 lbf (53 kN) TFE1088-12, which was re-designated as TFE1042-70A (for political reason as well). Preliminary study had shown that IDF could supercruise with the new engine. At the same time, GE decided to enter the market with J101/SF, a smaller version of F404. However, after the IDF order was cut in half due to budget concerns, the TFE1088-12 engine upgrade plan ended as well. The F-CK IDF first flew in 1989, and aircraft were delivered through 1999.

Garrett introduced the TFE742 concept in the early 1990s. Consisting of an uprated core from the TFE1042, the TFE742 was promoted for a twin-engine version of the BAe 146, the MPC 75, and other prospective aircraft. Targeting the 70-130 seat passenger aircraft market, the TFE742 was a 18,000 lbf thrust (80 kN; 8,200 kgf), high-bypass turbofan driven by a gearbox.

In the mid-1990s, AlliedSignal considered developing a turboprop engine for the European Future Large Aircraft military transport (later known as the Airbus A400M), which was to be based on the core of the TFE1042. AlliedSignal, AIDC, and other Asian partners also derived an industrial gas turbine from the TFE1042, initially as the 12,000-horsepower (9-megawatt) AS1042, which evolved into the 13,000 hp (10 MW) ASE120.

=== T-45 Goshawk / BAE Systems Hawk ===
In the early 1990s, the United States Navy considered the re-engining their fleet of T-45 Goshawk trainer aircraft with the F124. On 7 October 1996, a T-45A test aircraft flew, powered by the rival F124 engine.

The possibility of a F124-powered T-45 arose again in 1996 when McDonnell Douglas offered an F124-engined T-45 to the Royal Australian Air Force as a competitor for their trainer requirement. BAe wanted to offer the F124 as an option on their entry for the RAAF trainer requirement, the BAE Hawk (which the T-45 is based on), but ITEC refused to give BAe permission to offer it. ITEC's decision turned out to be a mistake, as the RAAF select the Hawk as their trainer. However, after the selection of the aircraft, the RAAF decided to have a separate competition between the F124 and the Rolls-Royce Turbomeca Adour (which was BAe's selection) to power the new trainers. In 1997 the RAAF elected to use the Adour engine, effectively ending the F124's chances of being used on Hawk or T-45 aircraft.

=== L-159 ===
In 1994, the F124 engine was selected to power the Czech Aero L-159 Alca light combat aircraft. The combination first flew in 1997.

=== M-346 ===
In 2000, Alenia Aermacchi announced that their new M-346 trainer/light attack aircraft would be powered by the F124 engine, choosing it over its common rival, the Adour. In 2009, the United Arab Emirates announced that their M-346 trainers would be powered by the F124-GA-200.

=== X-45A ===
The F124 engine powered the Boeing X-45A unmanned combat aerial vehicle demonstrator in the early 2000s.

=== T-5 Brave Eagle ===
In 2017 the Aerospace Industrial Development Corporation announced that their AIDC T-5 Brave Eagle would use a variant of the F124.

=== Possible Jaguar usage ===
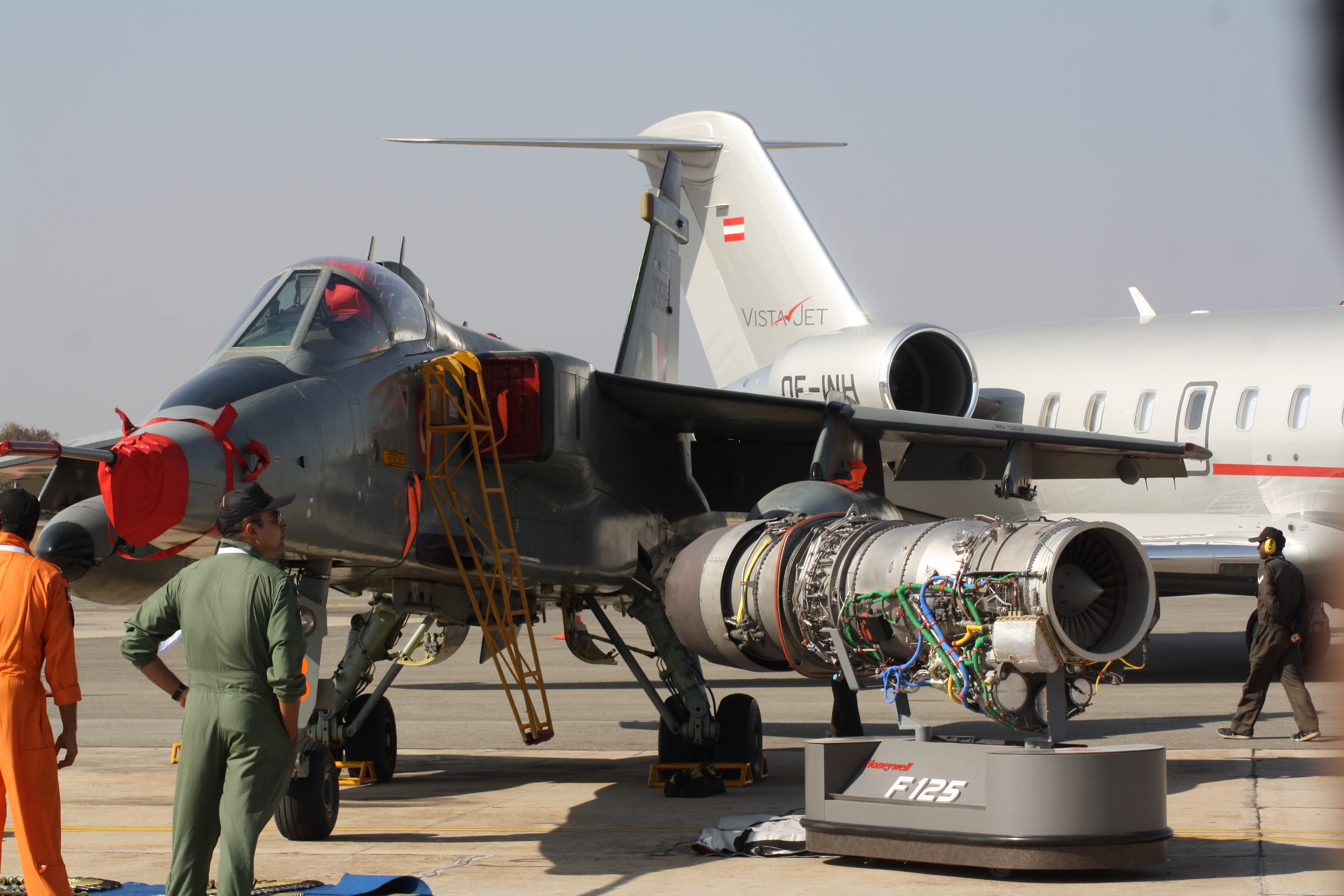
Honeywell's F125 engine for IAF Jaguar at Aero India 2013

The afterburning F125 engine was being considered, in 2009, by the Indian Air Force as a replacement for the Rolls-Royce Turbomeca Adour engines in their SEPECAT Jaguar aircraft. The new engine would be both lighter and more powerful. It was successfully demonstrated in 2007. This proposal of Indian Air Force to up-engine its fleet of SEPECAT Jaguar ground attack aircraft stalled after a decade in August 2019 owing to the high cost involved. Jane's quoted that Honeywell quoted a price of US$2.4 billion ₹18,500 crore (equivalent to ₹230 billion or US$3 billion in 2023) for 180 F-125IN turbofan engines as replacements for the Rolls-Royce Turbomeca Adour Mk 811 powerpacks originally installed in the Jaguars.

== Design ==
The F124 engine is a low-bypass, two-spool engine (meaning that there are two rotating shafts, a high-pressure shaft and a low-pressure shaft). The fan/low-pressure compressor has three stages with titanium blades. The first stage has 30 blades, and the overall pressure ratio for the three-stage fan is 2.5:1. Some of the air is bypassed (Bypass ratio of 0.472:1), and the rest is fed to the high-pressure compressor.

The high-pressure compressor (HPC) has four axial stages and a fifth centrifugal stage. All the blades and the impeller are made from titanium.

The fuel is burned in an annular combustor and the core flow passes through a single-stage high-pressure turbine (HPT) followed by a single-stage low-pressure turbine. The HPT is air-cooled. The bypass air from the fan and the exhaust from the core are mixed before exiting through a common nozzle. In the F125 variant of the engine, the mixed flow passes through the afterburner section. The F124 does not have an afterburner.

== Variants ==
F124-GA-100

- This is the original variant of the engine. It powered the Boeing X-45 demonstrator.

F124-GA-200

- Slightly de-rated variant of the F124-GA-100; the maximum thrust is 6250 lbf (27.80 kN) and the engine weighs 28 lb (13 kg) less. This variant utilizes an all-new accessory gearbox, as well as other small upgrades. This variant is used in the Aermacchi M-346.

F124-GA-400

- Variation of the F124-GA-100, modified for the T-45 Goshawk and the BAE Hawk. The engine was flight tested in the T-45, but the United States Navy decided not to re-engine the aircraft with this engine.

F125-GA-100

- Also known as the TFE1042-70. This is the basic afterburning variant of the engine, 27 kN (6,100 lbf) thrust dry, 42.1 kN (9,500 lbf) with afterburner. 325 produced for the AIDC F-CK-1 Ching-kuo program.

F125X

- Proposed advanced variant of the F125 engine, with a maximum thrust of 12,500 lbf (56 kN).

F125XX

- Further advanced variant of the F125 engine, this one producing 16,400 lbf (73 kN) of thrust. If it were built, there would have been a related F124XX non-afterburning variant, producing 10,800 lbf (48 kN) of thrust.

Vega Project

- Taiwan NCSIST has formulated a plan for the "Vega Project" since 2014. "Vega" project being halted in 2024.

== Applications ==
F124

- Aero L-159 Alca
- AIDC T-5 Brave Eagle
- Alenia Aermacchi M-346 Master
- Boeing X-45

F125

- AIDC F-CK-1 Ching-kuo

== Specifications (F124-GA-100) ==
Data from

==== General characteristics ====
- Type: Turbofan
- Length: 102.1 in (259 cm)
- Diameter: 36 in (91.4 cm)
- Dry weight: 1,050 lb (521.6 kg)

==== Components ====
- Compressor: 3 axial fan (low pressure compressor) stages, 4 axial high pressure compressor stages, 1 centrifugal high pressure compressor stage
- Turbine: 1 stage high pressure turbine, 1 stage low pressure turbine

==== Performance ====
- Maximum thrust: 6,280 lbf (28 kN)
- Overall pressure ratio: 19.4:1
- Bypass ratio: 0.49:1
- Turbine inlet temperature: 1,617 K (2,911 °R; 1,344 °C; 2,451 °F)
- Specific fuel consumption: 0.81 lb/(lbf⋅h) (23 g/(kN⋅s))
- Thrust-to-weight ratio: 5.3:1

== See also ==
Related development

- Garrett TFE731

Comparable engines

- HAL HTFE-25
- IHI Corporation XF5
- Ivchenko-Progress AI-322
- Rolls-Royce Turbomeca Adour
- TEI-TF6000

Related lists

- List of aircraft engines
