= AIDC T-5 Brave Eagle =

Taiwanese advanced jet trainer

T-5 Brave Eagle
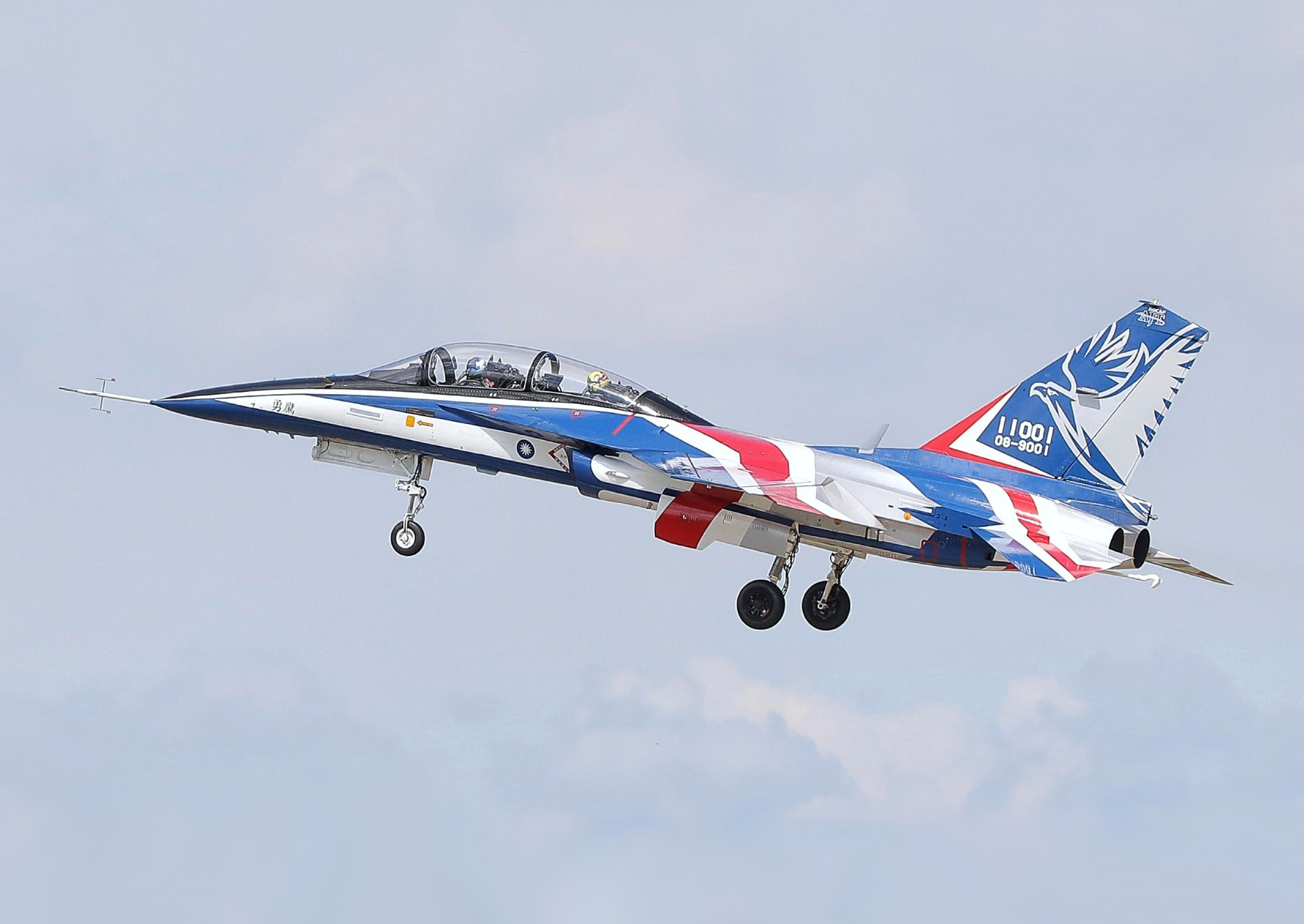
- A1 Prototype

General information
- Type: Advanced jet trainer
- National origin: Taiwan
- Manufacturer: Aerospace Industrial Development Corporation
- Designer: Aerospace Industrial Development Corporation and National Chung-Shan Institute of Science and Technology
- Status: In service
- Primary user: Republic of China Air Force
- Number built: 4 prototypes and 56 serials (May 2026)

History
- Manufactured: 2020–present
- Introduction date: 2021
- First flight: June 10, 2020
- Developed from: AIDC F-CK-1 Ching-kuo

The AIDC T-5 Brave Eagle (Chinese: 勇鷹; pinyin: Yǒngyīng) is a Taiwanese transonic advanced jet trainer aircraft developed by the Aerospace Industrial Development Corporation (AIDC).

== Development ==
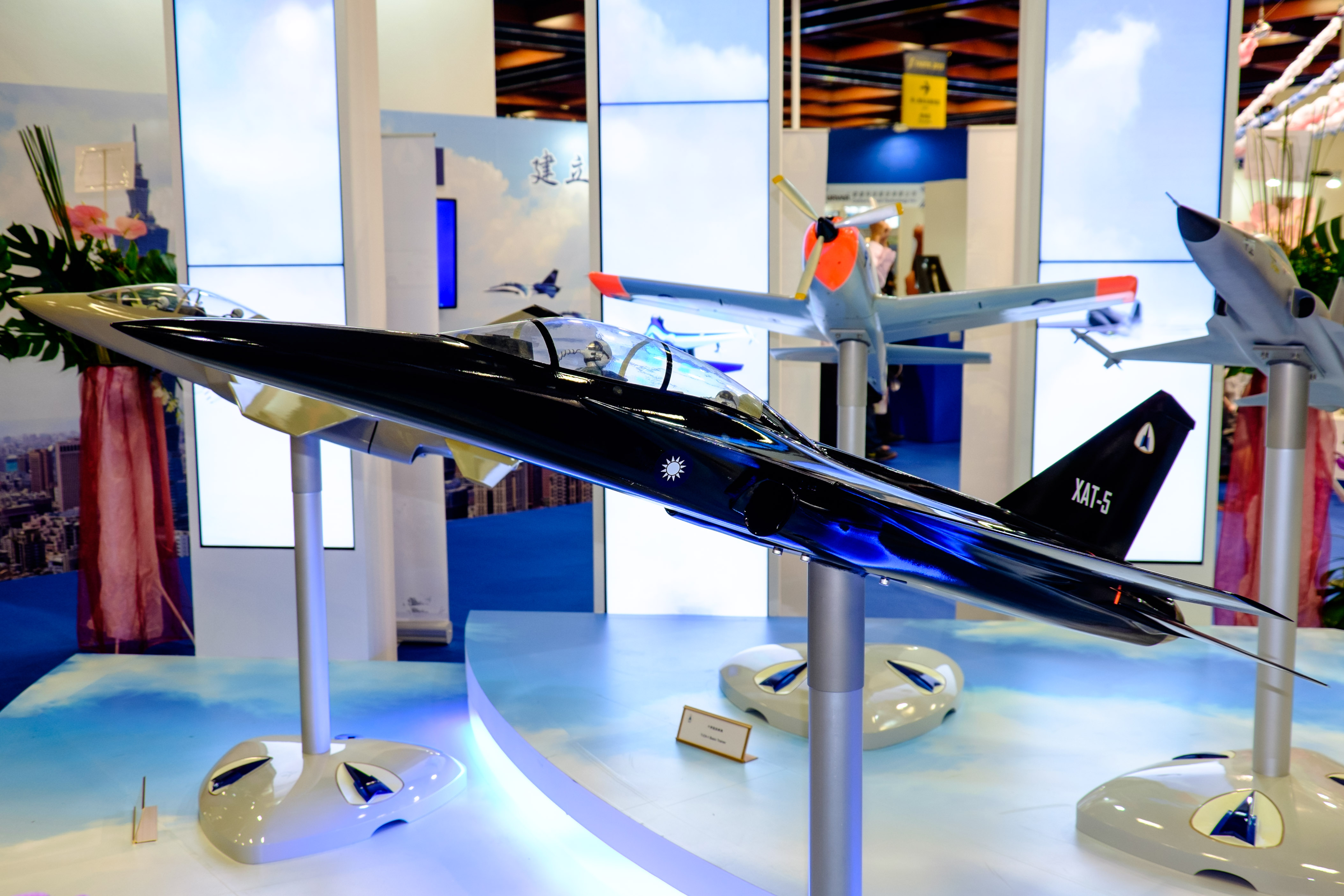
XAT-5 model displayed by AIDC in 2015

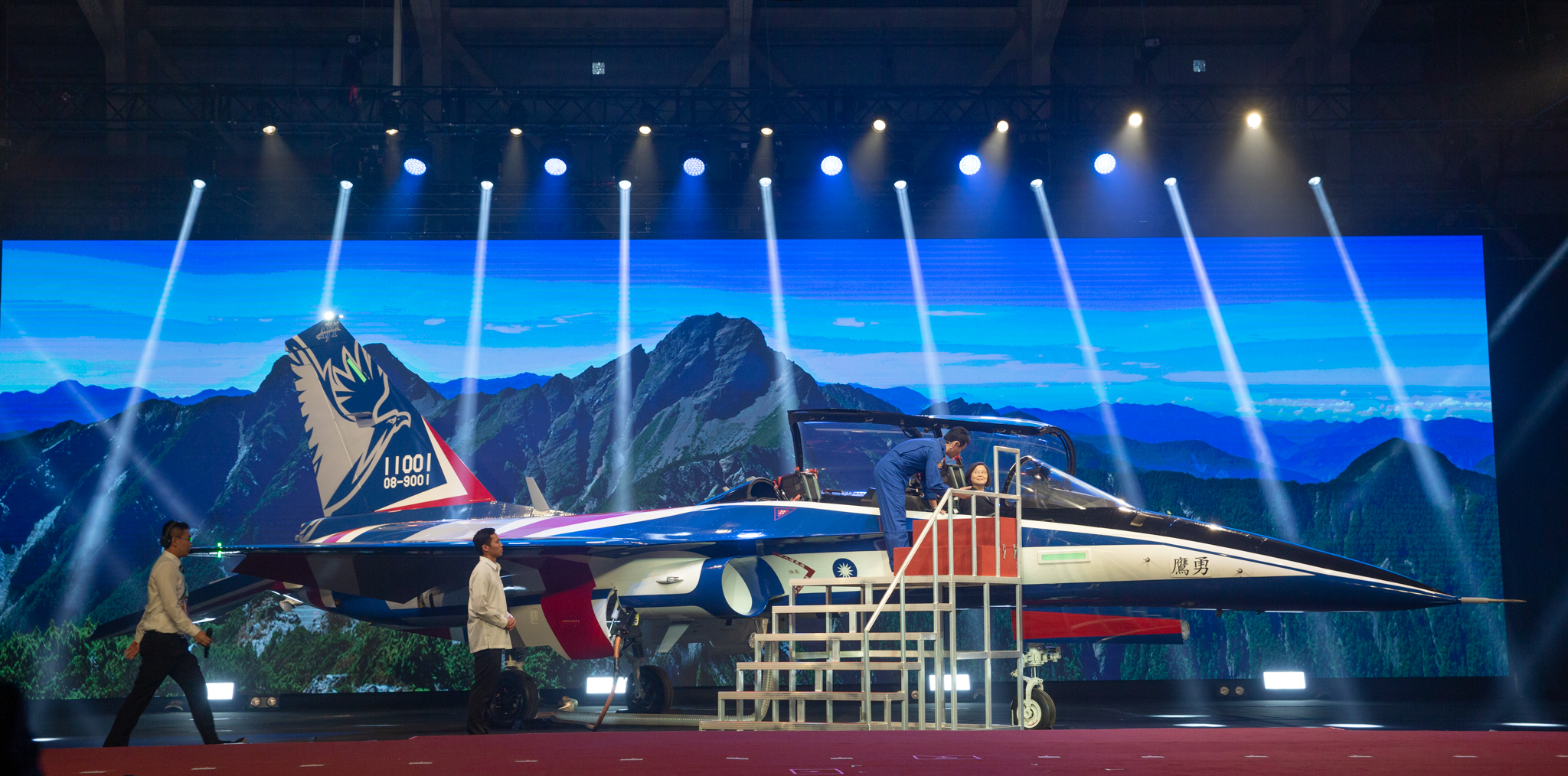
former Taiwanese President Tsai Ing-wen sits in a prototype at rollout

=== Advanced Jet Trainer Program ===
The Advanced Jet Trainer Program (AJT) began in the early 2000s as the Republic of China Air Force sought a replacement for its fleet of AIDC AT-3 and Northrop F-5 advanced trainers with 66 newly built aircraft. Three designs were proposed, a modernized, upgraded version of AT-3 branded as the AT-3 MAX, an evolution of the AIDC F-CK-1 Ching-Kuo combat aircraft to be called the XAT-5, or the Italian Alenia Aermacchi M-346 Master. In 2014 AIDC signed a memorandum of understanding with Alenia Aermacchi to assemble the M-346 in Taiwan. The engines of all M-346 are assembled in Taiwan by International Turbine Engine Company (ITEC), a joint partnership of Honeywell and AIDC. The MOD also evaluated the South Korean KAI T-50 Golden Eagle aircraft.

In 2017 it was announced that the XAT-5 had won the tender with development and production to be undertaken by a partnership of AIDC and the National Chung-Shan Institute of Science and Technology with delivery scheduled to begin in 2026. Four prototypes are to be produced and the total program cost is projected to be TWD68.6 billion (US$2.2 billion).

=== Naming ===
AIDC had used Blue Magpie, for the Taiwan blue magpie, as the project name. However in 2018 the Ministry of National Defense announced a contest to pick an official name for the aircraft. Taiwanese citizens were invited to submit a name with a short proposal with the winner receiving a NTD 30,000 prize. On 24 September 2019, the president Tsai Ing-wen officially named the new aircraft "Brave Eagle" (Yǒngyīng) during first prototype aircraft roll-out ceremony.

=== Production ===
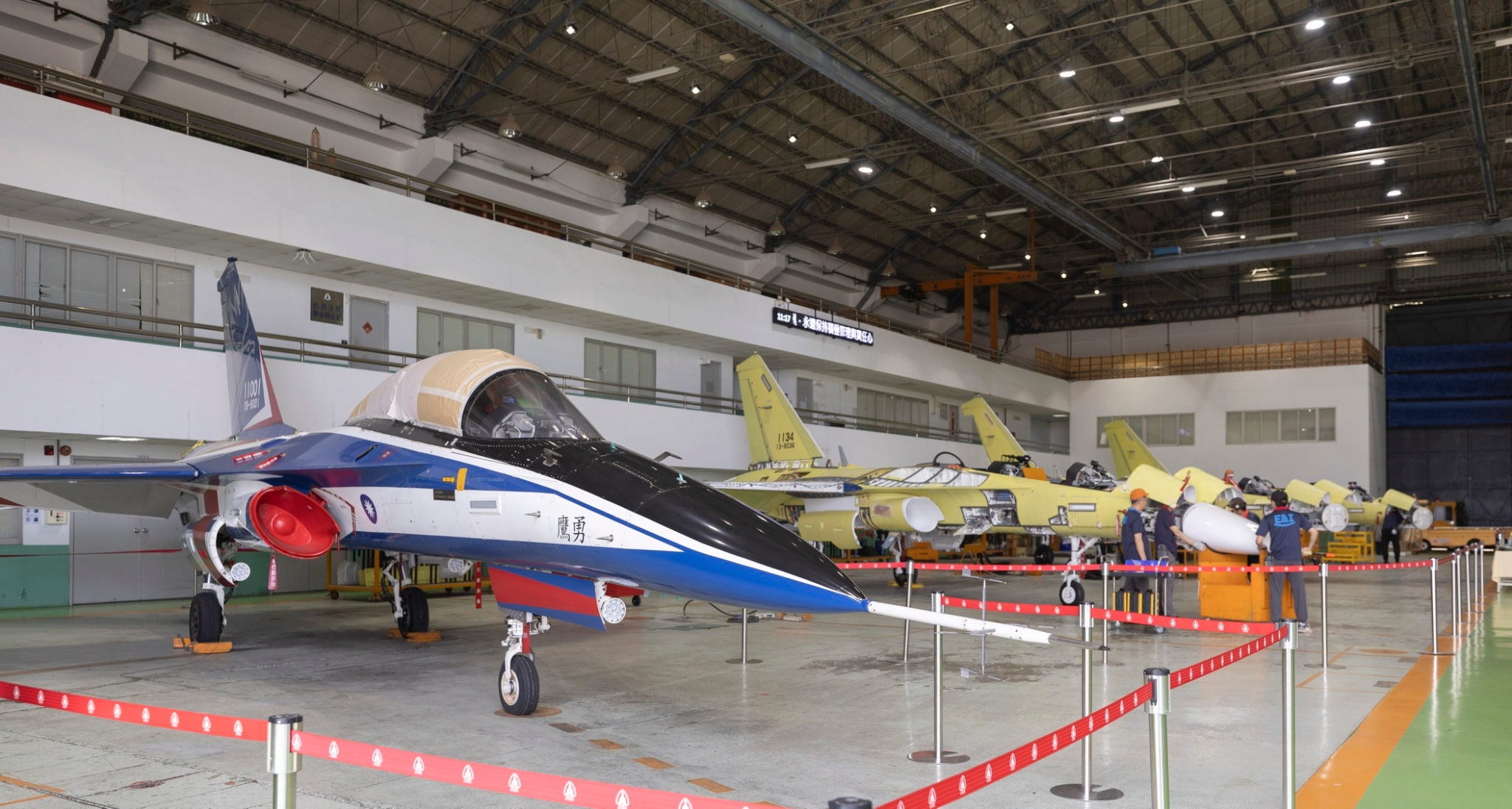
AIDC T-5 Brave Eagle production

In 2017, the United States approved the export of components for 132 Honeywell/ITEC F124 engines for the XAT/AT-5. In 2018, AIDC announced that the first prototype would be rolled out in September 2019 with flight tests to start in June 2020. In 2019 Taiwan’s Ministry of National Defense testified to the country’s legislature that the maiden flight is scheduled for June 2020, small scale production is to start in November 2021, and mass production is scheduled to commence March 2023.

In September 2019 A1, the first of four prototypes, was rolled out by Taiwanese President Tsai Ing-wen.

In March 2021 AIDC announced that they had completed internal flight tests and that testing of the two prototypes and the two initial aircraft due to be delivered by the end of the year would be conducted by the Taiwanese Air Force from then on. A number of internal and operational test flights were completed in July 2021 from Taitung Air Base with some operations occurring over the Pacific Ocean.

The first production model T-5 had its first flight on October 21, 2021. The first production model has the serial number 11003.

== Design ==
The design is based on the AIDC F-CK-1 Ching-kuo and shares the same engines, but has 80% new components including a composite body. Compared to the F-CK-1, it will have more advanced avionics, increased fuel capacity, and will be a little larger. The aerofoil is slightly revised, with the wings being thicker than on the F-CK-1 in order to increase stability at low speed and low altitude, as well as to provide increased fuel storage. The ram air scoop of the F-CK-1 has been redesigned in partnership with the Eaton Corporation with two aluminium laser powder bed fusion printed parts replacing 22 original parts. Meggitt will supply the main wheels, carbon brakes and brake control systems as they do on the AT-3 and F-CK-1. Martin-Baker will provide the ejection seat systems. More than 55% of its components are made in Taiwan. It has been reported that the aircraft was designed from the beginning to serve dual peacetime training and wartime combat roles.

=== Avionics and sensors ===
NCSIST is developing an airborne AESA radar for the T-5 Brave Eagle but private Taiwanese firm Tron Future Tech has also bid their gallium nitride based AESA for the program. In 2019 it was announced that Pyras Technology would supply the radar and communications antennas for the platform.

== Variants ==
In 2019 Jane's reported that a light fighter AT-5 variant was planned to replace the Northrop F-5E/F Tiger II fleet.

== Incidents ==
On 15 February 2025, the T-5 was involved in its first aviation incident. Both engines failed, and the sole occupant parachuted to safety as the aircraft crashed into the sea five nautical miles from Taitung City. The ROCAF grounded the T-5 fleet and began an investigation as pilot Lin Wei was treated at Mackay Memorial Hospital's Taitung Branch. Retired Lieutenant General Chang Yen-ting and Shu Hsiao-huang, an associate research fellow at the Institute for National Defense and Security Research, opined that a broken fan blade from one of the plane's engines striking the other could have caused both engines to fail. The plane's flight data recorder was recovered in March.

== Operators ==
Taiwan (Republic of China)

- Republic of China Air Force – 56 delivered as of May 2026 of 66 planned

== Specifications ==
Data from Airforce technology.

General characteristics

- Crew: two
- Length: 14.5 m (47.6 ft)
- Wingspan: 9.2 m (30.3 ft)
- Height: 4.39 m (14 ft 5 in)
- Empty weight: 4,500 kg (9,921 lb)
- Max takeoff weight: 7,500 kg (16,535 lb)
- Powerplant: 2 × Honeywell/ITEC F124-200TW turbofan, 27.8 kN (6,250 lbf) thrust each

Performance

- Maximum speed: 1,030 km/h (640 mph, 556 kn)
- Cruise speed: 1,013 km/h (629 mph, 547 kn)
- Range: 1,350 km (839 mi, 729 nmi)
- Ferry range: 1,350 km (839 mi, 729 nmi)
- Service ceiling: 13,000 m (42,651 ft)
- Rate of climb: 48 m/s (9,500 ft/min)

Armament

- Hardpoints: 2 (fitted for but not with) , with provisions to carry combinations of:
  - Missiles: Sky Sword I, AIM-9 and AGM-65 (fitted for but not with)

== Gallery ==
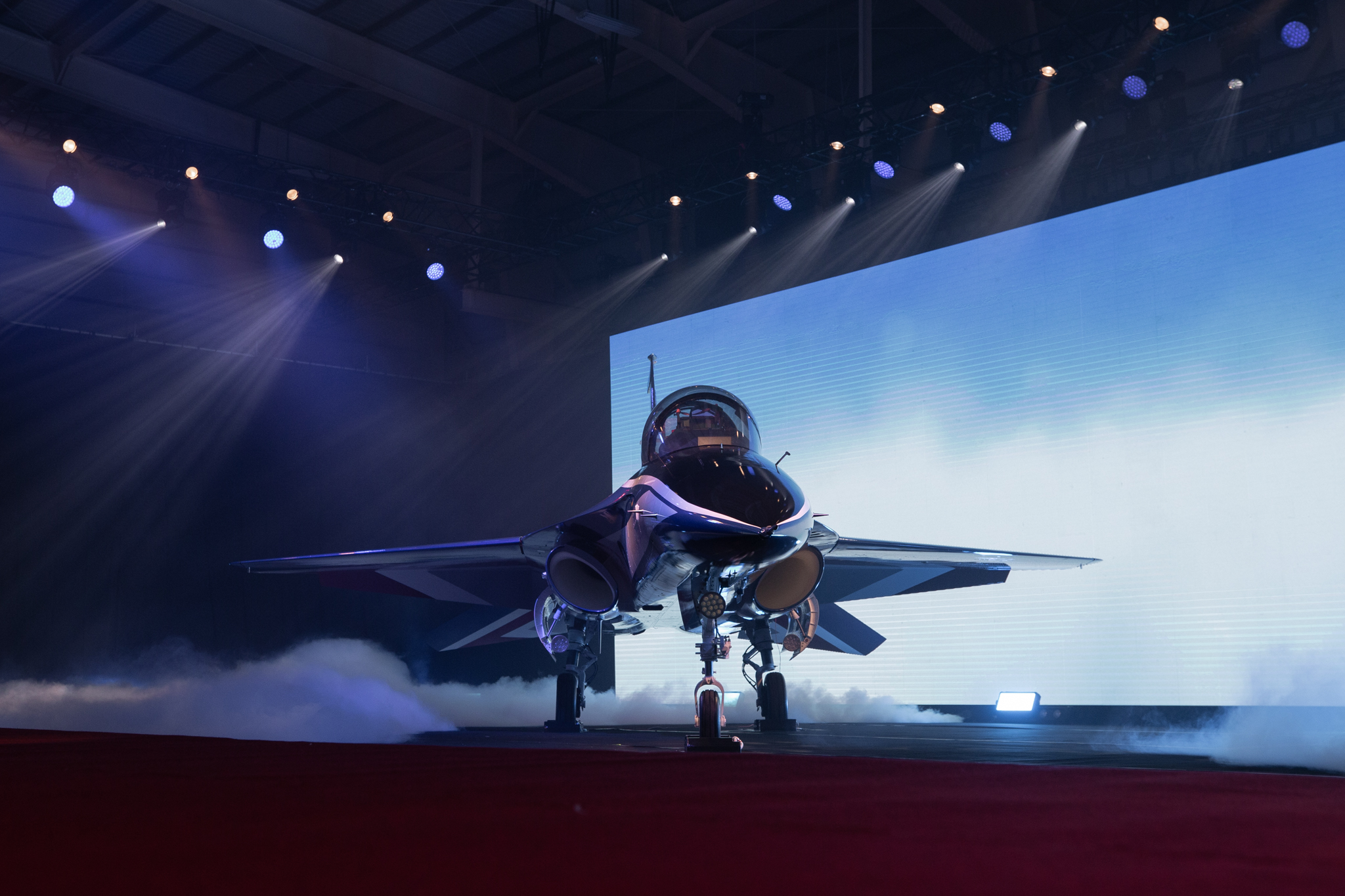
Prototype at rollout

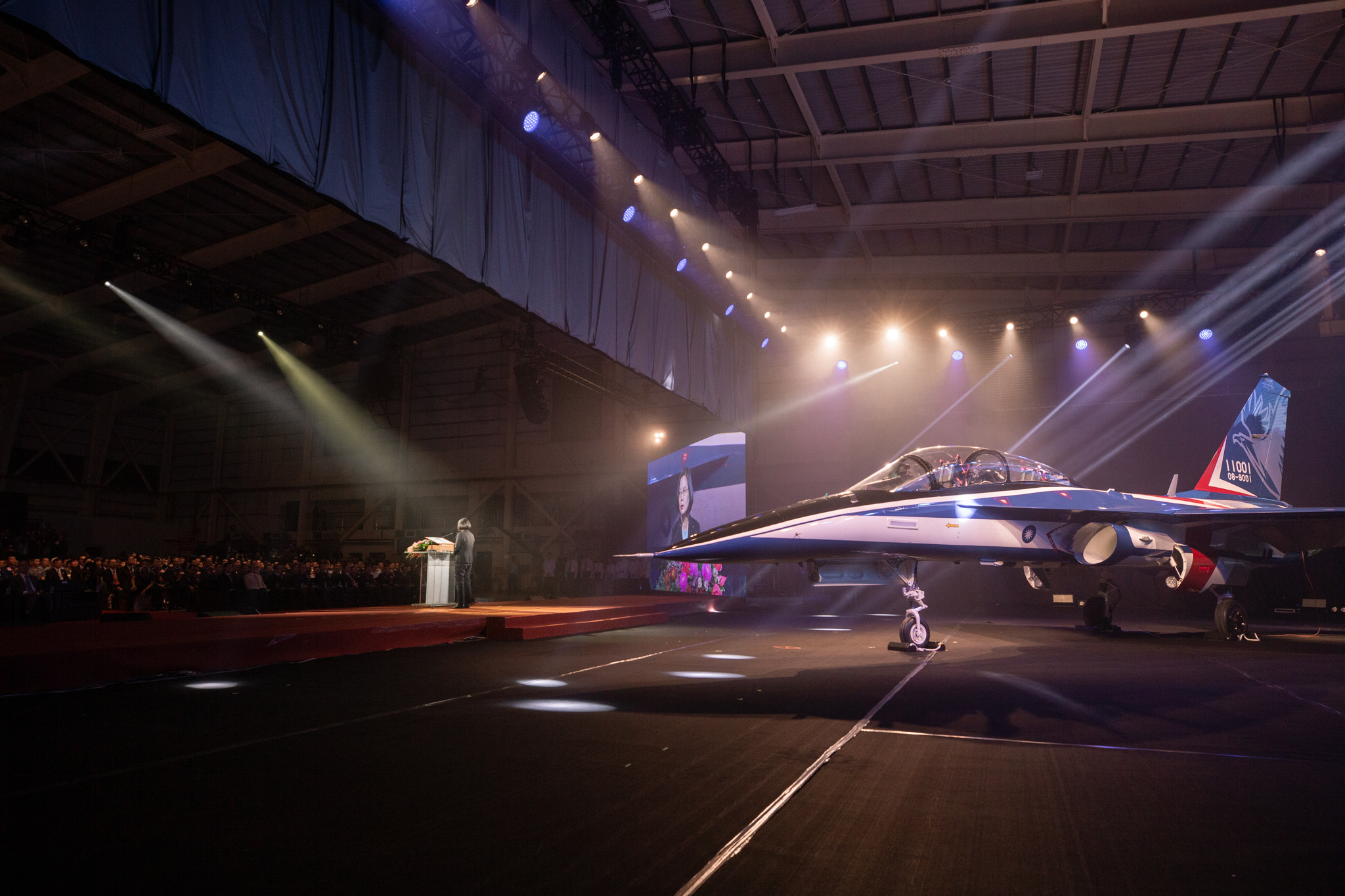
A1 Prototype rollout

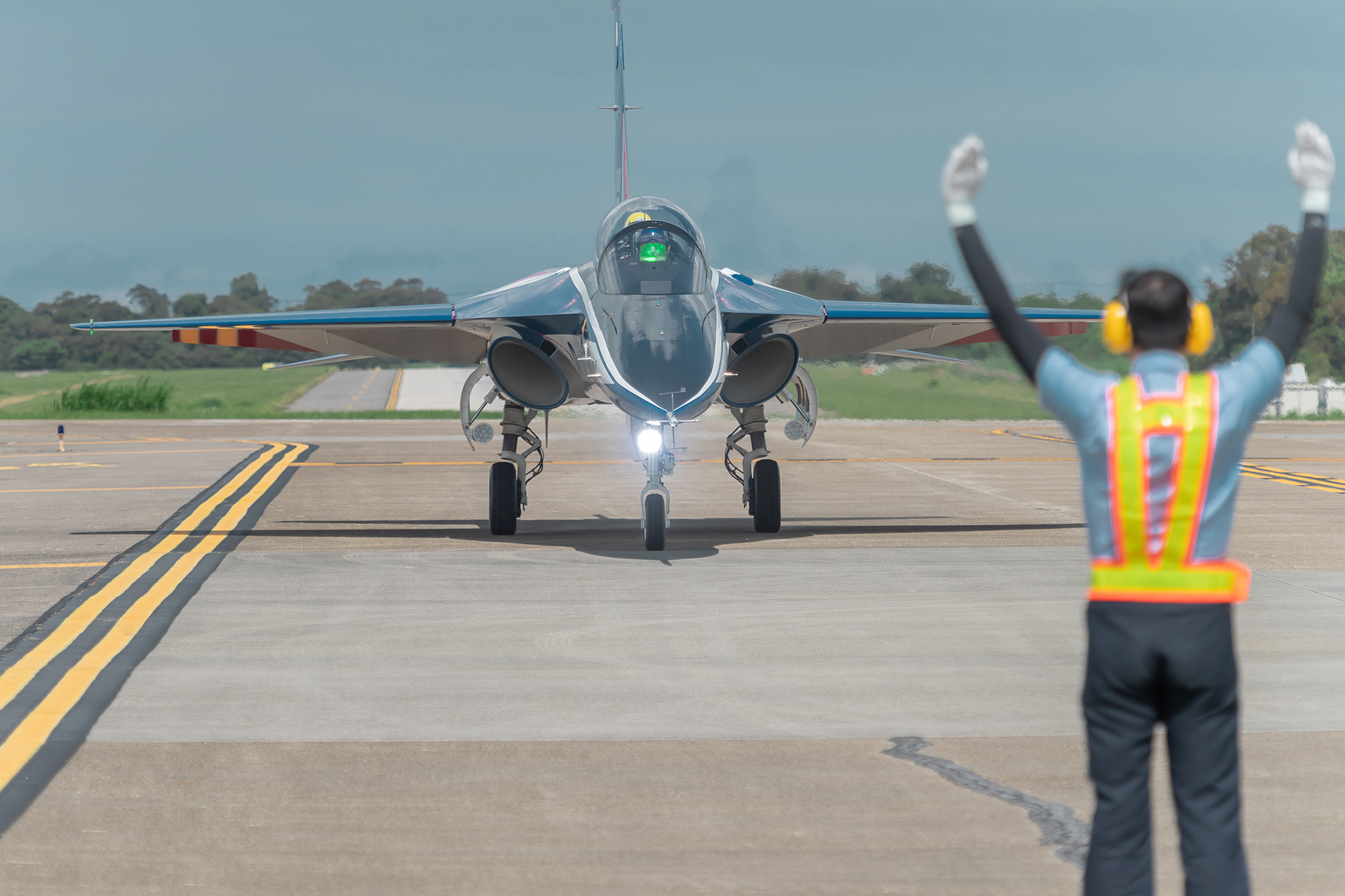
ROCAF T-5 in 2020

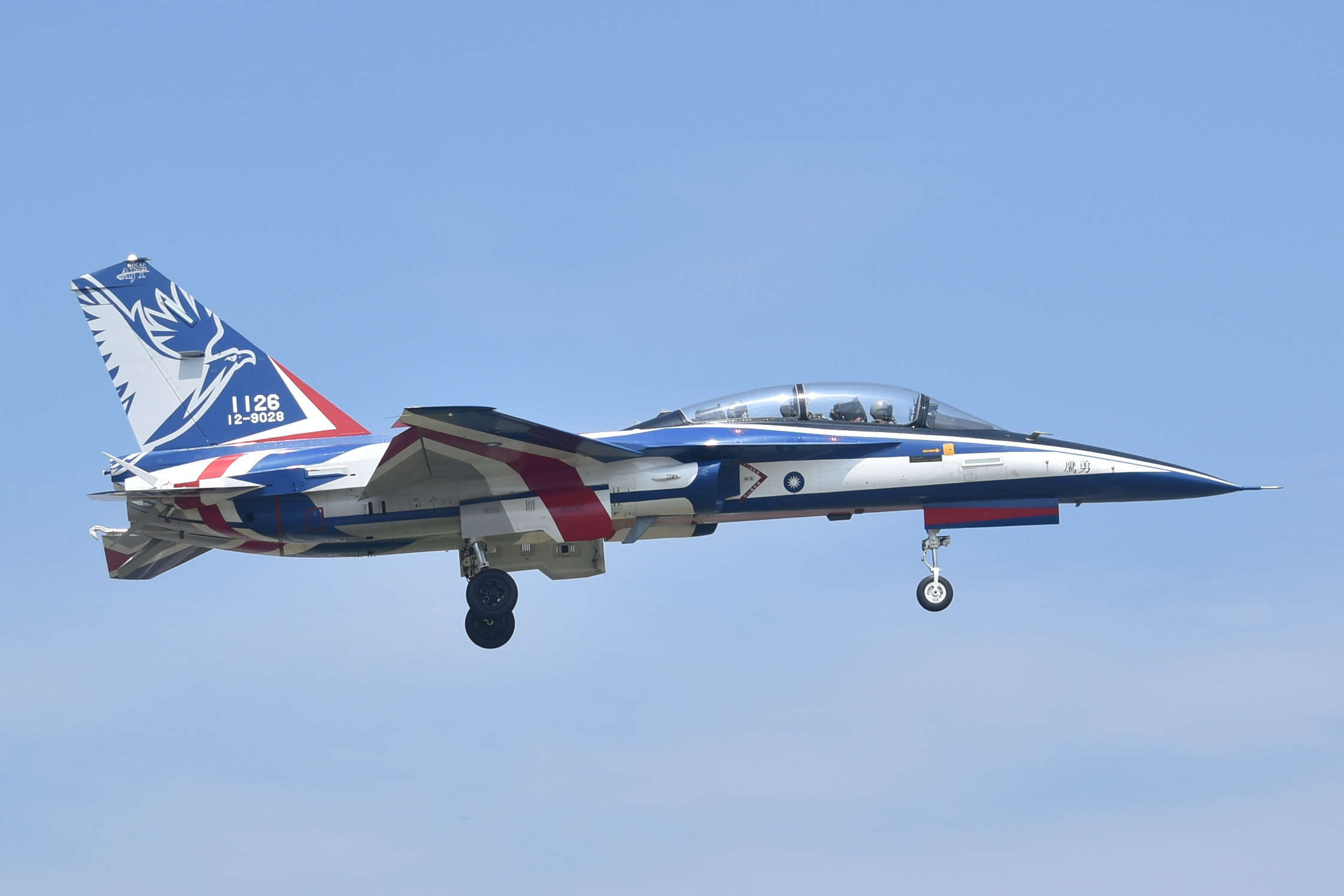
ROCAF T-5 (1126) in 2025

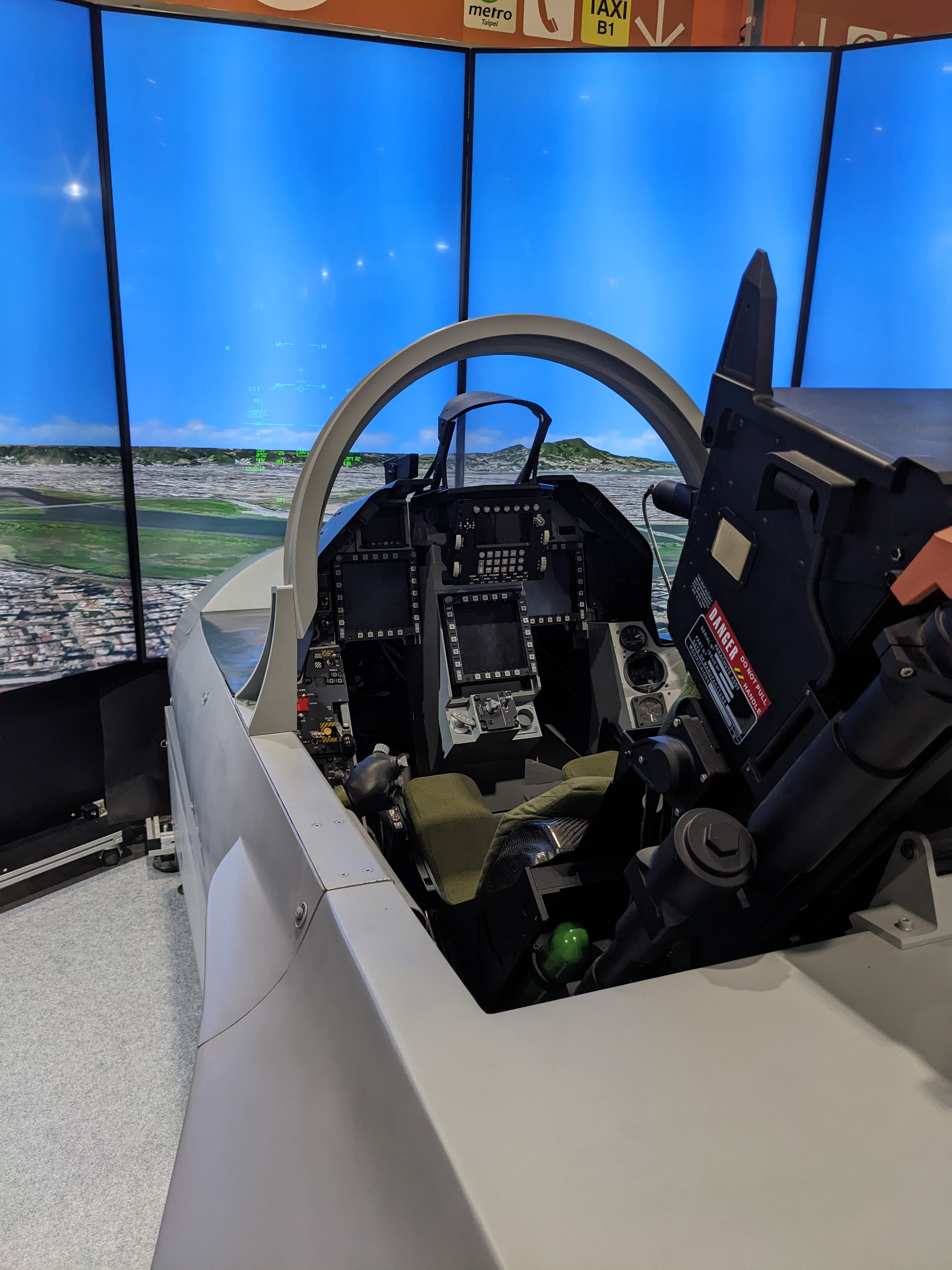
Basic flight trainer

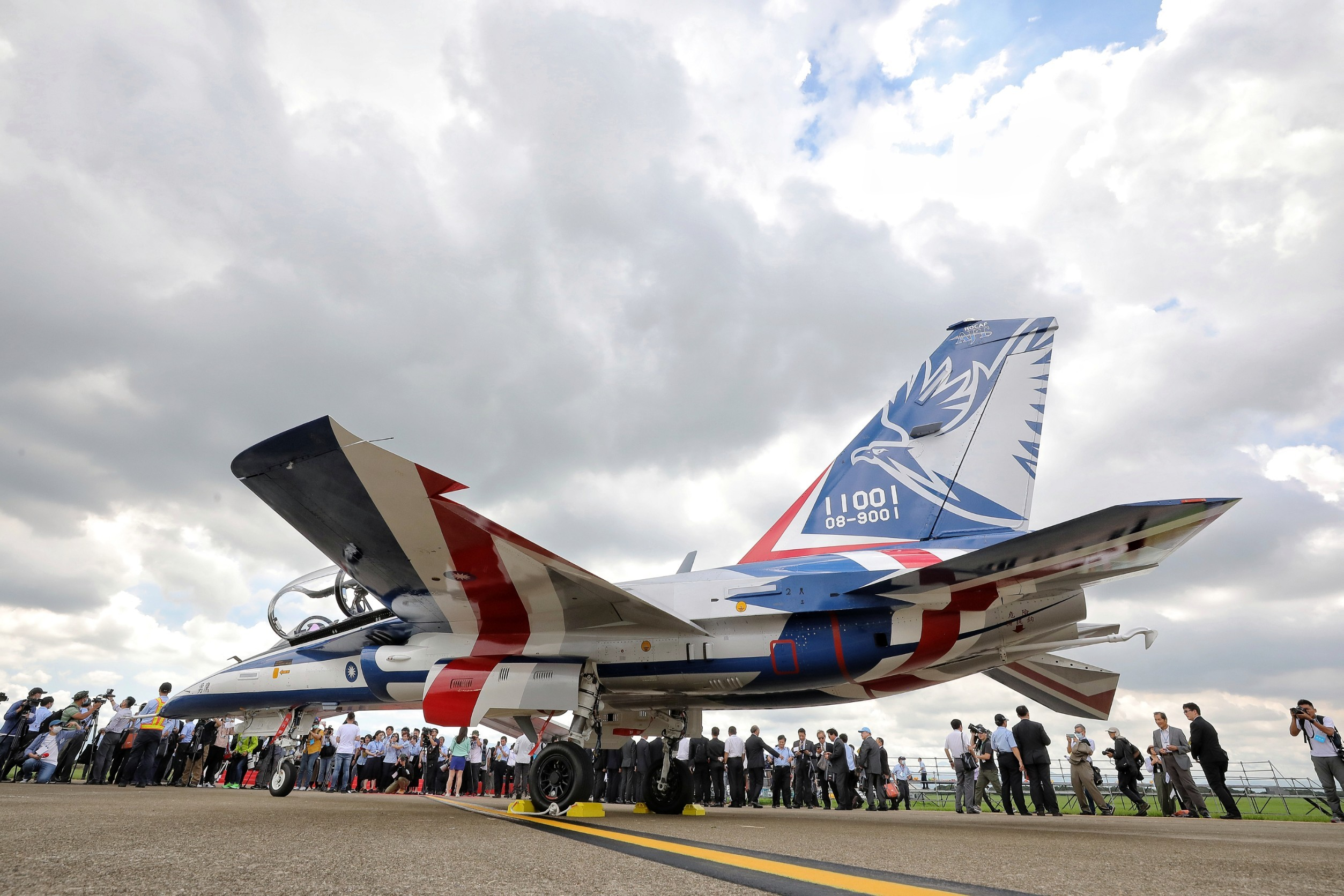
T-5 underside

== See also ==
- Defense industry of Taiwan

Related development

- AIDC F-CK-1 Ching-kuo

Aircraft of comparable role, configuration, and era

- Alenia Aermacchi M-346 Master
- Boeing T-7 Red Hawk
- Hongdu L-15
- KAI T-50 Golden Eagle
- TAI Hürjet
- Yakovlev Yak-130
