= International Turbine Engine Company =

International Turbine Engine Company LLC
- Type: Public
- Industry: Aerospace
- Predecessor: International Turbine Engine Corporation
- Founded: December 18, 2006; 19 years ago
- Headquarters: Phoenix, Arizona, US
- Key people: Juan Picon (CEO)
- Parent: Honeywell Aerospace and Aerospace Industrial Development Corporation

The International Turbine Engine Company LLC (ITEC, formerly the International Turbine Engine Corporation), is a joint venture between Honeywell Aerospace (formerly Garrett AiResearch, and later AlliedSignal), and the Aerospace Industrial Development Corporation (AIDC). The company produces the F124/F125 turbofan engine series, which is used in the Aermacchi M-346, Aero L-159 Alca, AIDC F-CK-1 Ching-kuo, and AIDC T-5 Brave Eagle. In 2017 the F124 and F125 Engines reached 1,000,000 operating hours.

== Products ==
- Honeywell F124 - standard
- Honeywell F125 - with afterburner

== See also ==
- Defense industry of Taiwan
