= David Buchler =

British businessman

David Julian Buchler is a British businessman, best known as a practitioner in the field of corporate recovery and restructuring. He is closely associated with Tottenham Hotspur F.C. and the English National Opera (ENO).

== Career ==
Educated at Highgate School in London, David Buchler entered the accountancy profession in 1970 as an articled clerk (trainee Chartered Accountant) with Bernard Phillips & Co. When the firm merged with Arthur Andersen in 1979, Buchler transferred as a Partner and continued to build his reputation as an insolvency practitioner. In 1988, he launched Buchler Phillips with his longtime business partner Peter Phillips, undertaking several high-profile corporate recovery assignments, including the receivership of Robert Maxwell's private estate. Buchler Phillips was acquired in 1999 by global consulting firm Kroll Inc..

In April 2008, it was reported that David Buchler was leading a private-equity backed approach to buying Kroll from its then parent, Marsh & McLennan. In December 2008, David Buchler entered the bid process to acquire stricken high street retailer Woolworths. Forming his independent business, DB Consultants, in 2005, David Buchler spent the 10 years that followed focusing on a diverse portfolio of complex restructuring and turnaround assignments with both publicly listed and private companies, often working as chairman. The most notable of these were leading the fraud investigation at Langbar International.

In 2009, Buchler launched a turnaround focused private equity business, Merchant Asset Partners, to raise £500m for a one-time only fund to invest in UK distressed deals. David Buchler has been Chairman of the Chinese investment group London Asia Capital since 2011 and of growth capital investor Volvere plc since 2013.

== Football ==
David Buchler has been involved in football club restructuring since 1992 when Buchler Phillips was appointed administrator to Harrow and Wealdstone FC. During the 1990s, he advised Luton Town F.C., Millwall F.C., Oxford United F.C., Swindon Town F.C. and Barnet F.C., before joining the board of Tottenham Hotspur F.C. where he was vice-chairman from 2001 to 2006. In 2002, David Buchler's eldest daughter, Sara, married Darren Dein, son of David Dein, the then vice-chairman of North London football rivals Arsenal F.C.

== Opera ==
A lifelong opera fan, David Buchler joined the board of the then financially troubled English National Opera in October 2006. Within months, he became Deputy chairman, a position he held for 10 years. He is presently ENO's Chairman of Directors Emeriti. In June 2017 David Buchler launched a website to chronicle his personal reviews of performances all over the world.
