= Aerospace Industrial Development Corporation =

Company in Taiwan

- Native name: 漢翔航空工業股份有限公司
- Type: Public
- Traded as: TWSE: 2634
- Industry: Aerospace
- Founded: 1 March 1969 (Aero Industry Development Center)
- Headquarters: Taichung, Taiwan
- Key people: Tsao Chin-ping (Chairman); Chuang Hsiu-mei (President)
- Products: Aerospace components, avionics, fighter aircraft
- Services: Aircraft maintenance
- Revenue: ▼NTD$35,452,130,000 (2025); NTD$39,338,315,000 (2024)
- Subsidiaries: International Turbine Engine Company
- Website: www.aidc.com.tw

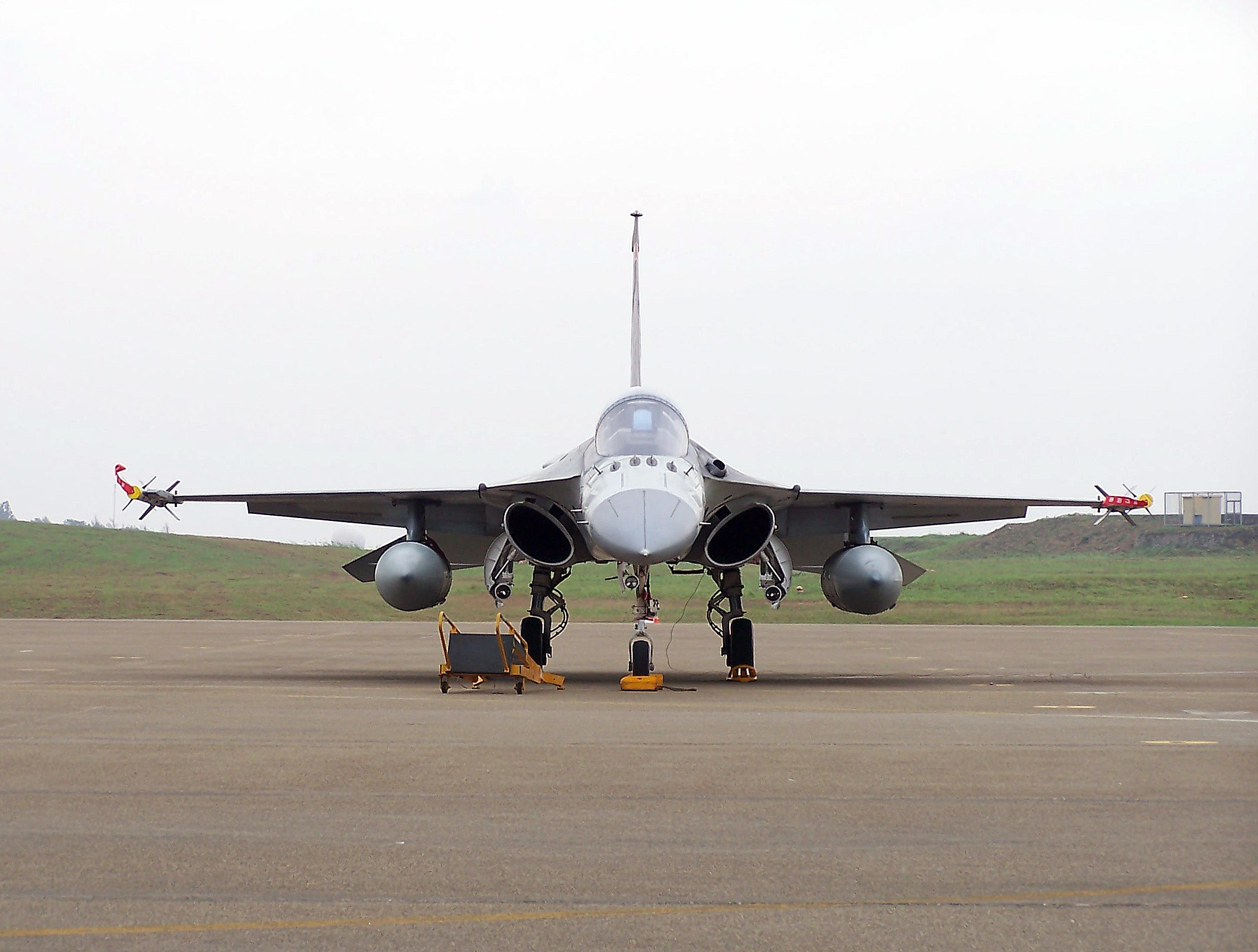
AIDC F-CK-1 Ching-kuo

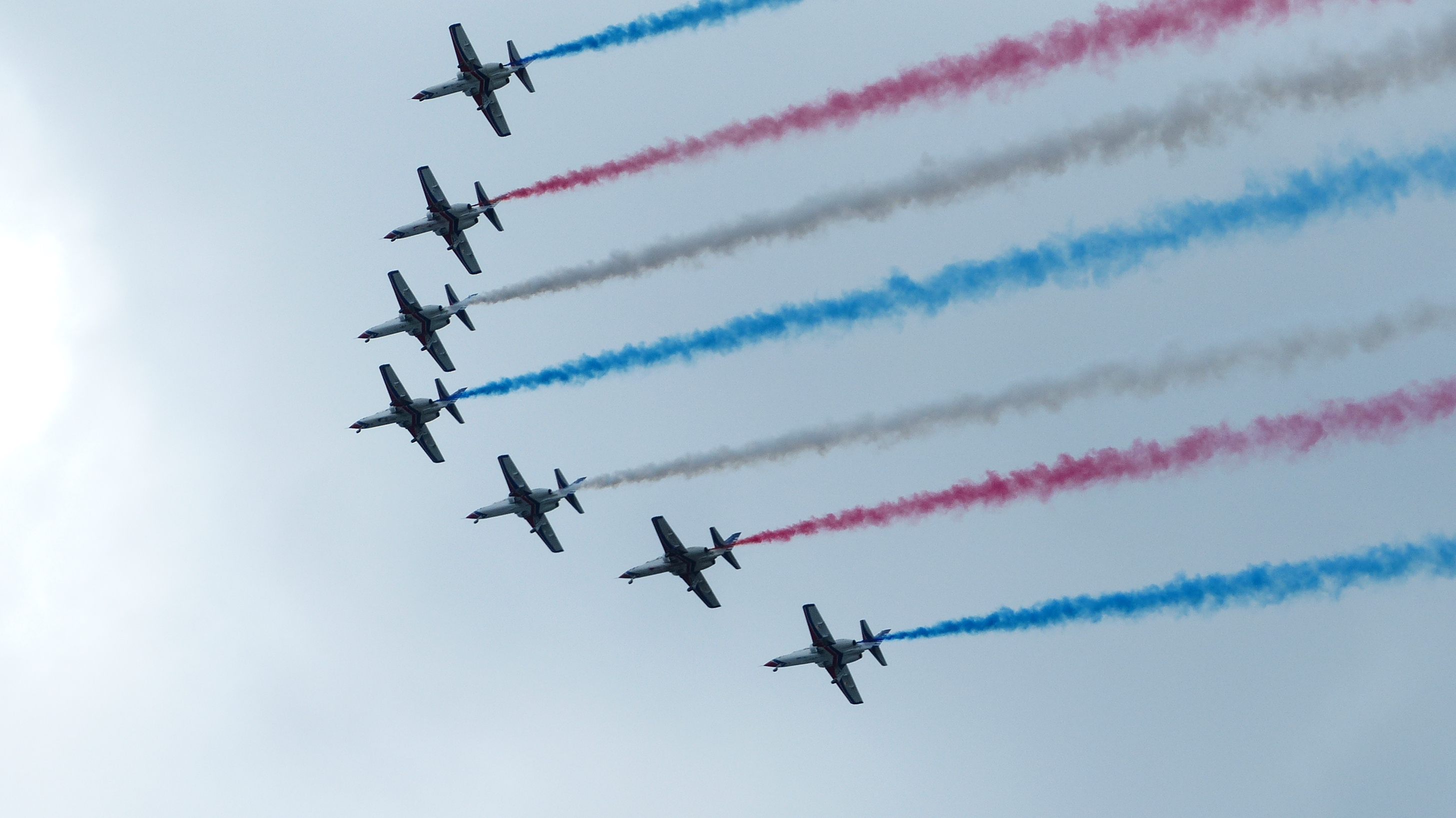
AT-3s of the Thunder Tigers demonstration team

Aerospace Industrial Development Corporation (AIDC; Chinese: 漢翔航空工業股份有限公司; pinyin: Hànxiáng Hángkōng Gōngyè Gǔfèn Yǒuxiàn Gōngsī 漢翔航空工業 or 漢翔航空) is a Taiwanese aerospace company based in Taichung. It is one of the largest defense companies in Taiwan, alongside National Chung-Shan Institute of Science and Technology.

== History ==
=== Government ownership ===
AIDC was established on 1 March 1969 as the Aero Industry Development Center of the Air Force. From 1969 to 1976 AIDC co-produced 118 UH-1H's for the Taiwanese Army with Bell Helicopters.

In 1983, AIDC was transferred to the Chungshan Institute of Science and Technology under the Armaments Bureau. In 1996, AIDC was reorganized into a government-owned company. In 1998 AIDC entered into an agreement with Sikorsky Aircraft to service the S-70 helicopter.

In 2000, AIDC was divided into four units: the Aerostructures Division, the Engine Division, the Technology Division, and the Administration Division. In the early 2000s AIDC was contracted by Bell to produce the tailbooms for the AH-1Z and UH-1Y.

=== Public ownership ===
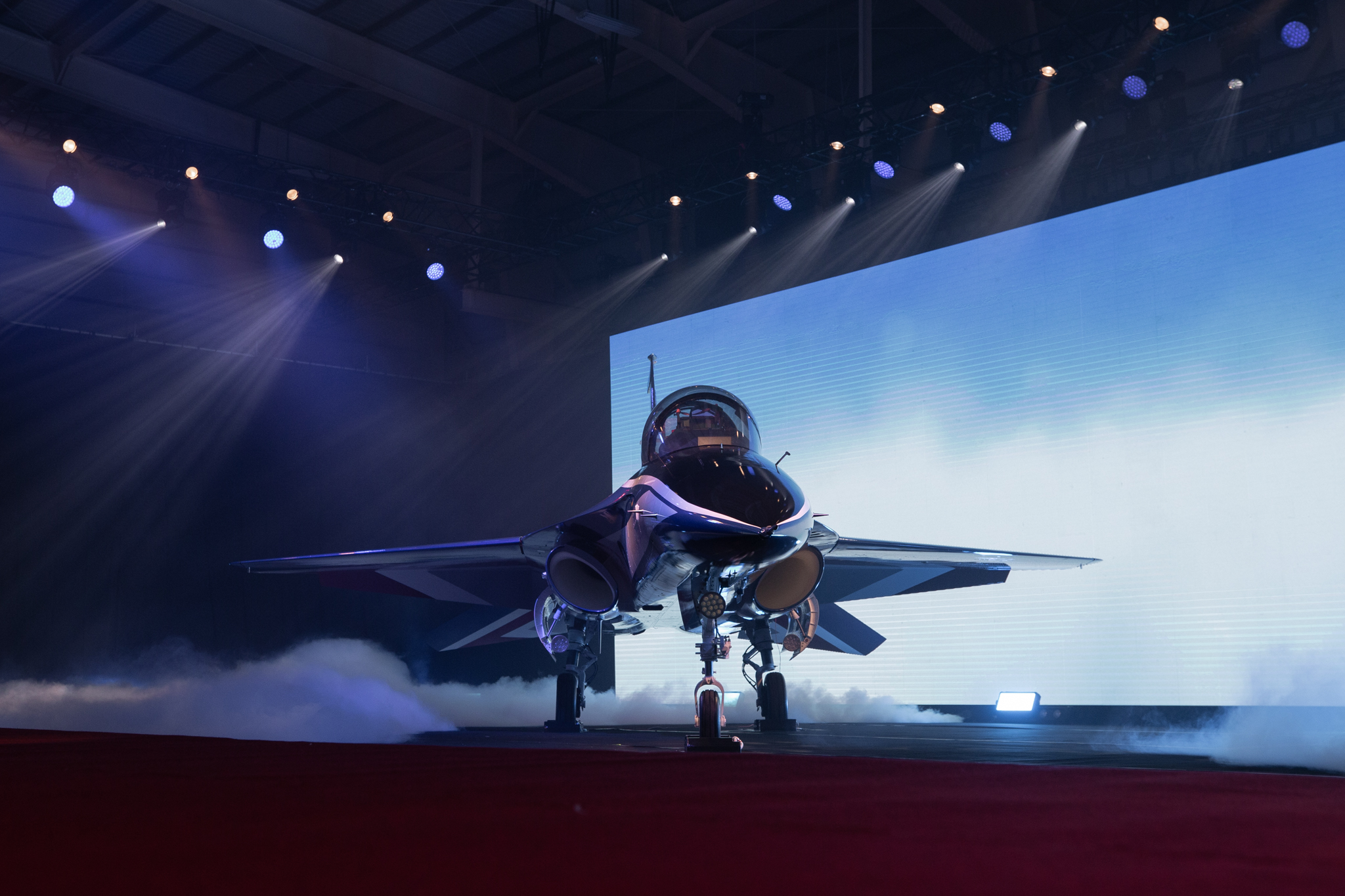
T-5 prototype at rollout

AIDC was privatized through a public stock offering on August 25, 2014, with the Taiwanese Government retaining a 39% stake.

In 2016 AIDC launched a project with international partner Lockheed Martin to develop an upgraded version of the F-16 called the F-16V. AIDC will share revenue from all future international sales and upgrades. Upgrades to 142 of Taiwan's F-16A/B fighters to the F-16V standard began in 2016. The first four aircraft upgrades had been completed by December 2017 and American test pilots had arrived to begin their testing and certification. The first domestically upgraded fighter was delivered on October 20, 2018. The project is to be completed by 2023. In October 2019 it was announced that the program had been delayed by a manpower shortage at AIDC and a delay with the US based software testing program, AIDC hired 200 additional employees in Taichung to bring production back to schedule. By December 2020 18 upgrades had been completed.

In 2018 AIDC signed an agreement with GE for the production of 17 parts for the LEAP engine including hot section components.

In 2019 AIDC entered into 10-year agreement to supply engine parts to Industria de Turbo Propulsores of Spain, a subsidiary of Rolls-Royce plc. In October 2019 Boeing cut orders to AIDC which were associated with the troubled 737 MAX program as monthly production figures were decreased. In 2019 AIDC was reported to have 2,137 employees involved in confidential projects.

In July 2025 China placed AIDC on an export control list due to its work for the Taiwanese military. Responding to the ban, AIDC said the ban would only affect its civilian product offerings and that it was seeking "appropriate alternative sources." Later in July AIDC announced that it would be cooperating with Japanese firms on building complete drone supply chains free of Chinese components.

== Facilities and equipment ==
In 2016 AIDC completed a NTD 1.5b composite materials manufacturing plant in Taichung. The facility, called the Taiwan Advanced Composite Center, has 5,500 square meters of floorspace and primarily produces components for the Airbus A320.

AIDC operates one Astra SPX aircraft as a target tug.

=== Headquarters ===
AIDC's headquarters occupies a large suburban campus in the Northwest of Taichung next to Overseas Chinese University. The campus features historical aircraft, a restaurant, and a swimming pool for the more than 3,000 onsite employees.

== Products ==
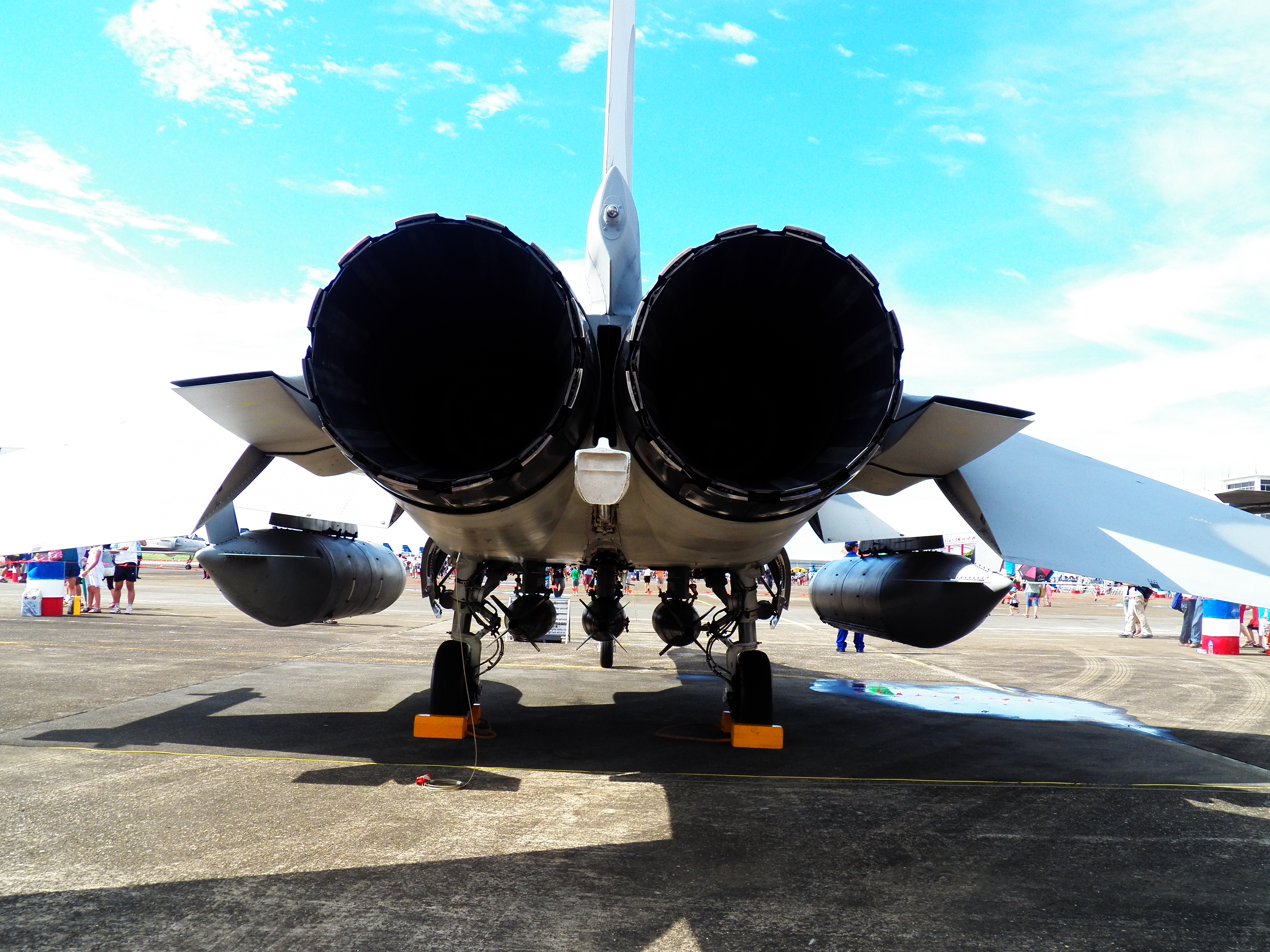
IDF F-CK-1A 1462 Outlet Nozzles and Underloaded Weapons

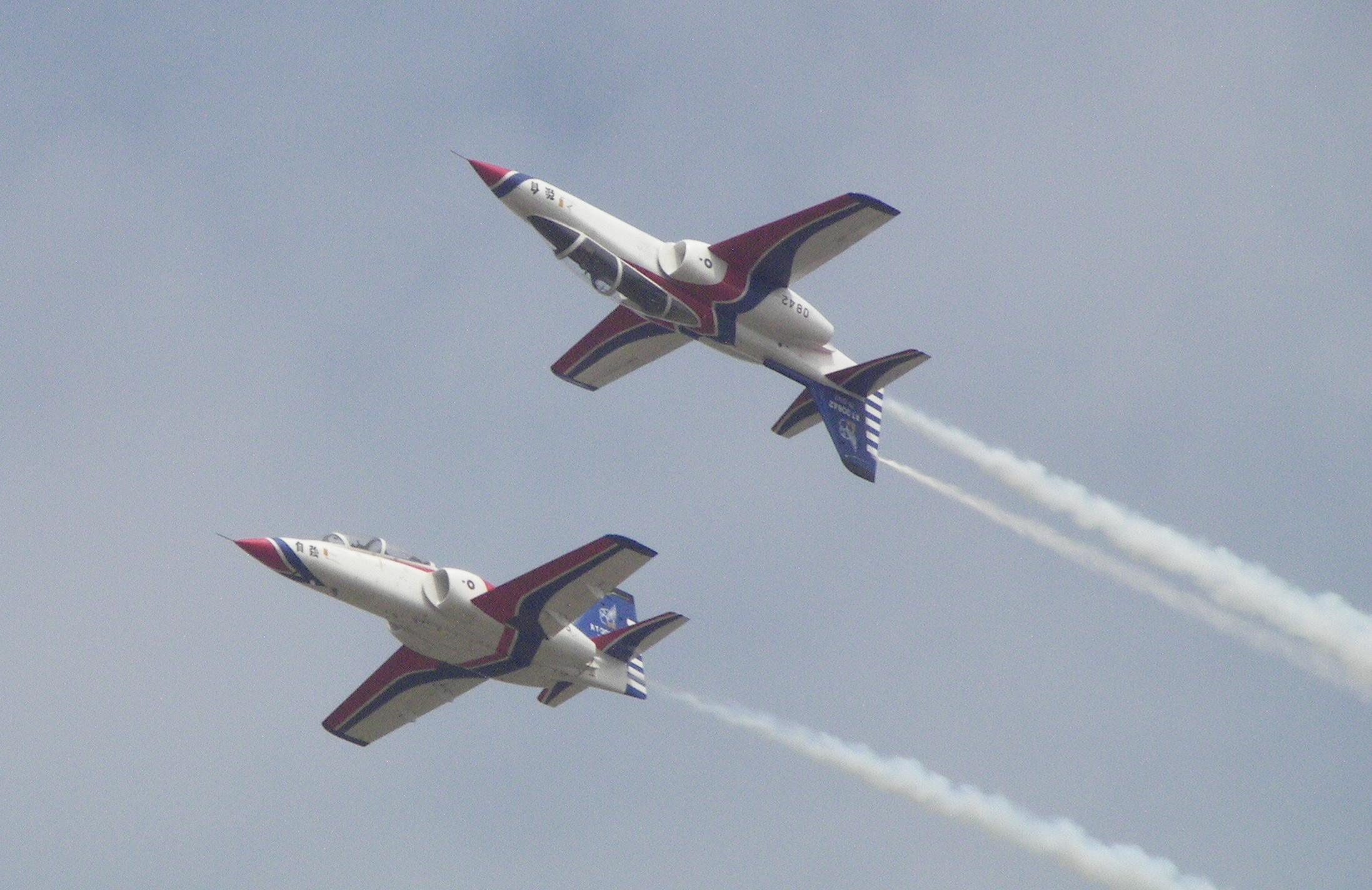
AIDC AT-3 - Thunder Tiger Aerobatics

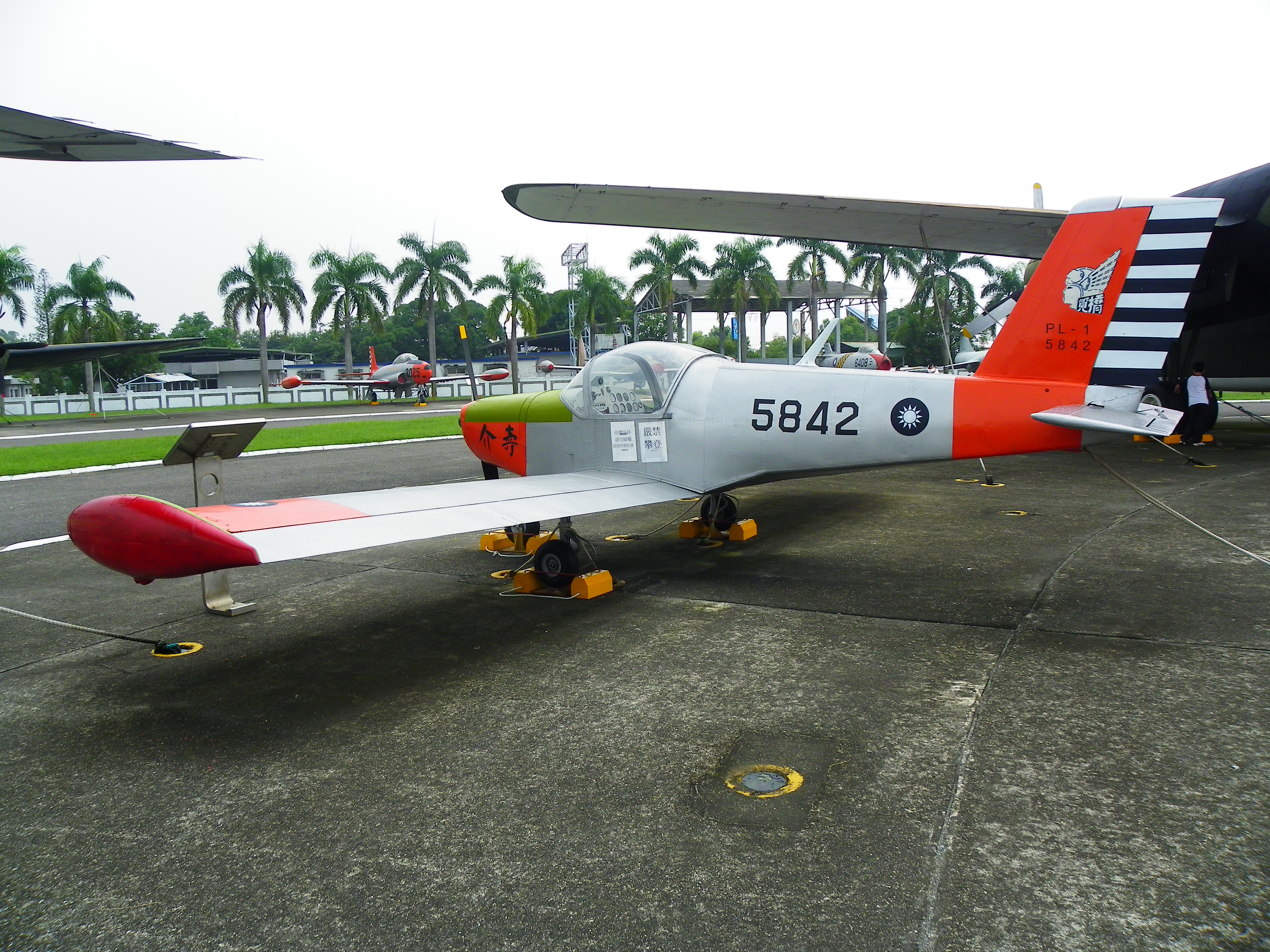
Republic of China Air Force PL-1B primary trainer

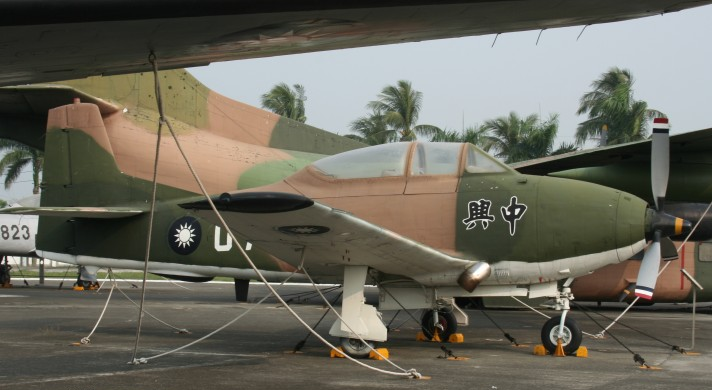
AIDC T-CH-1

=== Aircraft ===
- AIDC F-CK-1 Ching-kuo Indigenous Defence Fighter - began as XF-6 indigenous fighter project
- AIDC T-5 Brave Eagle (advanced jet trainer)
- AIDC AT-3 (advanced jet trainer)
  - variant XA-3 Lei Ming (single seat attack aircraft prototype)
- AIDC T-CH-1 (Basic Trainer derived from North American T-28 Trojan)
- AIDC PL-1B (Primary Trainer and licensed version of Pazmany PL-1, a two-seat trainer from Pazmany Aircraft Corporation)
- AIDC XC-2 (Civil transport, prototype only)
- UH-1H (utility helicopter and licensed version from Bell Helicopter)
- OH-58D (Observation, attack and reconnaissance helicopter and licensed version from Bell Helicopter)
- F-5E/F Chung Cheng (license built and locally modified Northrop F-5)

=== Components ===
- Doors for all Boeing 737 aircraft since 2003
- Cockpit for Sikorsky S-92
- Rear Fuselage, Engine Pylon and the Vertical and Horizontal Stabilizer for Challenger 300/350
- Composite belly panels for the Airbus A320 and Airbus A321
- Both designed and produces five composite components for the Mitsubishi MRJ
- Honeywell/ITEC F124 produced in partnership with Honeywell.
- Cooperation on the Rolls-Royce Pearl 700 Advance 2 engine

== See also ==
- List of aircraft manufacturers
- List of companies of Taiwan
- Taiwan Aerospace Industry Association
- Defense industry of Taiwan
- Israel Aerospace Industries
- Hindustan Aeronautics Limited
- Indonesian Aerospace
- Thai Aviation Industries
- Philippine Aerospace Development Corporation
