= AIDC XC-2 =

Prototype transport aircraft by the Aerospace Industrial Development Corporation

XC-2
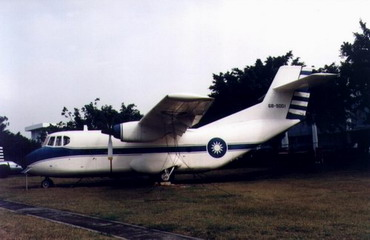
- Prototype AIDC XC-2 (68-5001) on display in Taichung (Shueinan)

General information
- Type: Civil transport
- National origin: Taiwan (Republic of China)
- Manufacturer: Aerospace Industrial Development Corporation
- Status: program cancelled
- Number built: 1

History
- First flight: 26 February 1979

The AIDC XC-2 was a prototype civil transport aircraft designed in the 1970s in Taiwan. It was a high-wing monoplane powered by two turboprop engines. The main undercarriage was carried in sponsons on either side of the boxy fuselage, maximising internal space.

A single prototype was built and was not selected for production.

== Specifications (performance estimated) ==
Data from Jane's All The World's Aircraft 1980-81

General characteristics

- Crew: 3 (pilot, co-pilot and flight engineer)
- Capacity: 38 passengers or 3,855 kg (8,500 lb) cargo
- Length: 20.10 m (65 ft 11 in)
- Wingspan: 24.90 m (81 ft 8 in)
- Height: 7.72 m (25 ft 4 in)
- Wing area: 65.40 m^{2} (704.0 sq ft)
- Aspect ratio: 9.5:1
- Airfoil: NACA 65_{3}-218
- Empty weight: 7,031 kg (15,501 lb)
- Max takeoff weight: 12,474 kg (27,500 lb)
- Fuel capacity: 3,028 L (666 imp gal; 800 US gal)
- Powerplant: 2 × Lycoming T53-L-701A turboprops, 1,082 kW (1,451 hp) each
- Propellers: 3-bladed Hamilton Standard 53C51-17 variable-pitch propellers, 3.05 m (10 ft 0 in) diameter

Performance

- Maximum speed: 392 km/h (244 mph, 212 kn) at sea level
- Cruise speed: 333 km/h (207 mph, 180 kn) at 3,050 m (10,000 ft) (econ. cruise)
- Stall speed: 145 km/h (90 mph, 78 kn) (flaps down)
- Never exceed speed: 463 km/h (288 mph, 250 kn)
- Range: 1,661 km (1,032 mi, 897 nmi) with maximum fuel
- Service ceiling: 8,015 m (26,296 ft)
- Rate of climb: 7.6 m/s (1,500 ft/min)
- Takeoff run to 15 m (50 ft): 778 m (2,552 ft)
- Landing run from 15 m (50 ft): 826 m (2,710 ft)

== See also ==
Aircraft of comparable role, configuration, and era

- Short SC.7 Skyvan
- Short 330
- Short 360
- de Havilland Canada DHC-6 Twin Otter
- Dornier 228
- GAF Nomad
- IAI Arava
- CASA C-212 Aviocar
- Antonov An-28
- PZL M28 Skytruck
- Antonov An-38
- Harbin Y-12
- Let L-410 Turbolet
