= List of equipment of the Vietnam People's Air Force =

This is a list of equipment of the Vietnam Air Defence - Air Force. During the Cold War, it received equipment from the Soviet Union. After the Vietnam War, it also used equipment captured from South Vietnam which had been supplied by the United States. Russia became a supplier after the Cold War.

== Aircraft ==
=== Combat Aircraft ===
Image	Model	Type	Variant	Quantity	Origin	Notes
	Sukhoi Su-22	Fighter-bomber	Su-22M4 Su-22UM3K	16 9	Soviet Union	The Soviets transferred 70 Su-22s (including Su-22M-3R reconnaissance and Su-22UM versions) to Vietnam from 1981 to 1984. According to the Vietnam Air Force Air Defense newspaper, the A32 factory overhauled 20 aircraft from 2019 to 2024.
	Sukhoi Su-27	Fighter	Su-27SK Su-27UBK	5 5	Russia	According to the Vietnam Air Force Air Defense newspaper, the A32 factory overhauled 5 aircraft from 2019 to 2024.
	Sukhoi Su-30	Multirole	Su-30MK2	35	Russia	According to the Vietnam Air Force Air Defense newspaper, the A32 factory overhauled 4 aircraft from 2019 to 2024.

=== Transport ===
Image	Model	Type	Variant	Quantity	Origin	Notes
	Antonov An-2	Transport		6	Soviet Union	
	CASA C-212	Transport	NC-212i	3	Indonesia	The aircraft are equipped with MSS 6000 radar.
	Airbus C295	Transport	C-295M	3	Spain	

=== Helicopter ===
Image	Model	Type	Variant	Quantity	Origin	Notes
	Mil Mi-8	Utility	Mi-8 Mi-8MT	16	Soviet Union	
	Mil Mi-17	Utility	Mi-17 Mi-17-1	6 8 (incl 4 SAR)	Russia	

=== Trainer ===
Image	Model	Type	Variant	Quantity	Origin	Notes
	Yakovlev Yak-130	Jet trainer Light multirole		10	Russia	One aircraft crashed in November 2024, another in January 2026.
	Aero L-39 Albatros	Jet trainer	L-39 L-39NG	17 12	Czechslovak SR Czech Republic	Flight International reported 43 aircraft in inventory, and three ordered, in 2025.
US-Vietnam T-6C Texan II	Beechcraft T-6 Texan II	Trainer aircraft	T-6C Texan II	12	United States	According to Vietnamese sources, all 12 orders have been delivered.
	Yakovlev Yak-52	Trainer aircraft		30	Soviet Union	According to the official Vietnamese press, the Yak-52 are still actively being used.

== Unmanned aerial vehicle ==
Image	Model	Type	Variant	Quantity	Origin	Notes
	M-96CT	Unmanned aerial vehicle	M-96CT M-96D		Vietnam	Used for air defence training.
	M-100CT	Unmanned aerial vehicle			Vietnam	Used for air defence training.

== Air Defense ==
The Military Balance of 2024 from the International Institute for Strategic Studies notes that Vietnam has a variety of towed anti-aircraft artillery in its arsenal, though the specific guns using the 85mm and 130mm calibers remain uncertain. It is possible that the 85mm gun is the KS-12/K-52, while the 130mm may be the KS-30. Vietnam has ~98+ SAM systems.

=== Surface-to-Air Defense ===
Image	Model	Type	Variant	Quantity	Origin	Notes
	S-300	Long range air defense and anti-ballistic missile system.	S-300PMU1	12 launchers	Russia	Two systems were acquired. Received upgrade to the command center and range of the missile. Said to be upgraded to S-300PMU2 standards. Factory A31 capable of domestically manufacturing spare and critical parts for SAM missile.
	SPYDER	Medium range air defense system	SPYDER-MR	5-10 (approx.) systems	Israel	Five received in 2016–2018.
	SA-2 Dvina	Short to medium range air defense system.	Volga S-75M/M3	~25 launchers	USSR	~27 to 35 km range. The Volga S-75M/M3 air defense missile complex (modern version of SAM-2) uses 5IA23 missiles and is a High-altitude air defense system. All SAM-2 complex systems have been modernized. Able to domestically produce complexes and equipment. Factory A31 capable of domestically manufacturing spare and critical parts for SAM missile. Old missiles had certain analog parts replaced with digital systems.
	S-125 Neva/Pechora	Short to medium range air defense system.	S-125TM Pechora-2TM S-125M Pechora-M S-125-VT	51 launchers	USSR; Vietnam (S-125-VT)	~35 km range. 30 S-125TM Pechora-2TM and 21 S-125M Pechora-M batteries as of 2024. The S-125-VT domestic modernized variant was reported to be in service in July 2024. Factory A31 capable of domestically manufacturing spare and critical parts for SAM missile. Old missiles had certain analog parts replaced with digital systems.
	9K35 Strela-10	Short range air defense system.		20 launchers	USSR	~10 km range. Still being used according to official Vietnamese newspaper from 2024, but not mentioned in the Military Balance of 2024.

=== Anti-aircraft Artillery ===
Image	Model	Type	Caliber	Variant	Quantity	Origin	Notes
	61-K	Autocannon	37 mm	Type 65		USSRChina; Vietnam (partial production)	37 mm automatic anti-air autocannon. Modernized with a fire-control system and radar.
	AZP S-60	Autocannon	57 mm			USSR; Vietnam (partial production)	57 mm automatic anti-air autocannon. The Vietnamese heavily upgraded the AZP S-60 by equipping it with a fire-control system with radar, optoelectronic reconnaissance equipment, an electromechanical gun control complex, and a digital firing element identification system connected to a computer. Has an LCD screen. The upgraded AZP S-60 can operate without a gunner, is fully automatic, and no longer needs to be manually reloaded. A part of the VPK-57 project. Fire-control system integrated with X-band AESA radar.
Stalin line - KS-19	KS-19	Towed Anti-aircraft gun	100 mm			USSR	Used during Vietnam war. Still in service according to Military Balance of 2024.

=== Self-propelled anti-aircraft ===
Image	Model	Type	Caliber	Variant	Quantity	Origin	Note
Upgraded ZSU-23-4 Shilka by PAVN	ZSU-23-4	Self-propelled anti-aircraft weapon				USSR	Upgrade locally with MANPADS installed on the turret, new electronics and fire control system

== Radar ==
Image	Model	Type	Variant	Quantity	Origin	Notes
	EL/M-2288	3D long-range air surveillance	EL/M-2288 ER	2	Israel	Delivered in 2013.
	Kasta 2E2	3D low-altitude air search		Russia	Acquired in the 2000s.	
	Kolchuga	Passive		4	Ukraine	4 bought in 2008 for $27 million per unit. Entered service by 2022.
	Nebo-SV	2D mid-range air surveillance		2	Russia	
	Nebo-U	3D long-range air surveillance	Nebo-UE	2	Russia	
	P-18	Acquisition	P18M		USSR	Variant developed in Vietnam using technology from the Czech Republic.
	RV-01				Belarus; Vietnam	Designed with assistance with Belarus abd Based on a design Belarus design. Designed with assistance with Belarus.
	RV-02	2D medium-range surveillance			Vietnam	Upgraded system based on the RV-01.
	VERA	Passive	VERA-NG	4	Czech Republic	Delivered from 2014 to 2016.
	VRS-2DM	Low-altitude			Vietnam	Based on the P-19 radar. Developed by Viettel.

== Munition ==
Image	Model	Type	Variant	Quantity	Origin	Notes
Air-to-air Missile
	K-13 (AA-2)	Air-to-air missile		2,550	USSR	Used by former MiG-21 and Su-22M4/UM3K. 1000 R-3S, 800 R-3R, and 750 R-13M missiles.
	R-60 (AA-8)	Air-to-air missile		400	USSR	Used by Su-22M4/UM3K fighter-bombers.
	R-27 (AA-10)	Air-to-air missile		320	Russia Ukraine	Used by Su-30MK2 and Su-27SK/UBK fighters.
	R-73 (AA-11)	Air-to-air missile	R-73E	375	Russia	Used by Su-30MK2, Su-27SK/UBK and Yak-130. Short range missile.
	R-77 (AA-12)	Air-to-air missile	RVV-AE		Russia	RVV-AE is carried by Vietnamese Su-30MK2.
Air-to-surface Missile
	Kh-59 (AS-13)	Air-to-surface missile		200	Russia	Kh-59 is carried by Vietnamese Su-30MK2.
	Kh-29 (AS-14)	Air-to-surface missile		100	Russia	Used by Su-30MK2, Su-27SK/UBK and Su-22M4/UM3K fighter-bombers
	Kh-31 (AS-17)	Air-to-surface missile	Kh-31A Kh-31P	100	Russia	Kh-31 is carried by Vietnamese Su-30MK2.
Rocket
	S-5 rocket	Rocket			USSR	
	S-8 rocket	Rocket			USSR	
Bomb
	KAB-500KR	Electro-optical TV-guided fire and forget bomb		200	Russia	
Корректируемая_авиационная_бомба_КАБ–1500ЛГ-Ф-Э_с_фугасной_боевой_частью_-_МАКС-2009_01	KAB-1500L	Laser-guided bomb		200	Russia	
	OFAB-100-120	Aerial bomb			Soviet Union	
	OFAB-250-270	Aerial bomb			Soviet Union	
	P-100P Bomb	Training bomb		500	Indonesia	The type purchased is the P-100P practice variant used on Su-30.

== Former ==
=== Combat Aircraft ===
Image	Model	Type	Variant	Quantity	Origin	Notes
	Shenyang J-6	Fighter		30	China	10 units per year delivered in 1970, 1971, and 1972.
	Shenyang J-5	Fighter		10	China	The Vietnamese Air Force used J-5s alongside the Soviet supplied MiG-17s for interception missions until the 1990s when they were retired, along with the remaining MiG-19s, being replaced with newer MiG-21s and Su-27s.
	MiG-21 Fishbed	Fighter	MiG-21F-13 MiG-21PF MiG-21PFM MiG-21bis MiG-21MF MiG-21U MiG-21US MiG-21UM	296 (approx.)	Soviet Union	Delivered from 1966 to 1996; most second-hand. Retired by 2017.
	MiG-19 Farmer	Fighter		30	Soviet Union	15 delivered in 1967; another 15 in 1973.
	MiG-17 Fresco	Fighter	MiG17A MiG17P MiG17PF	367	Soviet Union	
	MiG-15 Fagot	Fighter Trainer		3	Soviet Union	
	Northrop F-5	Light ground-attack Light fighter	F-5A F-5E	? (possibly 41 in 935th Fighter Regiment)	United States	114 possibly captured after Vietnam War, post 1975.
	Cessna A-37 Dragonfly	Light ground-attack	A-37A A-37B	? (likely in the 1970s and 80s)	United States	95 possibly captured after Vietnam War, post 1975.

=== Bomber ===
Image	Model	Type	Variant	Quantity	Origin	Notes
Berlin Gatow Luftwaffenmuseum Ilyushin Il-28 02	Ilyushin Il-28	Medium bomber	Ilyushin Il-28 Ilyushin Il-28U Ilyushin Il-28R	8	Poland	Inactive.

=== Maritime patrol ===
Image	Model	Type	Variant	Quantity	Origin	Notes
	PZL M28	Maritime patrol	M28B-1R	2	Poland	Inactive.

=== Transport ===
Image	Model	Type	Variant	Quantity	Origin	Notes
282 AN-26	Antonov An-26	Transport		~50	Soviet Union	
	Antonov An-24	Transport		7	Soviet Union	
	Beriev Be-12	Transport		6	Soviet Union	
	Lockheed C-130 Hercules	Transport		7	United States	Captured during Vietnam War. Still serviced after 1975 and retired after 1980
	Fairchild C-119	Transport		4	United States	Captured during Vietnam War.
	de Havilland Canada C-7 Caribou	STOLtransport aircraft	C-7A		United States	Captured during Vietnam War.
	Douglas C-47 Skytrain	Military transport aircraft			United States	Captured during Vietnam War.
	Cessna 185 Skywagon	Military transport aircraft	U-17A		United States	Captured during Vietnam War.
	de Havilland Canada DHC-2 Beaver	Military transport aircraft	U-6A		United States	Captured during Vietnam War.

=== Helicopters ===
Image	Model	Type	Variant	Quantity	Origin	Notes
Mi-24A	Mil Mi-24	Attack helicopter	Mi-24A Mi-24D	~10 ~30	Soviet Union	Deployed during the Cambodian–Vietnamese War with rocket launchers from captured American U-17 reconnaissance aircraft.
Mi-24A	Mi-4	Transport		~10	Soviet Union	
	Mi-6 Hook	Transport	Mil Mi-6	~15-26	Soviet Union	They were actively used during the Vietnam War to move aircraft at forward airstrips and also took part in delivering supplies along the Ho Chi Minh Trail.
	CH-47 Chinook	Transport	CH-47A	5	United States	Captured during Vietnam War.
	UH-1 Iroquois	Utility	UH-1H	44	United States	Captured during Vietnam War.

=== Trainer ===
Image	Model	Type	Variant	Quantity	Origin	Notes
	Aero L-29	Trainer			Czechoslovakia	
	TL-1	Trainer			Vietnam	Designed and manufactured from 1984 - 1985. The TL-1 is said to be a 4 seater with side-by-side seating arrangement. The HL-1 is a 2 seater with tandem seating. The HL-2 is either a 2nd iteration of HL-1 or a new variation. Also, seen at the Vietnam People's Air Force Museum in Hanoi.

=== Unmanned Aerial Vehicle (UAV) ===
Image	Model	Type	Variant	Quantity	Origin	Notes
Small UVA
	ITAD M-400	Reconnaissance			Vietnam	No longer in service. Designed in 2001 and produced in 2005. Produced and developed by Viettel.

=== Air Defense ===
==== Anti-aircraft Artillery ====
Image	Model	Type	Caliber	Variant	Origin	Notes
	ZU-23-2	Twin Autocannon	23 mm	23mm-2M 23mm-2ML	USSR Israel; Vietnam	The 23mm-2M variant upgrade included cabin for gunner, electromechanic turn system, modern control systems, and potentially a ballistic computer and fire-control system. This project was jointly carried out by Israel and Vietnam. Similar to the 23mm-2M, the 23mm-2ML additionally includes optronics sensor, laser rangefinder, and potentially a digital fire-control system Further modernization projects includes installing the platform on logistic trucks and adding an automatic control system that's being developed. Potentially retired according to the Military Balance of 2024. Likely transferred to the army.

=== Missile ===
Image	Model	Type	Variant	Quantity	Origin	Notes
Air-to-surface Missile
	Kh-28 (AS-9)	Anti-radiation missile	Kh-28E	100	Soviet Union	Used by Su-22M4/UM3K fighter-bombers.
	Kh-25 (AS-10)	Air-to-surface missile Anti-radiation missile	Kh-25ML Kh-25TE Kh-25MR Kh-25MP	400	Russia	

=== Radar System ===
Image	Model	Type	Variant	Quantity	Origin	Notes
2D Radar
P 18-2	P-18 radar	2D Very-high Frequency Radar			Soviet Union	May have been retired and replace by P18M radar.
P 18-2	P-15 radar	2D Ultra-high Frequency Radar		+1	Soviet Union	It has been retired and replace by more powerful radars.
P 18-2	P-35 radar	2D Medium-Long-range E/F-Band Radar			Soviet Union	It has been retired and replace by more powerful radars.
P 18-2	P-14 radar	2D Very-high Frequency Radar			Soviet Union	It has been retired and replace by more powerful radars.
P 18-2	P-12 radar	2D Very-high Frequency Radar			Soviet Union	It has been retired and replace by more powerful radars.

== Development ==
This includes weapons that are in the planning, development, or testing phase. Not all the weapons in this section will progress to the point of being procured. To avoid confusion, existing weapon systems that are being modified or upgraded should have their progress recorded in the notes section and not moved to the development section.

Development completed
Development ongoing
Development cancelled

=== Unmanned Aerial Vehicle (UAV) ===
Image	Model	Type	Variant	Quantity	Origin	Notes
MALE UVA
	HS-6L	MALE UAV			Belarus; Vietnam	Jointly developed by Vietnam's Academy of Science and Technology with Belarus; completed in 2015 around November. Specs: Range: 4,000 km (claimed); Endurance: 35 hours; Wingspan: 22 m
	UAV2-20	MALE UAV			Vietnam	Resembles MQ-9 Reaper drone. Certain parts painted in red.
	VU-MALE	MALE UAV	U3		Vietnam	Multi-purpose UAV. Specs: Range: 1,000 km; Endurance: 12 hours; Operational features: Carry long range weaponry, high-precision weapons, and reconnaissance equipment

=== Munition ===
Image	Model	Type	Variant	Quantity	Origin	Notes
	BT-100-120	Practice Aerial Bomb			Vietnam	Researched and manufactured by Vietnam's Military Science and Technology Institute. Project took 2 years to complete. Stated to be 100% domestically manufactured along with the technology and material used. Low cost and able to be produced in large batches.

== Procurement ==
Procurement completed
Procurement ongoing
Procurement cancelled

=== Aircraft ===
Image	Model	Type	Variant	Quantity	Origin	Notes
	Yakovlev Yak-130	Jet trainer Light multirole	Yak-130M	18	Russia	Irkutsk Aviation Plant chief disclosed during President Vladimir Putin visit

==== Transport ====
Image	Model	Type	Variant	Quantity	Origin	Notes
	C-130J	Transport		3	United States	US have agreed in 2024 to supply 3 aircraft.

== Sources ==
- Viettel High Tech (2023). Viettel High Tech Profile 2023 (PDF). Viettel.
- International Institute for Strategic Studies (2018). The Military Balance 2018. London: Routledge. ISBN 978-1-857-43955-7.
- International Institute for Strategic Studies (2025). The Military Balance 2025. London: Routledge. ISBN 978-1-041-04967-8.
- Flight International (21 November 2024). "2025 World Air Forces directory". FlightGlobal.
- Shephard Media (2022). Radar and Electronic Warfare Systems Handbook (PDF). The Shephard Press Ltd.
- Toperczer, István (2001). MiG-17 And MiG-19 Units of the Vietnam War (Osprey Combat Aircraft #25). Oxford, UK: Osprey Publishing. ISBN 978-1841761626.
- Wragg, David (23 February 2011). The World Air Power Guide. Casemate Publishers. ISBN 978-1-84468-784-8.
