= List of military aircraft of the Czech Republic =

The following list of military aircraft of the Czech Republic is a list of military aircraft and civil aircraft for military use currently in service with the Czech Air Force, the Czech Land Forces (unmanned aerial vehicles) and the Flight Training Center as well as retired aircraft.

== Current aircraft ==
=== Czech Air Force ===
Type	Origin	Class	Role	Introduced	In service	Total	Notes
Aero L-159A ALCA	Czech Republic	Jet	Attack	2000	16	72	
Aero L-159T1	Czech Republic	Jet	Trainer	2007	5	5	
Aero L-159T2	Czech Republic	Jet	Trainer	2019	3	3	
Airbus A319CJ	Germany	Jet	Transport	2006	2	2	
CASA C-295M	Spain	Propeller	Transport	2010	6	6	
Embraer C-390 Millennium	Brazil	Jet	Transport	2026	1	2	
Let L-410 Turbolet	Czechoslovakia	Propeller	Transport	1989	4	6	
Let L-410FG	Czechoslovakia	Propeller	Patrol	1985	2	2	
Mil Mi-24 V/Mi-35	USSR/Russia	Rotorcraft	attack	2004	?	17	Donated to Ukraine in 2022-2024
Mil Mi-8	USSR	Rotorcraft	Transport	1984	1	18	
Mil Mi-17	USSR	Rotorcraft	Transport	1989	5	28	
Mil Mi-171Sh	Russia	Rotorcraft	Transport	2004	15	16	
PZL W-3 Sokół	Poland	Rotorcraft	Utility	1995	10	11	
Bell UH-1Y Venom	USA	Rotorcraft	Utility	2023	6	10	
Bell AH-1Z Viper	USA	Rotorcraft	Attack	2023	4	10	
Saab JAS 39 Gripen	Sweden	Jet	Multi-role	2005	14	14	

=== Flight Training Center ===
Flight Training Center (Czech: Centrum leteckého výcviku; CLV) in Pardubice is not a part of the Air Force. Primary flight training was outsourced as of 1 April 2004. CLV is a branch of LOM PRAHA s.p., state owned company.

Type	Origin	Class	Role	Introduced	In service	Total	Notes
Aero L-39 Skyfox	Czech Republic	Jet	Trainer	2025	2		
Aero L-39C Albatros	Czechoslovakia	Jet	Trainer	1972	7		
Evektor-Aerotechnik EV-97	Czech Republic	Propeller	Trainer		1		
Let L-410 Turbolet	Czechoslovakia	Propeller	Transport		1	2	
L 410 NG	Czechia	Propeller	Transport		0/1		
Mil Mi-17	USSR	Rotorcraft	Transport	1985	3	7	
Enstrom 480B	USA	Rotorcraft	Trainer	2018	9		
Zlín Z-43	Czech Republic	Propeller	Trainer		1		
Zlín Z-142	Czech Republic	Propeller	Trainer	1992	9		

=== Czech Land Forces ===
Unmanned aerial vehicles of the Czech Army are used mainly by the Unmanned Reconnaissance Aerial Vehicle Company of the 102nd Reconnaissance Battalion with one "Scan Eagle Group" and four "RQ-11B Raven Sections" ready for deployment (as of 2017).

Type	Origin	Class	Role	Introduced	In service	Total	Notes
Elbit Skylark	Israel	UAV	Reconnaissance	2009	2		Acquired for overseas deployment.
RQ-11B Raven	United States	UAV	Reconnaissance		6		
Scan Eagle	United States	UAV	Reconnaissance		10		
Wasp III	United States	UAV	Reconnaissance	2010			Acquired for ISTAR and FAC units.
RQ-20 Puma	United States	UAV	Reconnaissance	2008			One system RQ-20A Puma was purchased in 2018. In 2022 was purchased four systems Puma 3 AE.

== Retired aircraft ==
=== Czech Air Force ===
Type	Origin	Class	Role	Introduced	Retired	Total	Notes
Antonov An-12BP	USSR	Propeller	Transport	1981	1994	1	Introduced in 1964 in USSR.
Antonov An-26	USSR	Propeller	Transport	1982	2011	4	
Tupolev Tu-134A	USSR	Jet	Transport	1971	1996	1	
Tupolev Tu-154M	USSR	Jet	Transport	1998	2007	2	
Aero L-29 Delfin	Czechoslovakia	Jet	Trainer	1963	2003	32	
Antonov An-30	USSR	Propeller	Patrol	1988	2003	1	
Mil Mi-2	USSR	Rotorcraft	Utility	1981	2004	38	
Mil Mi-24D	Russia	Rotorcraft	Attack	1978	2022	12	4 Donated to Ukraine in 2022
MiG-21MF	USSR	Jet	Fighter	1971	2005	72	
MiG-21UM	USSR	Jet	Fighter/Trainer	1972	2005	22	
MiG-23BN	USSR	Jet	Fighter-bomber	1977	1994	32	
MiG-23MF	USSR	Jet	Fighter	1978	1994	13	
MiG-23ML	USSR	Jet	Fighter	1981	1998	17	
MiG-23UM	USSR	Jet	Fighter/Trainer	1978	1998	8	
MiG-29A	USSR	Jet	Fighter	1989	1995	9	
MiG-29UB	USSR	Jet	Fighter/Trainer	1989	1995	1	
Sukhoi Su-22	USSR	Jet	Fighter-bomber	1984	2002	37	56 as of 1990; Slovakia received 19 in 1993.
Sukhoi Su-25	USSR	Jet	Attack	1984	2000	25	
Yak-40	USSR	Jet	Transport	1972	2020	2	museum exponats
Bombardier Challenger CL-601	Canada	Jet	Transport	1992	2021	1	
Aero L-39ZA Albatros	Czechoslovakia	Jet	Trainer	1989	2019	9	
Antonov An-24V	USSR	Propeller	Transport	1967	2005	4	

=== Czech Land Forces ===
Type	Origin	Class	Role	Introduced	Retired	Total	Notes
Sojka III	Czech Republic	UAV	Reconnaissance	1999	2011		
Tu-143	USSR	UAV	Reconnaissance	1985	1995		

== See also ==
- Military of the Czech Republic
