= Flight Training Center Pardubice =

Czech provider of flight training

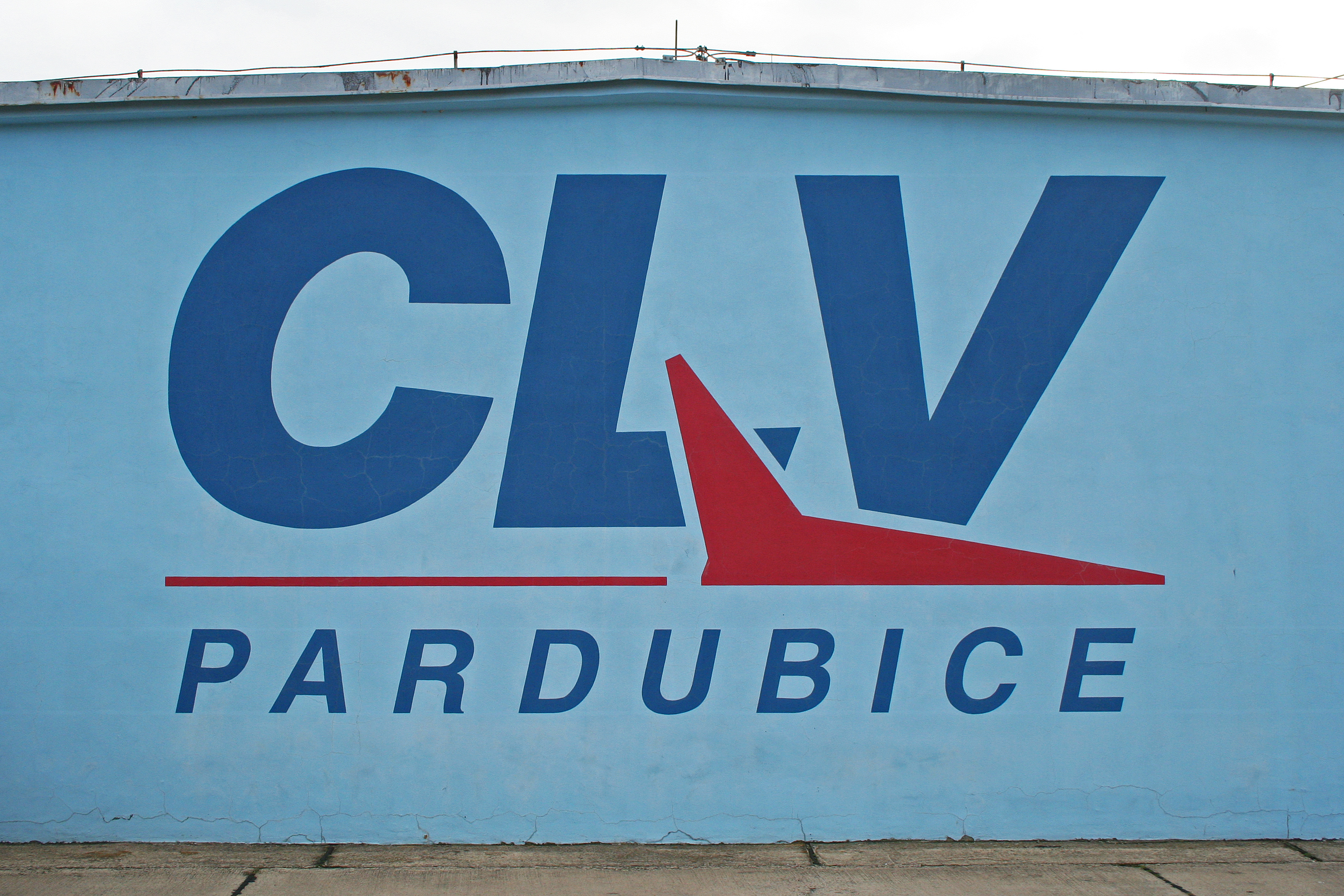
- Type: State-owned
- Industry: Defence contracting
- Predecessor: 34th Special Air Base
- Founded: 1 April 2004; 22 years ago
- Headquarters: Pardubice, Czech Republic
- Key people: Jaroslav Špaček (director)
- Services: Flight training
- Parent: LOM Praha
- Website: lompraha.cz

Flight Training Center (Czech: Centrum leteckého výcviku, CLV) is a Czech provider of military training programs for both fixed-wing and rotary-wing aircraft based at Pardubice Airport. CLV is a division of the state-owned enterprise LOM Praha whose common stock is 100% owned by the Ministry of Defence of the Czech Republic.

Since April 2004, Flight Training Center Pardubice has been providing complete training for pilots of the Czech Air Force but it also offers its services to foreign customers. Courses are taught and supervised by retired military pilots, such as former JAS 39 Gripen and Red Bull Air Race pilot Martin Šonka.

== History ==
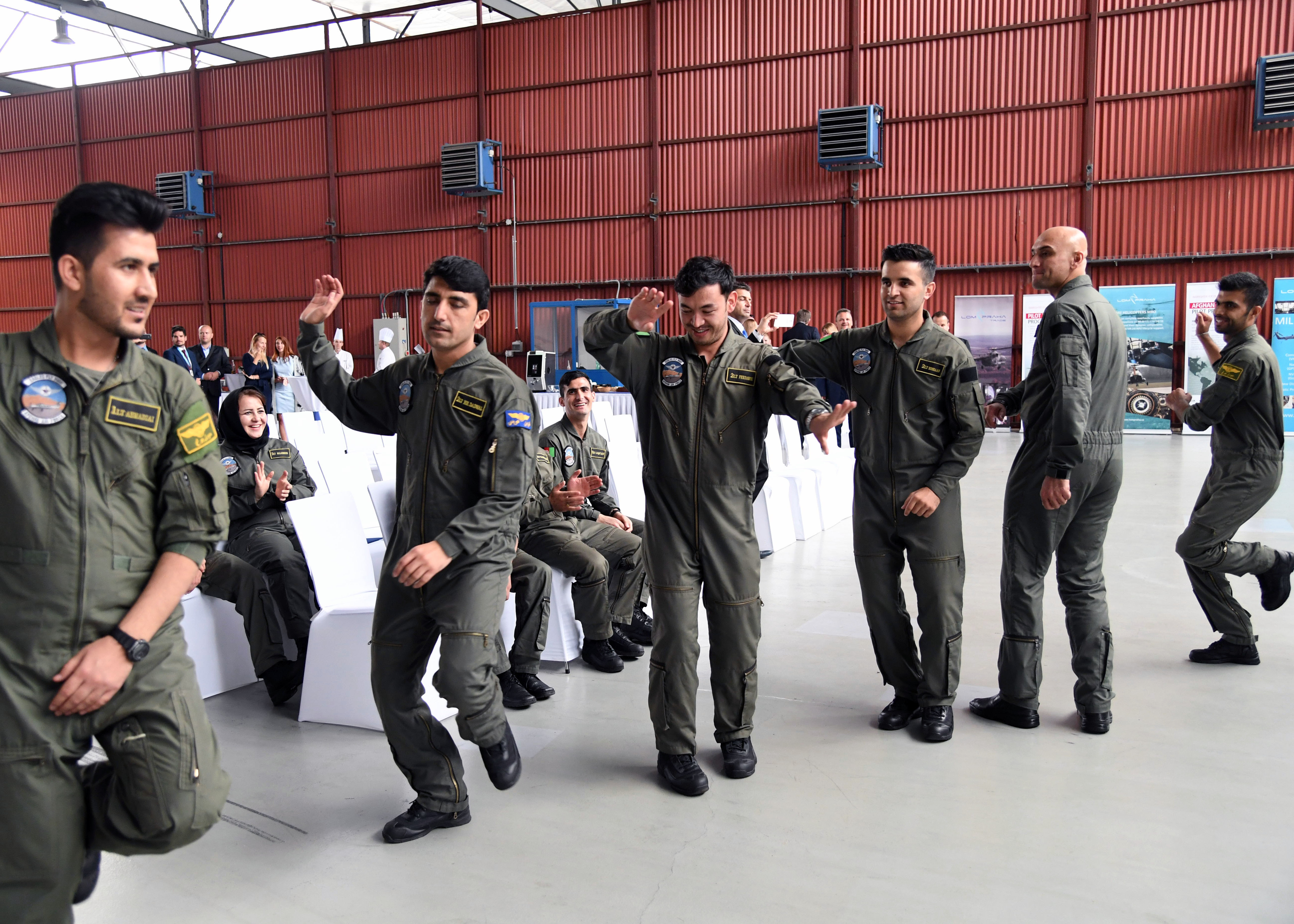
22 Afghan Air Force pilots including two women graduated from the Flight Training Center on 27 June 2018

In 2000, the 34th Training Air Base based at Pardubice Airport was renamed as 34th Special Air Base. On 1 April 2004, the military base was transformed into civilian Flight Training Center.

On 2 December 2021, the Flight Training Center (CLV) and the International Flight Training School (IFTS) were selected as the initial two NATO Flight Training Europe (NFTE) Training Campuses.

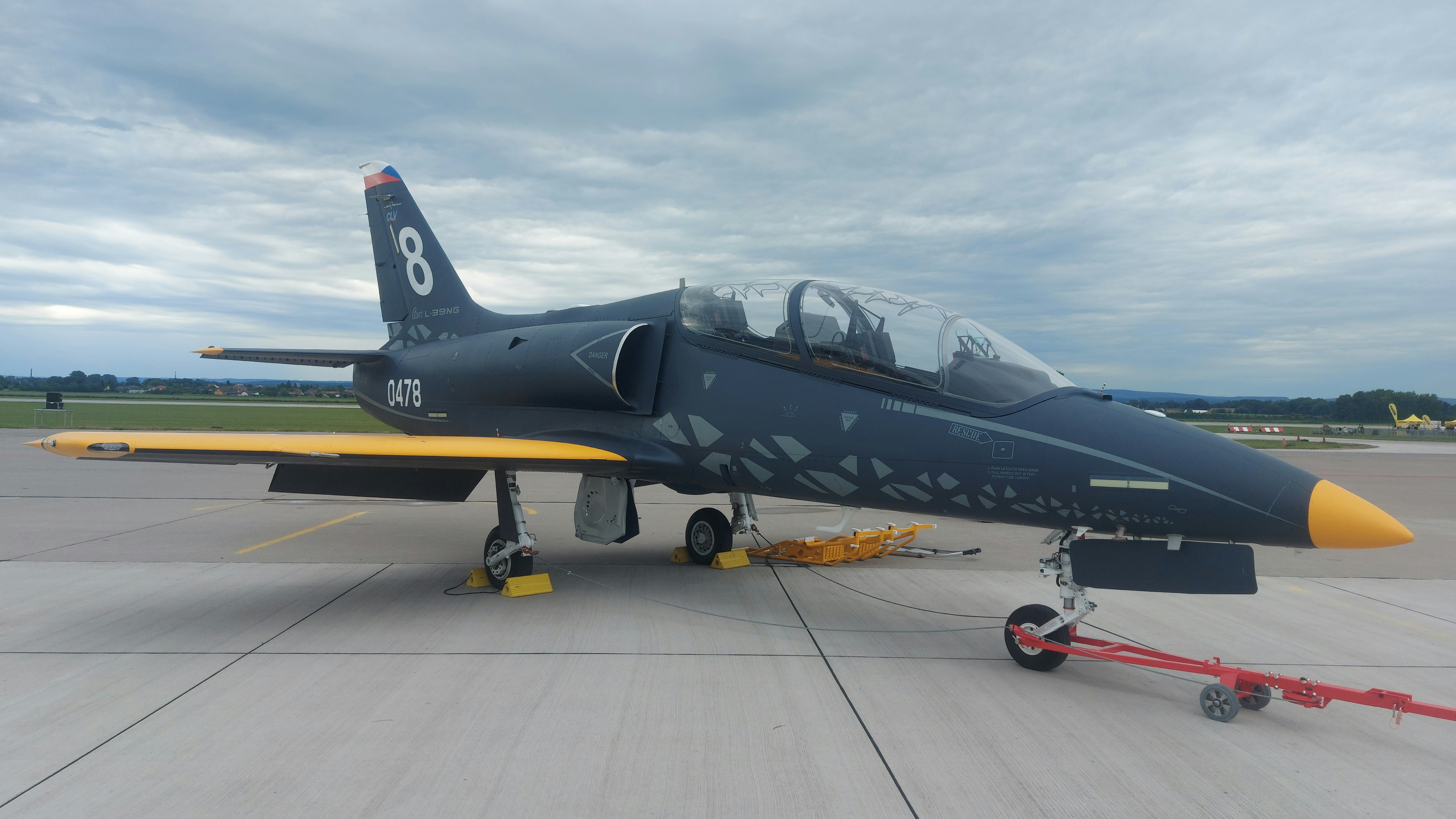
Aero L-39NG Skyfox aircraft operated by CLV Pardubice

In May 2024, LOM Praha and Lockheed Martin signed a cooperation agreement, which includes plans to establish a European F-35 Lightning II training center within the CLV facility in Pardubice. The training will be focusing on Czech Air Force F-35 pilots but accommodating foreign aviators in a 75-25 ratio. Lockheed Martin approved Zlín Z-142 and Aero L-39 Skyfox as suitable platforms for F-35 training.

== Aircraft ==
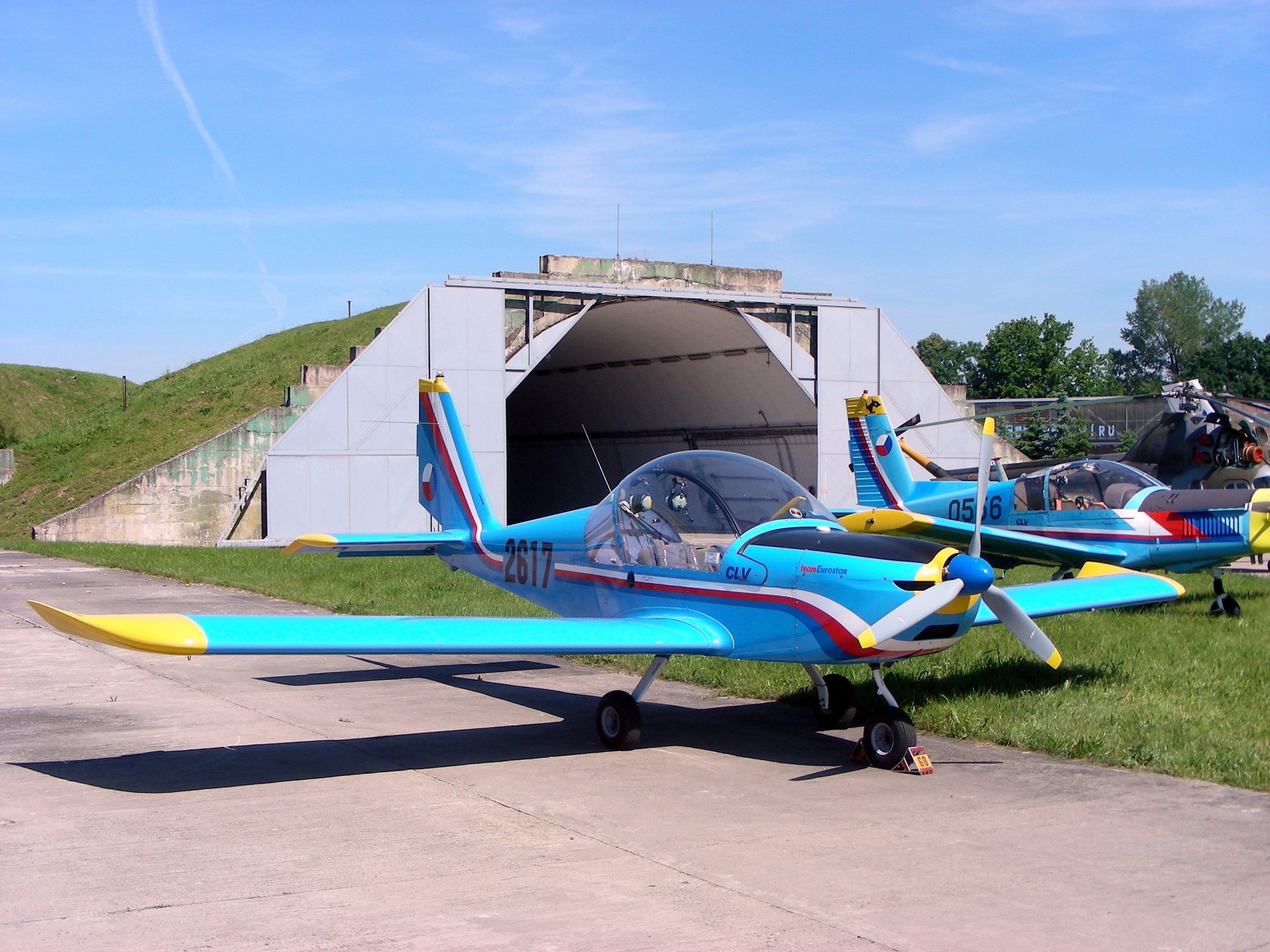
An EV-97, Z-142, and Mi-2 on display in front of hardened aircraft shelter.

CLV aircraft used for the training of military pilots are registered in the military aviation register administered by the Department of Military Aviation Authority of the Czech Ministry of Defence. One Z-142 and one Z-43 intended for additional civil training are registered in the Civil Aviation Register kept by the Civil Aviation Authority as OK-PNE and OK-WOI respectively.

=== Ordered ===
| Aircraft | Origin | Type | Variant | Number | Notes |
|---|---|---|---|---|---|
| Aero L-39 Skyfox | Czech Republic | jet trainer & light combat aircraft | L-39NG | 2 | |
| Zlin Z-143 | Czech Republic | trainer | Z-143 LSi | 2 | |
| Zlin 242 | Czech Republic | trainer | Z-242 L | 6 | |

=== Current inventory ===
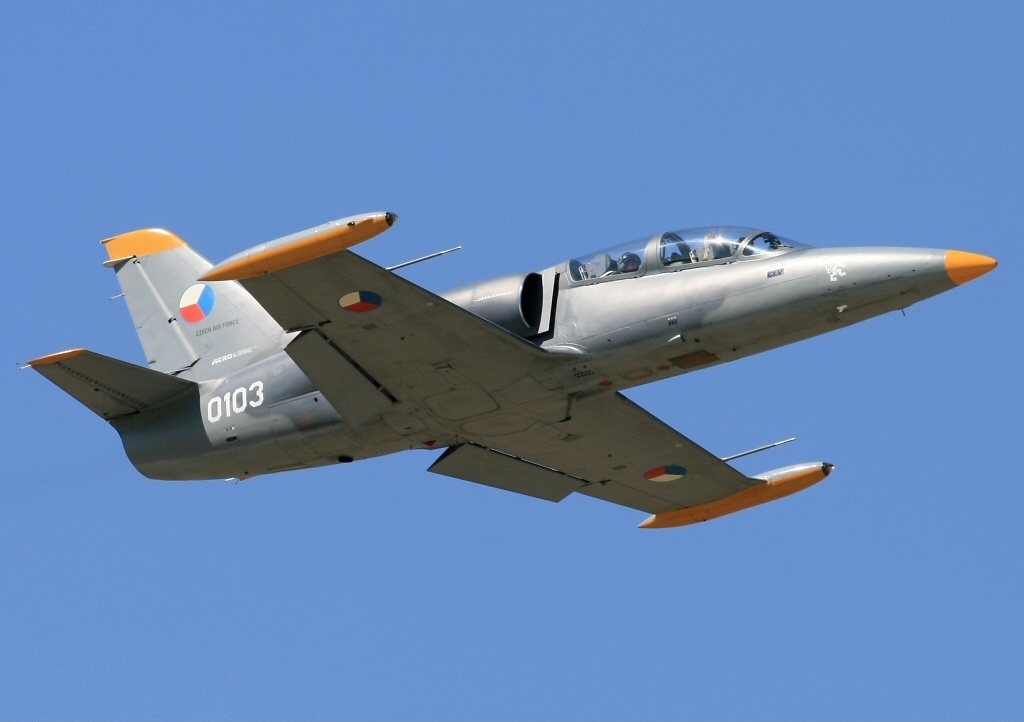
Aero L-39C aircraft operated by CLV Pardubice

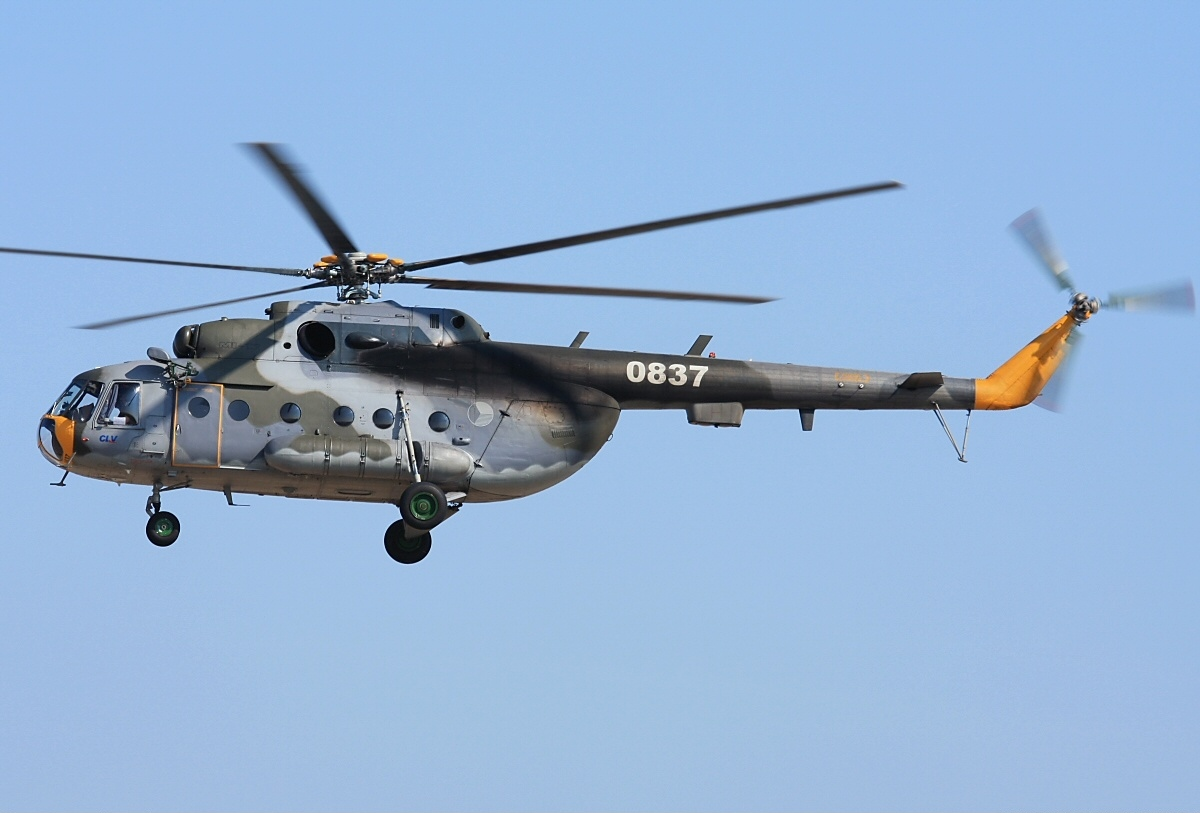
Mi-17 helicopter

| Aircraft | Origin | Type | Variant | In service | Notes |
Trainer aircraft
| Aero L-39 Skyfox | Czech Republic | jet trainer & light combat aircraft | L-39NG.T1 | 6 | |
| Zlín Z-142 | Czech Republic | trainer aircraft | | 9 | 8 Z-142C AF, 1 Z-142 |
| Zlín Z-43 | Czech Republic | trainer aircraft | | 1 | |
| Evektor SportStar | Czech Republic | trainer aircraft | EV-97 | 1 | |
Transport
| Let L-410 | Czech Republic | utility | L-410UVP-T | 1 | |
Helicopters
| Mil Mi-17 | Soviet Union | utility | | 3 | 7 in total |
| Enstrom 480 | United States | utility | | 9 | 8 480B-G, 1 480B |

== See also ==
- List of military aircraft of the Czech Republic
