= Light combat aircraft =

Light multirole military aircraft

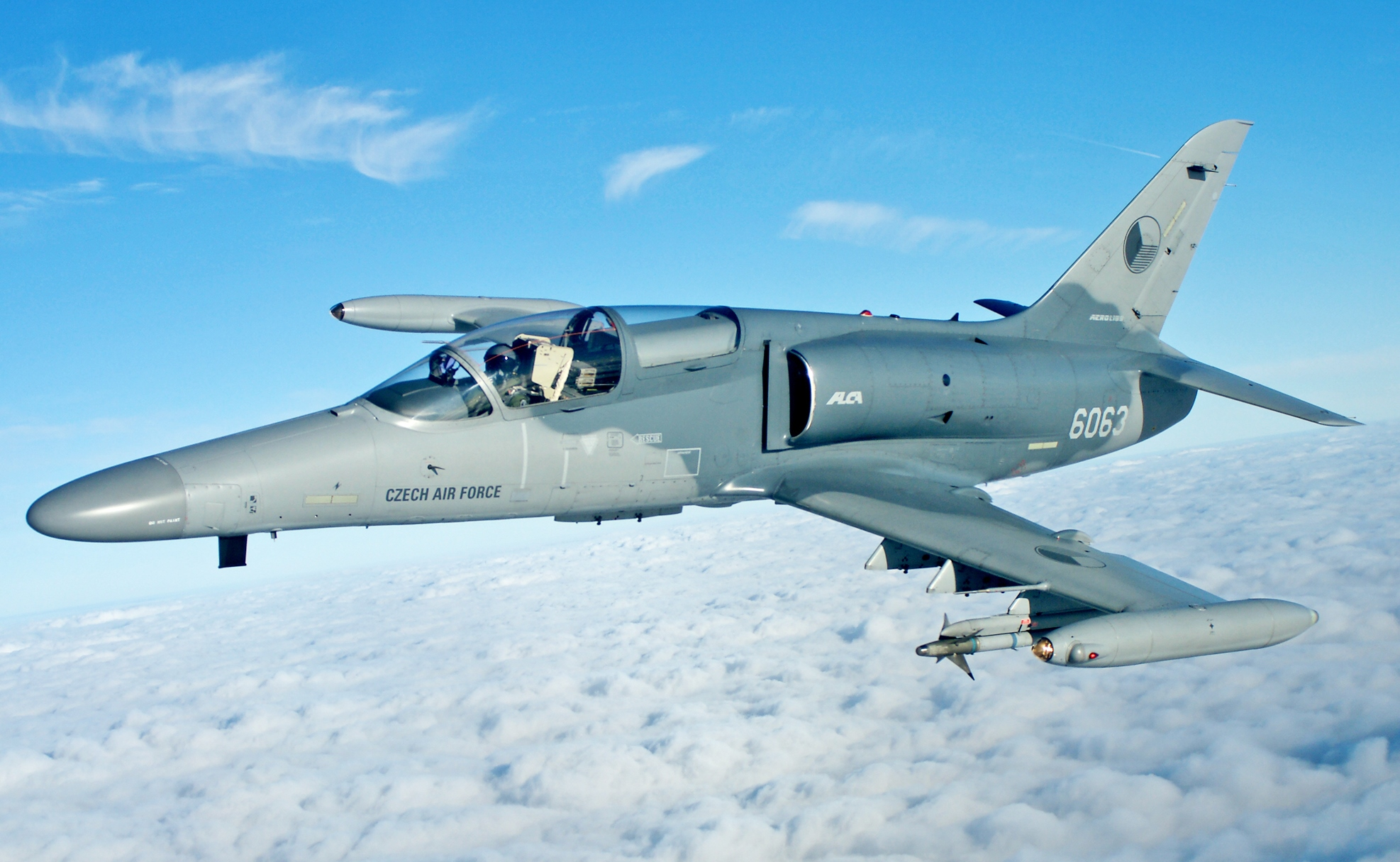
An Aero L-159 ALCA, a type of light combat aircraft, carrying an AIM-9 Sidewinder short-range air-to-air missile

A light combat aircraft (LCA) is a light, multirole jet-powered military aircraft, commonly derived from jet trainer designs, designed for engaging in light combat. It can support light strike or attack missions, reconnaissance, interdiction roles, or trainer roles, and even air-to-air fighting. Light combat aircraft can also be used as cost-effective anti-drone platforms (such as against one-way attack drones and loitering munitions). This type of aircraft is generally equipped with more sensors compared to light-attack-capable jet trainers that focus on ground attack as a secondary role and armed turboprop light attack aircraft that are generally used as counter-insurgency aircraft.

== Characteristics ==
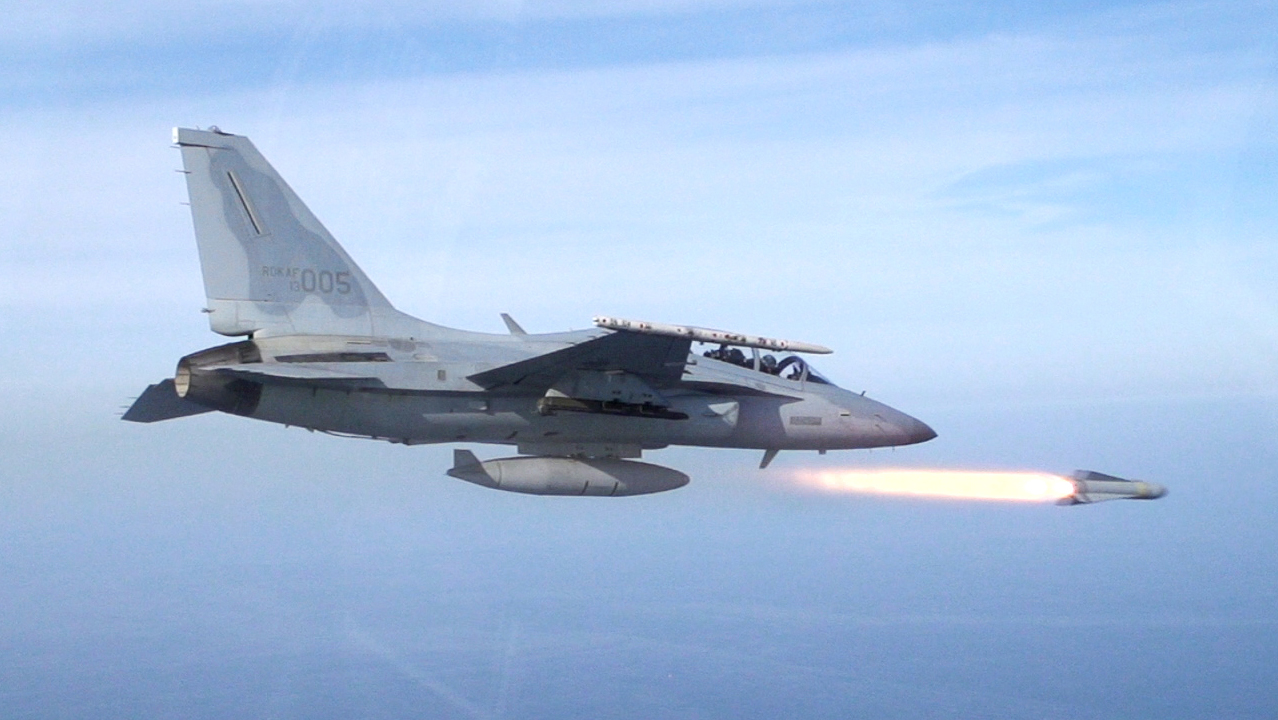
KAI FA-50 light combat aircraft, a variant of the KAI T-50 advanced jet trainer, is firing an AGM-65G Maverick air-to-surface missile

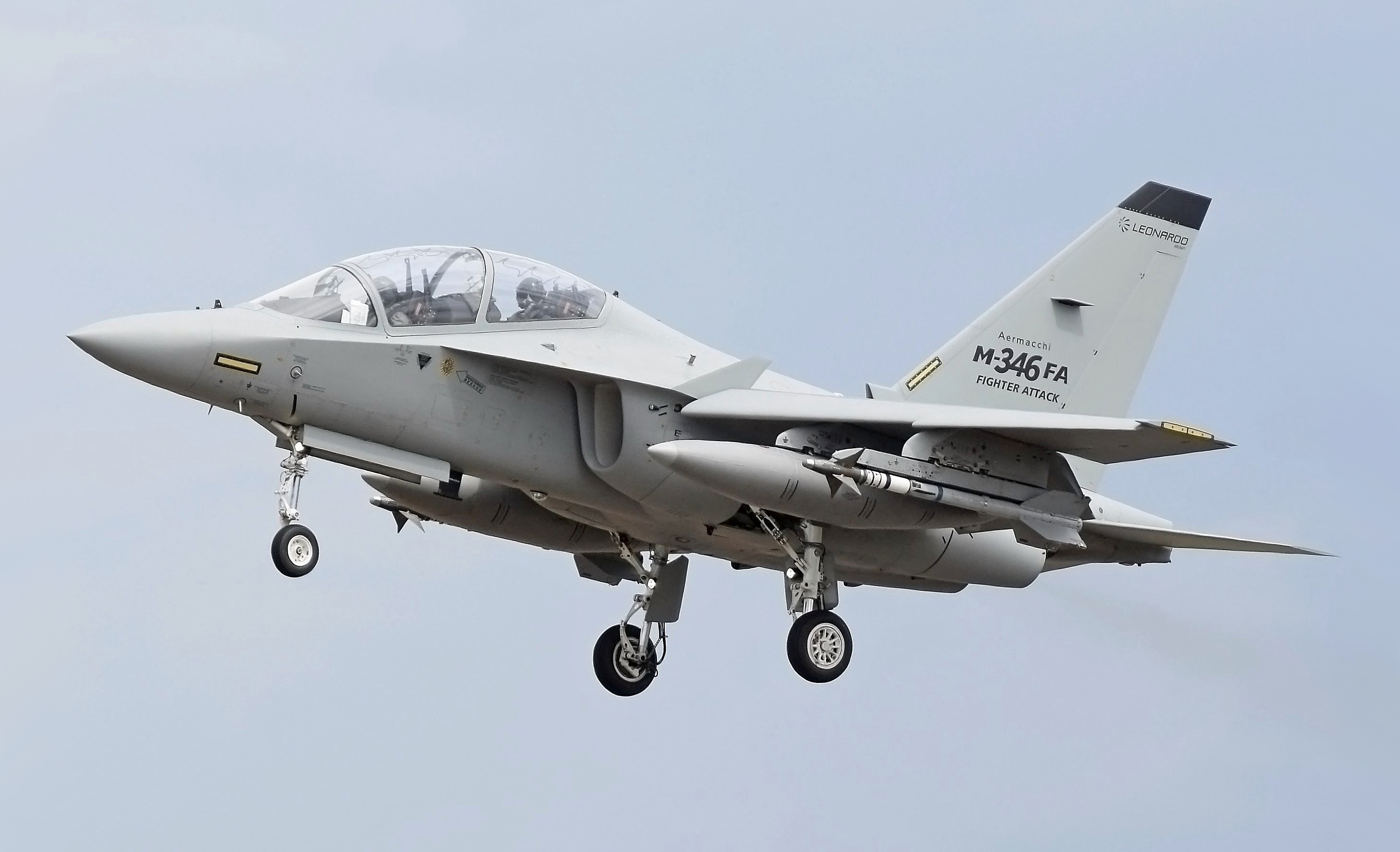
The M-346FA is the first light combat aircraft in the world to achieved the capability to command a loyal wingman drone

They are typically slower than larger multirole or strike aircraft such as the American F-18, F-15E Strike Eagle, or Soviet MiG-29. Most light combat aircraft are capable only of subsonic speeds, although some are capable of reaching Mach 1+. An LCA will typically be equipped with bombs, gun pods, or short-range air-to-air missiles used for COIN or CAS missions.

Some aircraft integrate more advanced armaments such as smart bombs, air to ground missiles, Electronic warfare pods, and electronic targeting systems. However, these aircraft are usually used for self-defense or anti-hostile aircraft/helicopter missions, not for high intensity air-defense missions typically carried out by at least lightweight fighters. However, some LCAs are capable of air-to-air combat or point air defense missions if equipped with multi-mode radar systems. The majority of those aircraft are not equipped with BVR air-to-air missiles but are armed only with short-range air-to-air missiles for an air defense role. Light combat aircraft are often used to patrol the skies, conduct border patrols and air policing, or serve as cost-effective interceptors against slow-flying aircraft.

== Combat and operational history ==
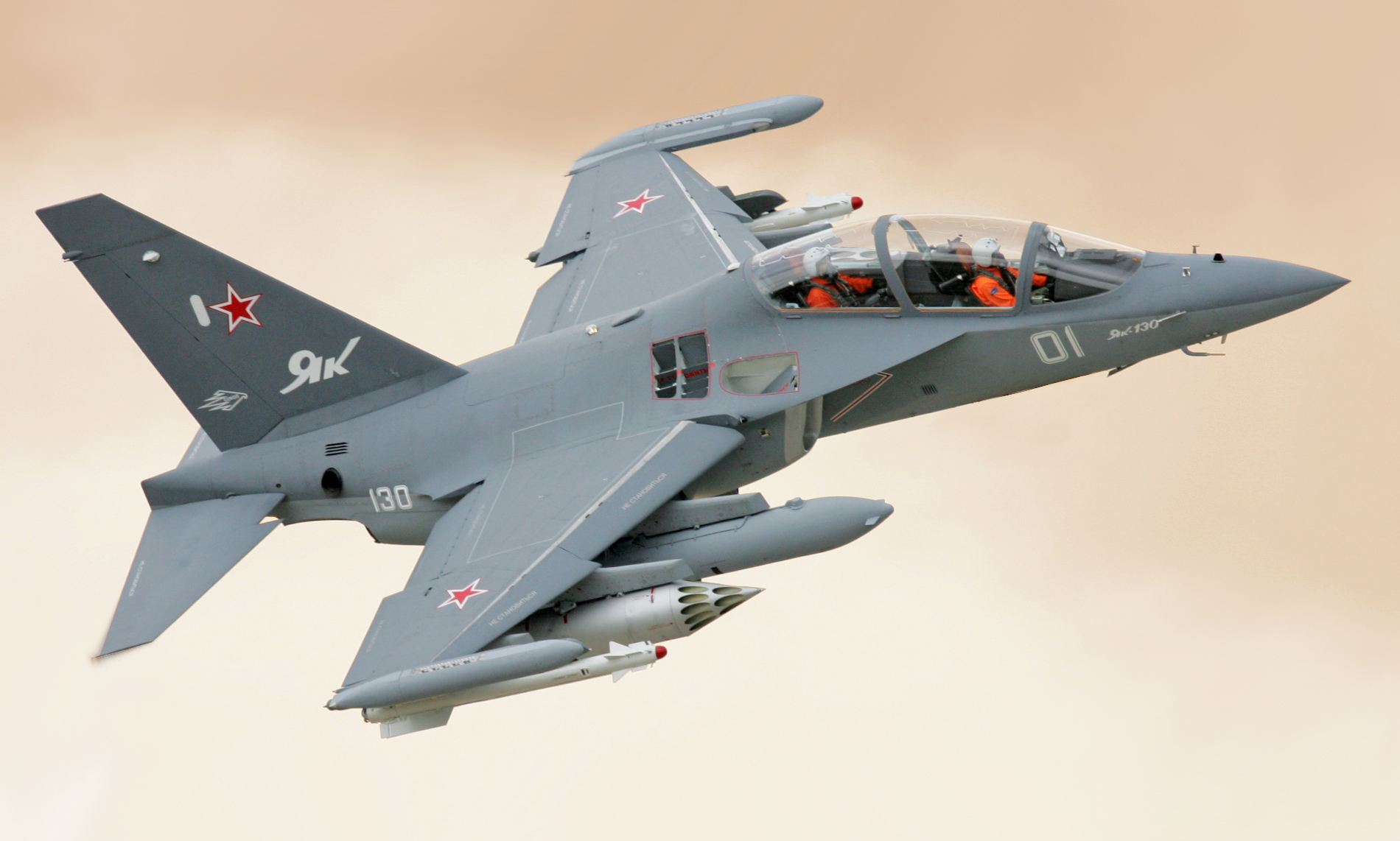
A Russian Air Force Yakovlev Yak-130 carrying R-73 short-range air-to-air missiles and rocket pods

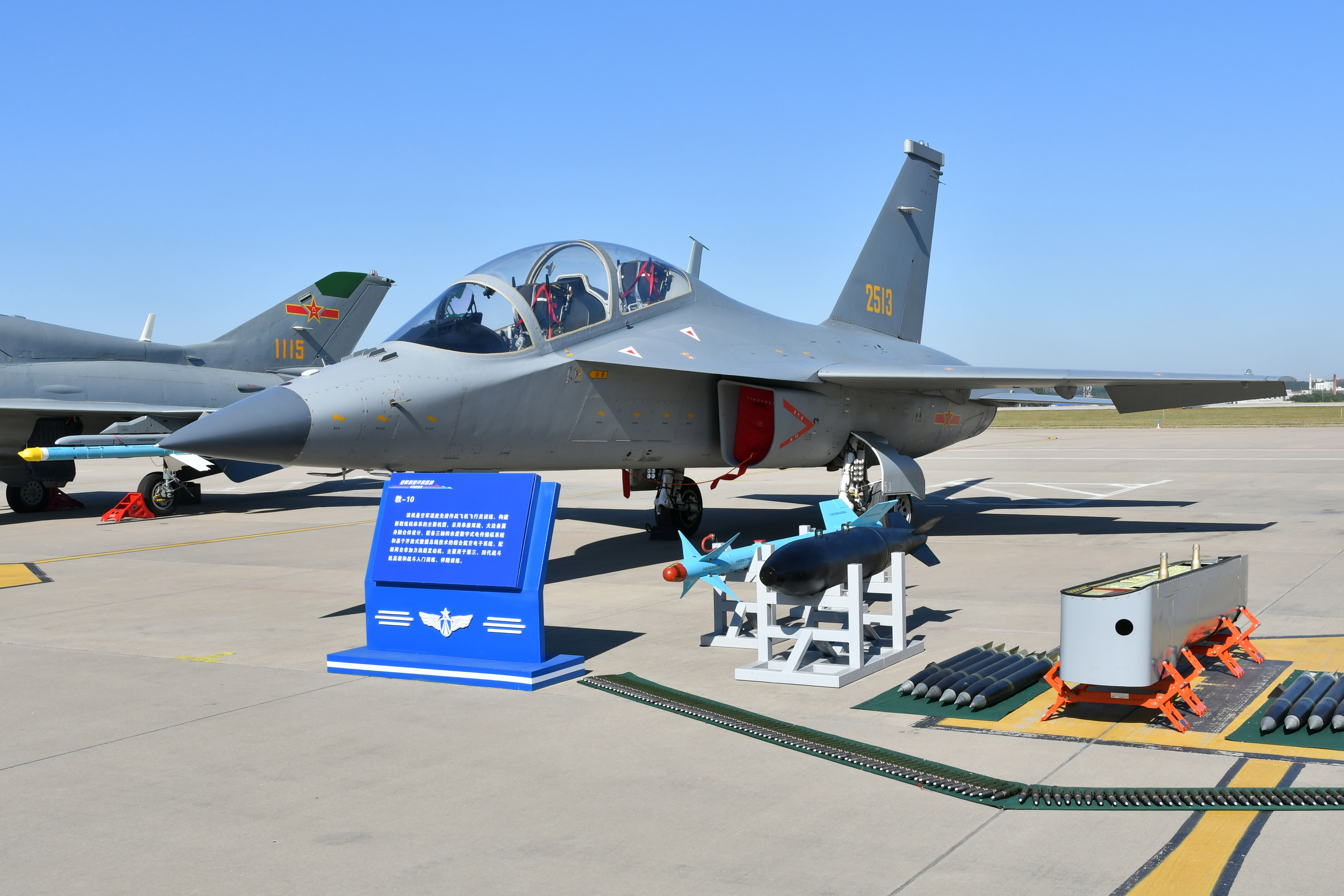
PLAAF JL-10 with armaments including the PL-5 short-range air-to-air missile

The Yak-130 has been used in combat in the internal conflict in Myanmar, at least since 2020. In the 2026 Iran war, Iran used its Yak-130s to complement MiG-29s in air defence duties over Tehran. On 4 March 2026, a Yak-130 was shot down by an Israeli F-35 Adir during a dog fight.

On September 2, 2026, an aerial encounter happened over the disputed Scarborough Shoal in the South China Sea. Three Chinese military Hongdu JL-10 light combat aircraft intercepted and drove away three propeller driven Philippine aircraft when armed with PL-5 short-range air-to-air missiles. China used the JL-10 light combat aircraft for low-risk interception missions as a cost-effective strategy.

== Aircraft ==
The list of light combat aircraft currently in service is as follows.

Country/Territory	Manufacturer	Aircraft	Introduced
United Kingdom	British Aerospace	Hawk 200	1986
Czech Republic	Aero Vodochody	L-159 ALCA	2000
China	Guizhou Aircraft Industry Corporation	JL-9	2003
Russia	Yakovlev	Yak-130	2010
South Korea	Korea Aerospace Industries	FA-50 Fighting Eagle	2013
China	Hongdu	JL-10	2013
Italy	Alenia Aermacchi	M-346 Master	2015
Czech Republic	Aero Vodochody	L-39 Skyfox	2018

== See also ==
- Light fighter
