= Sojka III =

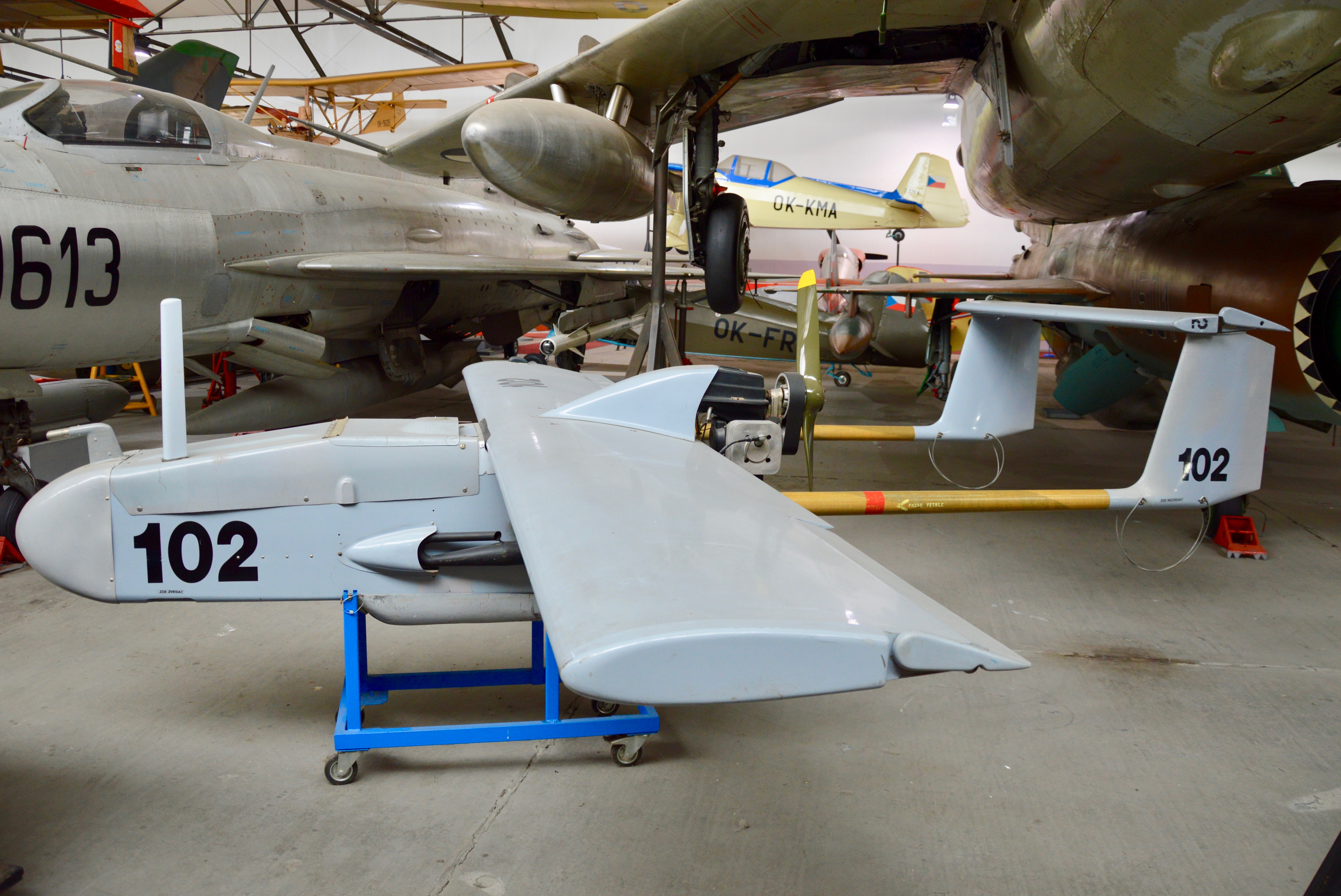
- Sojka III in the Kbely Aviation Museum, Prague

General information
- Type: unmanned aerial vehicle (UAV)
- National origin: Czech Republic
- Primary user: Czech Army

Sojka III is an unmanned aerial vehicle (UAV) operated by the Czech Army until it was decommissioned in December 2011.

== Usage ==
The mission of Sojka ("jaybird") is to provide aerial reconnaissance, radio reconnaissance, artillery fire observation, electronic warfare, or to launch infrared targets for air defence training.

A Sojka unit usually consists of three or four Sojka UAVs, a transport truck, launch truck, control and monitoring vehicle, and an off-road vehicle for transport of the landed UAV.

== Flight ==
The Sojka is launched from a ramp using a rocket-assisted device to get takeoff speed. Wind limits are 12 m/s against the wind or 3 m/s in a side wind. A wind speed of lower than 8 km/h is required to get a good optical environment.

The operator can choose between two modes:

- Semiautomatic – the operator can change the altitude and direction of the UAV
- Automatic – the operator can specify up to eight turning points. The operator can switch to semiautomatic mode or order plane to return to the starting point at any time.

Landing can be done using a parachute or via operator control.

== Specifications (Sojka III) ==
Data from

General characteristics

- Capacity: 20–30 kg (44–66 lb)
- Length: 3.78 m (12 ft 5 in)
- Wingspan: 4.12 m (13 ft 6 in)
- Max takeoff weight: 145 kg (320 lb)

Performance

- Maximum speed: 180 km/h (110 mph, 97 kn)
- Cruise speed: 130 km/h (81 mph, 70 kn)
- Range: 100 km (62 mi, 54 nmi)
