= Aero L-39 Skyfox =

Czech light military aircraft

L-39 Skyfox
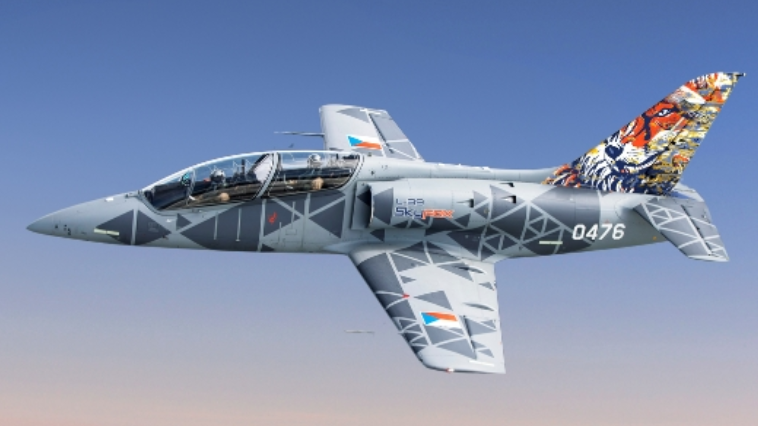

General information
- Other name: L-39NG
- Type: Advanced jet trainer Light combat aircraft
- National origin: Czech Republic
- Manufacturer: Aero Vodochody
- Status: In service
- Primary users: Vietnam People's Air Force; Hungarian Air Force Flight Training Center Pardubice
- Number built: ~ 40 (2026)

History
- Manufactured: 2015–2024 (developmental); 2024 onwards (serial)
- First flight: 14 September 2015 (L-39CW); 22 December 2018 (L-39NG)
- Developed from: Aero L-39 Albatros

The Aero L-39 Skyfox, also known as Aero L-39NG ("Next Generation"), is a turbofan-powered military trainer, light combat and drone interceptor aircraft developed and produced by the Czech aircraft manufacturer Aero Vodochody. It is a successor of the Cold War era Aero L-39 Albatros.

In July 2014, Aero Vodochody announced the launch of the L-39NG programme. By April 2015, the company revealed a partnership with Draken International and Williams International to jointly work on the project — the latter provides its FJ44-4M turbofan engine for the aircraft, while Draken is responsible for the type on the North American market, as well as operating its own fleet. On 14 September 2015, the maiden flight of the L-39NG technology demonstrator (L-39CW) was completed. On 14 March 2018, the L-39CW was received its type certification. On 22 December 2018, the first L-39NG prototype conducted its first flight. In September 2020, the Czech Defence Ministry certificated the L-39NG using supranational military standards. In October 2024, as the company reached serial production, the type was officially named Skyfox. By January 2025 the first L-39 Skyfox had been delivered to Flight Training Center Pardubice (which is the training organization of Czech Air Force). In September 2026, a dedicated Skyfox Drone Hunter version was introduced that may be armed with up to 28 laser-guided rockets, intended as a cheap drone interceptor alternative to standard fighter jets.

The L-39NG project has been divided into two distinct stages, or versions. The Stage 1 programme is an upgrade that is available to existing L-39 operators; the original airframes are retrofitted with a new engine and (optionally) modern avionics. The Stage 2 programme involves the production of new-build aircraft; these benefit from several design improvements, such as the use of a wet wing, eliminating the original L-39's distinctive wingtip fuel tanks. Numerous civil and military customers have placed orders for the L-39NG, including a dedicated reconnaissance variant.

== Design and development ==
On 16 July 2014, while attending the Farnborough Airshow, Aero Vodochody presented its L-39NG project as a follow-up to its popular Aero L-39 Albatros trainer aircraft. By April 2015, Aero Vodochody had formed a partnership with the American defence services provider Draken International and engine manufacturer Williams International to collaborate on the L-39NG programme; under this agreement, Draken International assumed responsibility for the type in the North American market. For other regions of the world, Aero remains responsible for the modernisation of existing aircraft at their facilities in the Czech Republic.

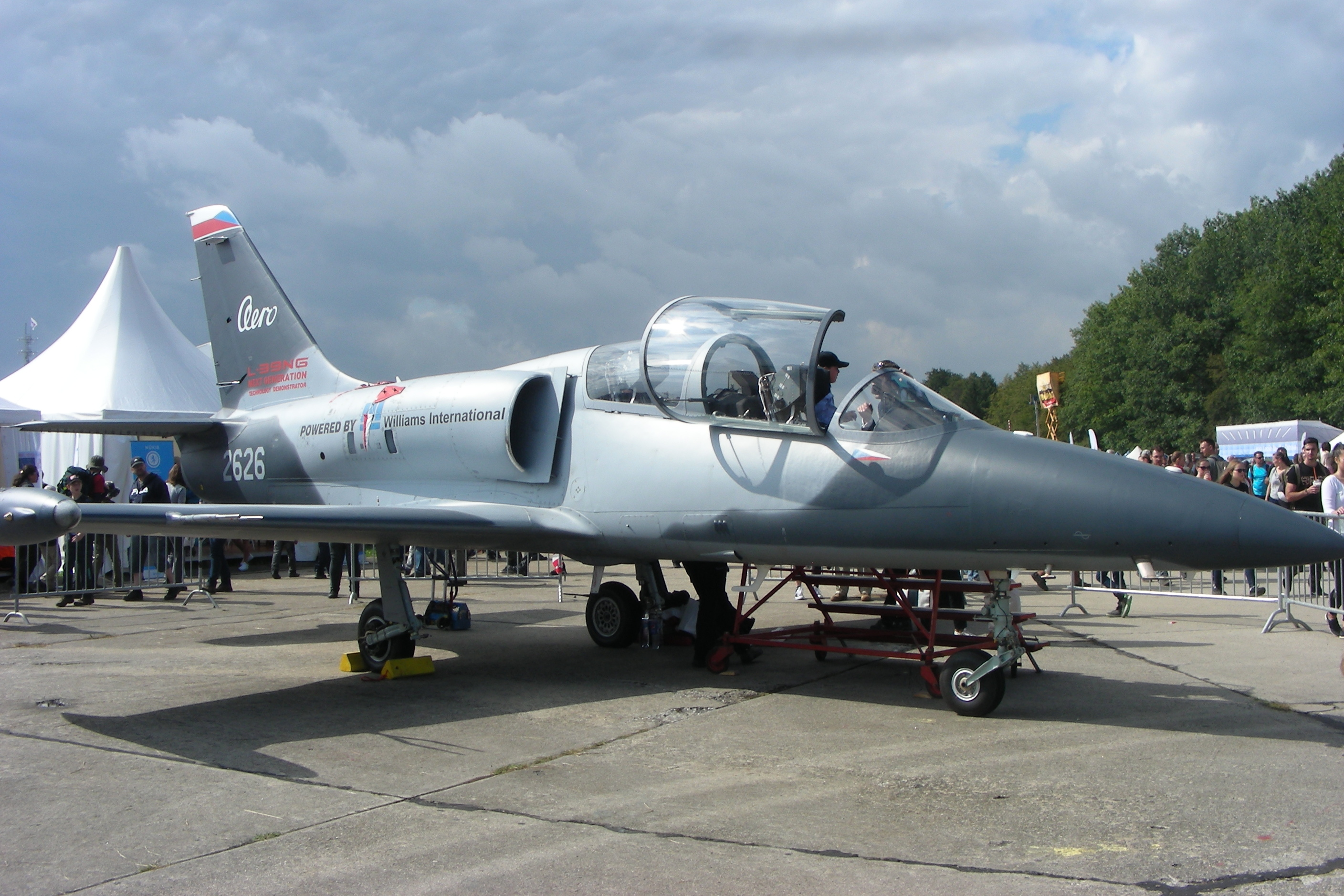
Stage 1 L-39NG (L-39CW), NATO Days 2018

The L-39NG aircraft is being developed and marketed in two stages. The L-39NG upgrade program (Stage 1) involves an installation of FJ44-4M turbofan engine and optionally the Stage 2 avionics to existing L-39 Albatros. The FJ44-4M engine generated almost identical thrust output to the Soviet-era Ivchenko AI-25 engine that powered the original L-39 series, but at a considerably lower fuel consumption as well as possessing more favourable operating characteristics. On 14 September 2015, the maiden flight of the L-39NG technology demonstrator (L-39CW) was completed, with the first stage of development to be declared complete that same month. On 20 November 2017, Aero Vodochody announced they have completed the development of the L-39CW. On 14 March 2018, the company announced that the L-39CW had received type certification, signifying its airworthiness and readiness for serial production.

The second phase (Stage 2) represents newly built L-39NG aircraft with the possible use of components from the previous upgrade to Stage 1, once the original airframe reaches the end of its life. The new airframe is considerably lighter and produces less drag, overall, the redesigned aircraft was said to have comparable operating costs to contemporary turboprops. Amongst other advances, modern composite construction is used. In June 2017, Aero Vodochody unveiled its plan to build four pre-production examples of L-39NG for testing and demonstration. In July 2017, Aero Vodochody began producing parts for the assembly of four aircraft, three of which are to be prototypes and one pre-serial production aircraft.

In April 2018, a partnership agreement was signed between Aero Vodochody and Israel Aerospace Industries (IAI) for the integration of the latter's virtual training solutions onto the L-39NG, in addition to jointly working on other projects. The first L-39NG prototype was rolled out in Odolena Voda on 12 October 2018, and conducted its maiden flight on 22 December 2018. During September 2020, the Czech Defence Ministry certified the L39NG in accordance with new supranational military standards recognised by all EU and NATO military authorities; this allows the aircraft to operate in international airspace and that it conforms with all safety requirements. In July 2022, EU/NATO certification to EMAR 21 standards was granted for the baseline version of the L-39NG.

=== Testing ===
The technology demonstrator L-39CW, a conventional airframe outfitted with the FJ44-4M engine and other retrofitted elements, performed its first flight from Vodochody airport on 14 September 2015. In September 2016, Aero Vodochody announced that it had completed the first phase of testing with the L-39CW, and was now ready to proceed with the development of the more comprehensive new-build L-39NG.

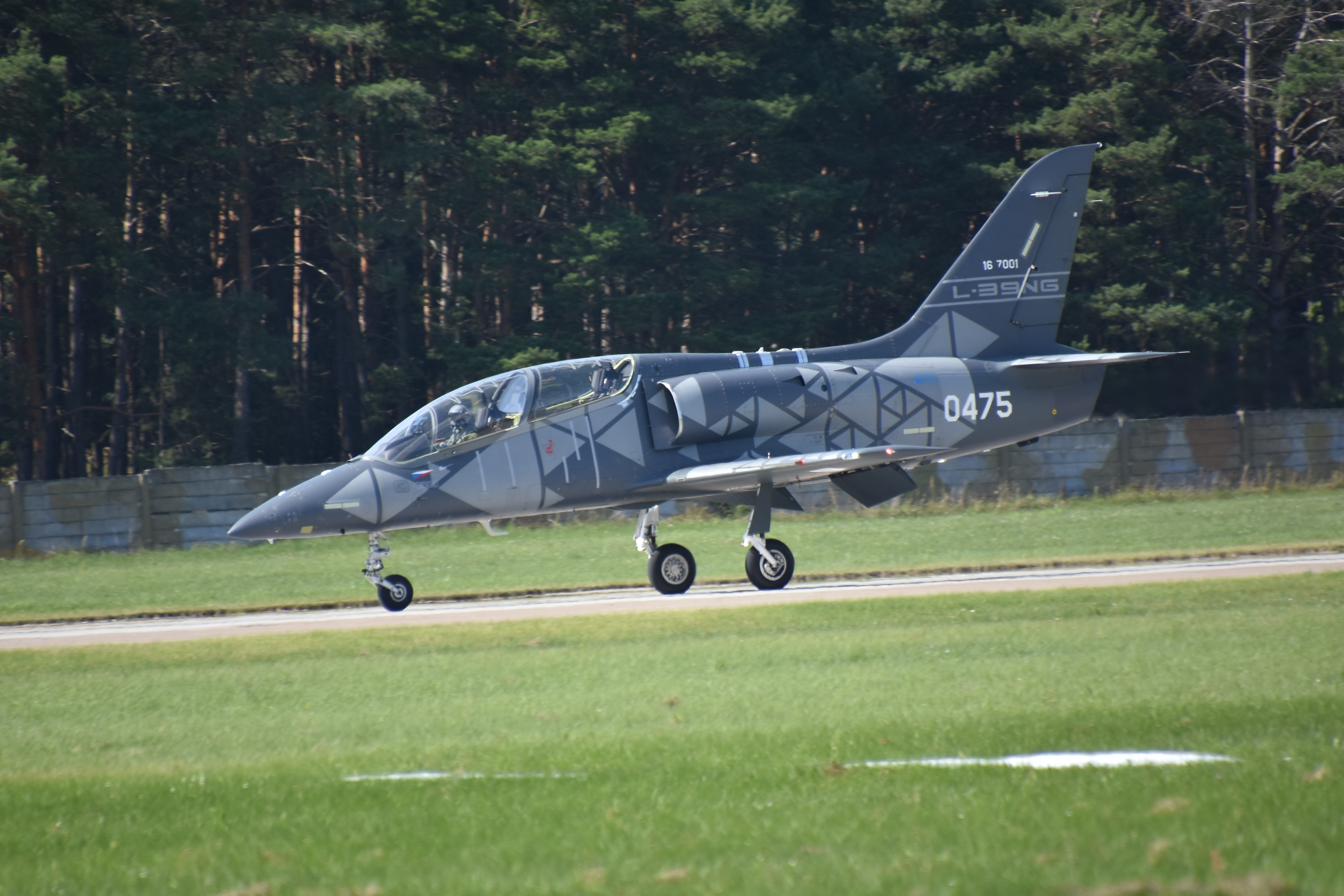
The first L-39NG prototype

The full prototype L-39NG conducted its maiden flight, as per schedule, on 22 December 2018. In 2019, it was announced that Aero Vodochody was changing the L-39NG's certification schedule, this was reportedly in response to customer demands for increased capability; the move was to facilitate the clearance of deliveries in the full trainer configuration during the latter part of 2020, whereas the earlier intent had been to secure approval for a basic standard sometime in late 2019. By September 2019, a total of three aircraft were involved in the test programme; the L-39CW was being used for avionics testing and investigations of its spin/stall characteristics, while the prototype L-39NG was conducting basic performance testing, including ground vibration testing at the Czech Aerospace Research Centre; reportedly, weapons testing for the light attack role had also been performed.

On 25 May 2020, the L-39 Skyfox commenced static fatigue testing, one reported aim of which is to validate the new airframe's operating life of 5,000 flight hours. By September 2020, roughly 300 test flights has been performed by the two flying prototypes, while additional ground-based testing using a pair of static airframes had also been conducted. Aero has claimed that life cycle testing has shown the aircraft to have a viable service life of up to 15,000 flight hours, three times that of the original L-39. The engine's increased efficiency has also reportedly facilitated a maximum range of 1,900 km without external fuel tanks, 800 km greater than that of the L-39. During January 2022, Aero announced the successful completion of fatigue testing. According to an article published in 2025, the L-39NG costs between $15-$20 million per jet.

== Variants ==
=== L-39CW ===
Technology demonstrator of the L-39NG based on the L-39C airframe, powered by a Williams International FJ44-4M turbofan engine.

=== L-39NG Stage 1 ===
Re-engined L-39 Albatros powered by the Williams International FJ44-4M turbofan. This version has the original "dry" wing with wingtip fuel tanks. Optionally includes an installation of the L-39NG Stage 2 avionics.

=== L-39NG Stage 2 (Skyfox) ===
New-build L-39NG trainer and light combat aircraft, outfitted with Genesys Aerosystems avionics suite and glass cockpit. The new airframe is equipped with a new wet wing with internal fuel tanks and five hardpoints; it is powered by a FJ44-4M engine.

=== Reconnaissance version ===
Hungary ordered four reconnaissance versions of the L-39NG to be developed and produced. For this purpose, it is furnished with a Wescam-supplied MX-15E electro-optical day and night sensor mounted beneath the fuselage.

=== L-39 Skyfox Drone Hunter ===
During the 2026 NATO Days, Aero Vodochody presented the Skyfox Drone Hunter demonstrator as a specialized variant of the aircraft. The demonstrator is equipped with a "Phoenix" electro-optical pod made by Australian company SiNAB, with the goal of a more powerful, fully integrated electro-optical aiming system in the future. As the main effector, the demonstrator uses FZ275 LGR 70 mm laser-guided rockets, with the possibility of integrating APKWS II also being offered. The base configuration offers 14 rockets in two pods with an option for an upgraded version with 28 rockets in four pods. The crew consists of a pilot and a weapons operator. The manufacturer cites its low operating cost of around €2,000 per flight hour as the main benefit of Skyfox Drone Hunter over standard fighter jets whose operating costs are at least ten times higher. RUSI's September 2026 analysis referred to the Skyfox Drone Hunter as "perhaps the most compelling option" for a NATO Multinational Drone-Interception Squadron, as during their testing it showed the best capability to intercept both fast jet drones as well as slow ICE drones..

== Operational history ==
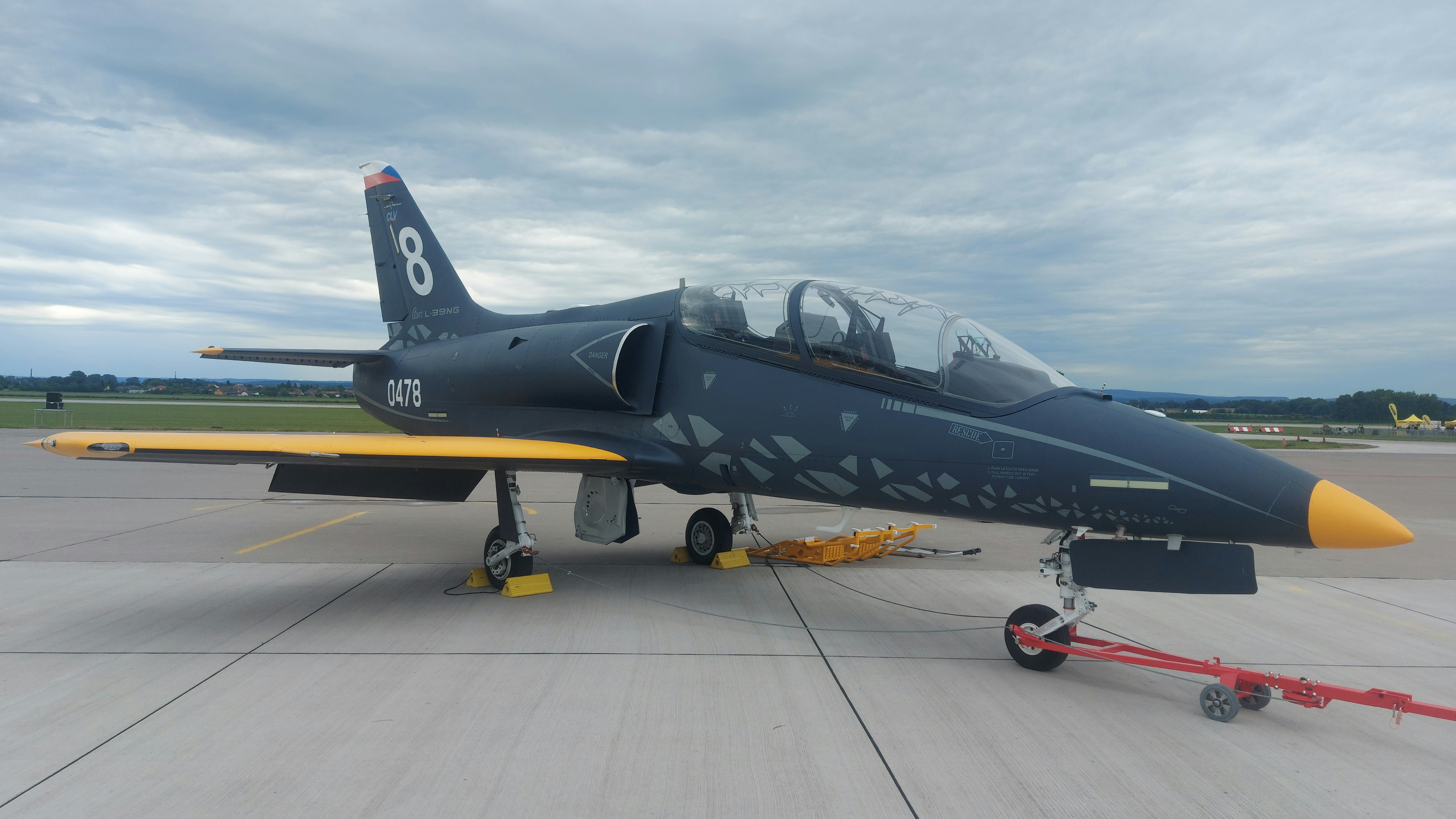
Aero L-39NG Skyfox aircraft operated by CLV Pardubice

=== Czech Republic ===
The first customer for the L-39NG Stage 1 was announced at the Paris Air Show in June 2015. LOM Praha, a Czech state-owned enterprise, has ordered the L-39NG for use at its Flight Training Center (CLV) at Pardubice Airport. In 2022, LOM Praha signed agreement for delivery of four L-39NG to replace its fleet of L-39C used for Czech Air Force training.

=== Vietnam ===
Vietnam ordered 12 L-39NG trainers to Vietnam in February 2021. The order includes assorted spare parts, equipment for ground-based training, logistics support, and specialised airport systems. This batch of the new-build L-39NGs will be delivered to Vietnam's People Air Force from July 2023 through to 2024. The airframes were built and delivered with "Eastern setup" fulfilling Vietnamese demand to operate its backbone Russian-made fleet.

The new L-39NG were commissioned under the Regiment 910 of the Air Force Officer's College, Air Defense - Air Force Service of the Vietnam People's Army, purposed to partially replace the existing L-39C fleet. Vietnam has received its first L-39NG batch in late 2023 and received the final 12th plane in April 2025. In September 2026, Vietnamese Air Force conducted first training air-to-ground live-fire attacks with Skyfoxes, using both bombs as well as unguided rockets.

=== Hungary ===
Hungary ordered eight L-39NG trainers along with four reconnaissance-oriented L-39NG aircraft in April 2022. At the time of the deal, the terms of which are being kept confidential, the latter version was still in the development phase. The initial three L-39NG trainers were delivered in May 2025.

== Operators ==
=== Current operators ===
Czech Republic (8)

- LOM Praha

Flight Training Center Pardubice

Hungary (12)

- Hungarian Air Force

101st Air Wing, Kecskemét Air Base

Vietnam (12)

- Vietnam People's Air Force

910th Air Training Regiment, Tuy Hoa Airport

=== Future operators ===
Angola (Four on order)

Ordered in June 2026.

Armenia (Four on order)

Ordered in October 2026.

Ukraine (Four on order)

Order confirmed in November 2026.

=== Potential operators ===
Algeria
Algeria is reportedly negotiating towards purchasing the L-39NG to be used in the Algeria Air Force.
Cambodia
The Cambodian Ministry of National Defense plans to purchase five L-39NG light fighter jets from the Czech Republic to replace its old L-39C in 2019.
France
Breitling Jet Team ordered upgrade of its existing L-39 fleet to L-39NG in 2018.
Ghana
Parliament of Ghana had approved a €111,4 million performance sales and purchase agreement for the supply of six L-39NG training and light combat aircraft for the Ghana Air Force in December 2021.
Mongolia
Representatives of Mongolia stated interest in buying several L-39 Skyfox jets in October 2026.
Nigeria
Nigeria is reportedly interested in the L-39NG to replace its current L-39 Albatros fleet.
Philippines
Philippine defense officials were reportedly satisfied enough with the Aero L-39 Skyfox's performance that they were willing to acquire 12 of them to replace its aging SIAI-Marchetti S.211.
Portugal
Skytech, a company based in Portugal, placed an order for 12 L-39NGs at the 2018 Farnborough Airshow. The order includes an option for another six.
Serbia
Serbia could order 6-8 L-39NGs soon. It was initially presented as a completed sale by the Czech Prime Minister Andrej Babiš, but according to Aero Vodochody, the final contract has not been signed yet, even though the negotiations are continuing.
Slovakia
Slovakia has shown interest in purchasing Skyfox Drone Hunter variant.
Ukraine
Negotiations are underway regarding the order of 12 additional Skyfoxes on top of the four previously ordered.
United States
Draken International signed an agreement with Aero Vodochody for up to six of the L-39s of Draken's display team to receive the L-39NG upgrade in 2015.
RSW Aviation placed an order for 12 L-39NG and six L-39CW at the 2018 Farnborough Airshow.

== Specifications (L-39 Skyfox) ==
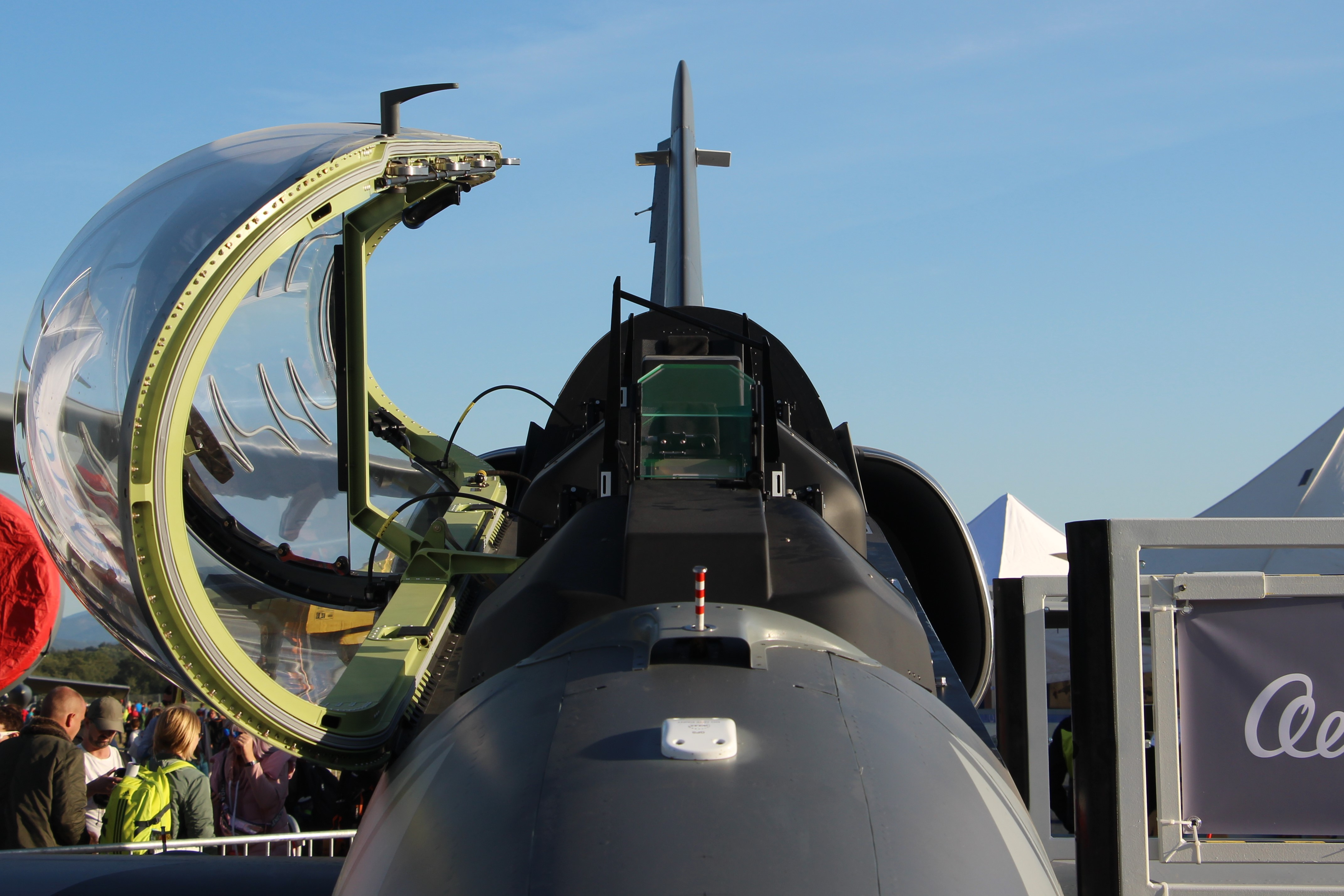
Close view of the upper forward fuselage and cockpit

Data from L-39 Next Generation web page

General characteristics

- Crew: 2
- Length: 11.83 m (38 ft 10 in)
- Wingspan: 9.37 m (30 ft 9 in)
- Airfoil: NACA 64A012
- Empty weight: 3,100 kg (6,834 lb)
- Max takeoff weight: 5,800 kg (12,787 lb)
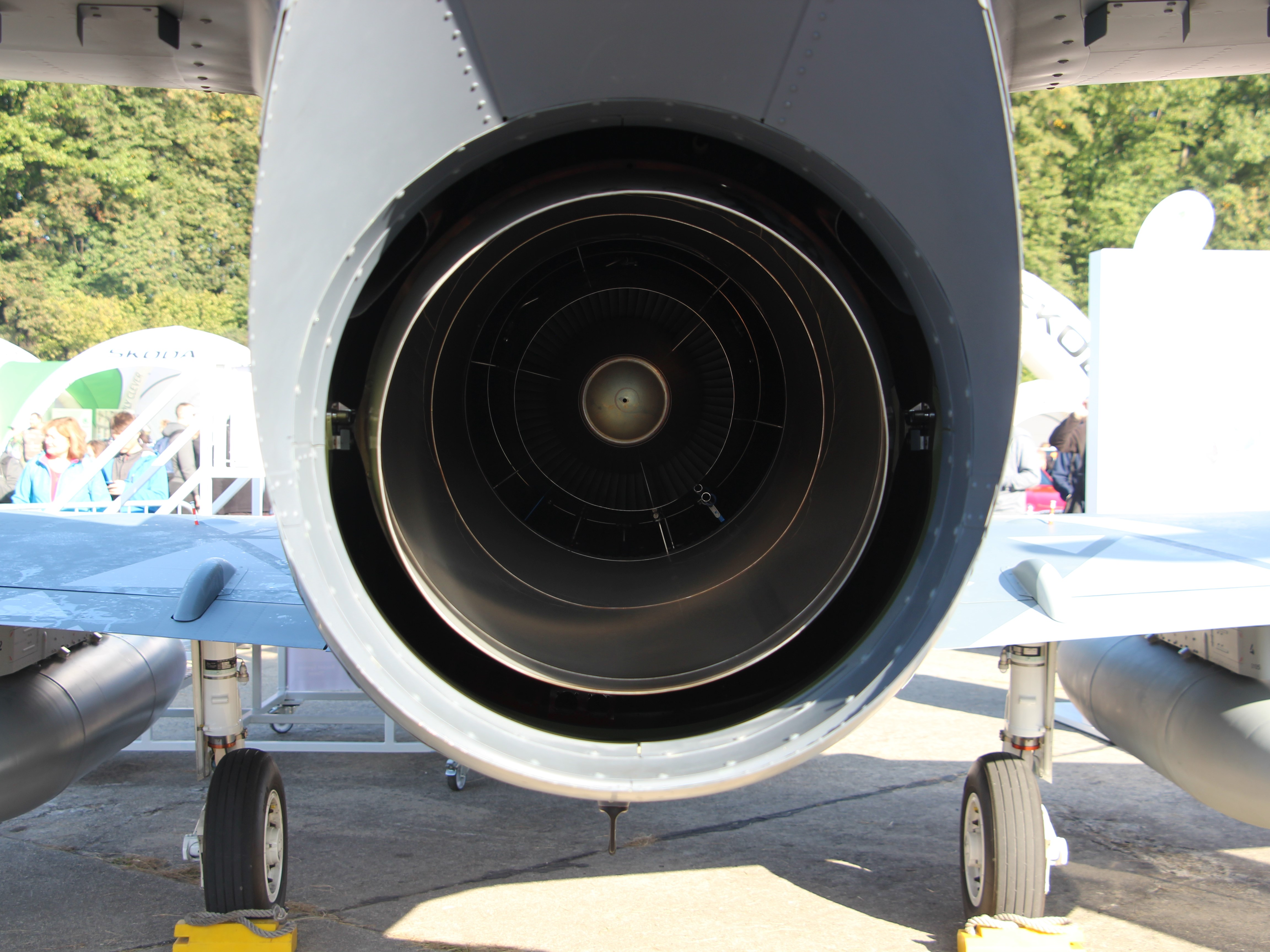
  Rear view of a L-39 Skyfox and its Williams FJ44 engine
- Powerplant: 1 × Williams International FJ44-4M turbofan engine, 16.89 kN (3,800 lbf) thrust

Performance

- Maximum speed: 900 km/h (560 mph, 490 kn) TAS at 6,000 m (20,000 ft)
- Range: 2,590 km (1,610 mi, 1,400 nmi) (internal fuel)
- Endurance: four hours and 30 minutes (internal fuel)
- Service ceiling: 11,500 m (37,700 ft)
- Rate of climb: 23 m/s (4,500 ft/min)

Armament

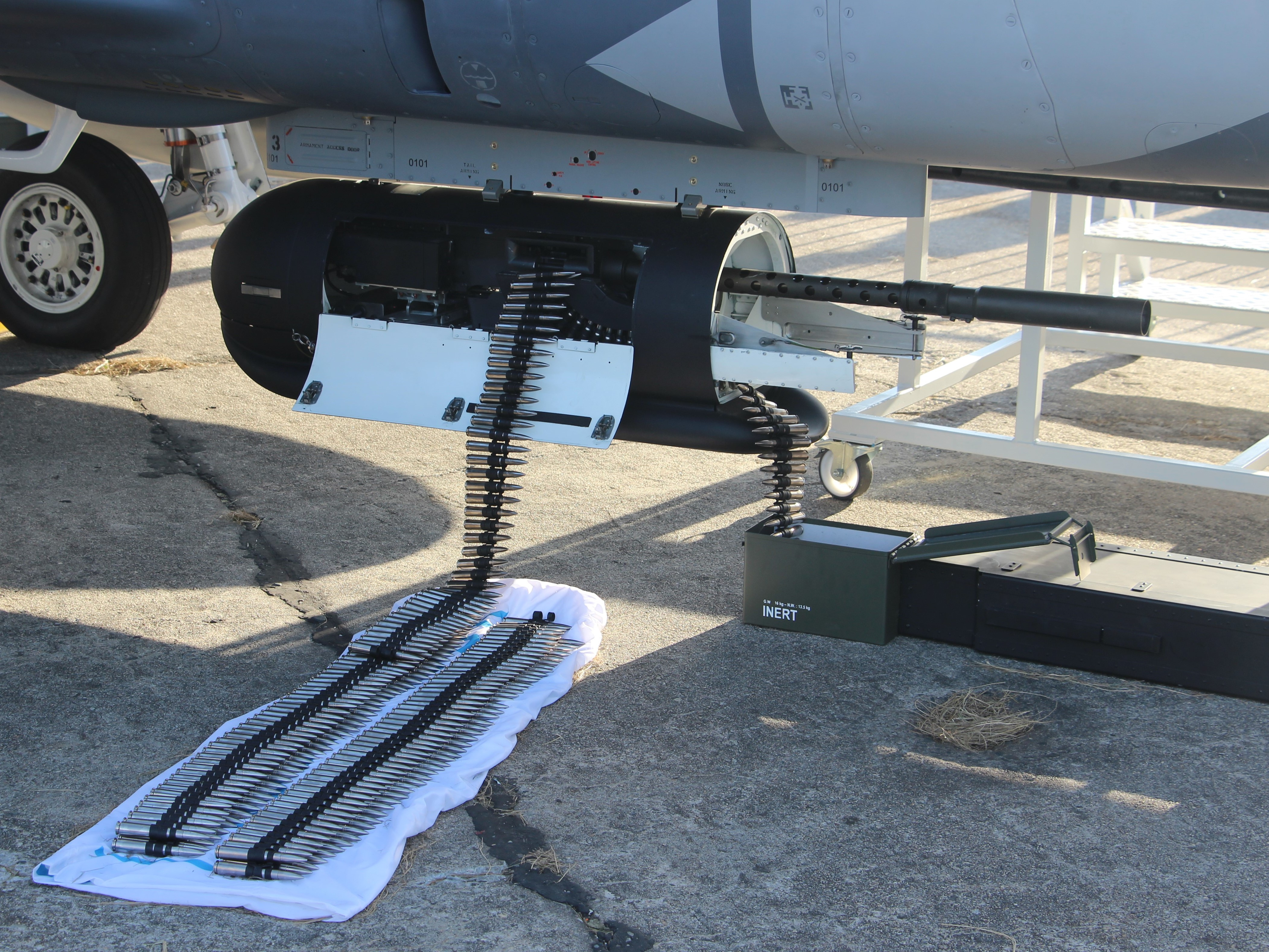
A gun pod for the L-39NG

- Up to 1,640 kg (3,616 lb) of stores on five external hardpoints
- Up to 570 kg (1,250 lb) of external fuel on two "wet" hardpoints
- IR seeking AA missiles (incl. CATM)
- Laser guided air-to-ground bombs (GBU)
- Laser guided air-to-ground rockets (70mm)
- Laser guided air-to-air rockets (70mm)
- Free fall air-to-ground bombs (Mk.82)
- FFAR unguided air-to-ground rockets (70mm)
- Air-to-air or air-to-ground gun pod (12.7/20mm)

Avionics

- Programmable jamming pod
- Targeting pod
- FLIR turret

== See also ==
Related development

- Aero L-39 Albatros
- Aero L-159 ALCA

Aircraft of comparable role, configuration, and era

- Alenia Aermacchi M-345
- BAE Systems Hawk
- HAL HJT-36 Sitara
- Hongdu JL-8
- IAR 99 TD
- McDonnell Douglas T-45 Goshawk
- SAT SR-10
