= Jet trainer =

Jet aircraft used for training pilots

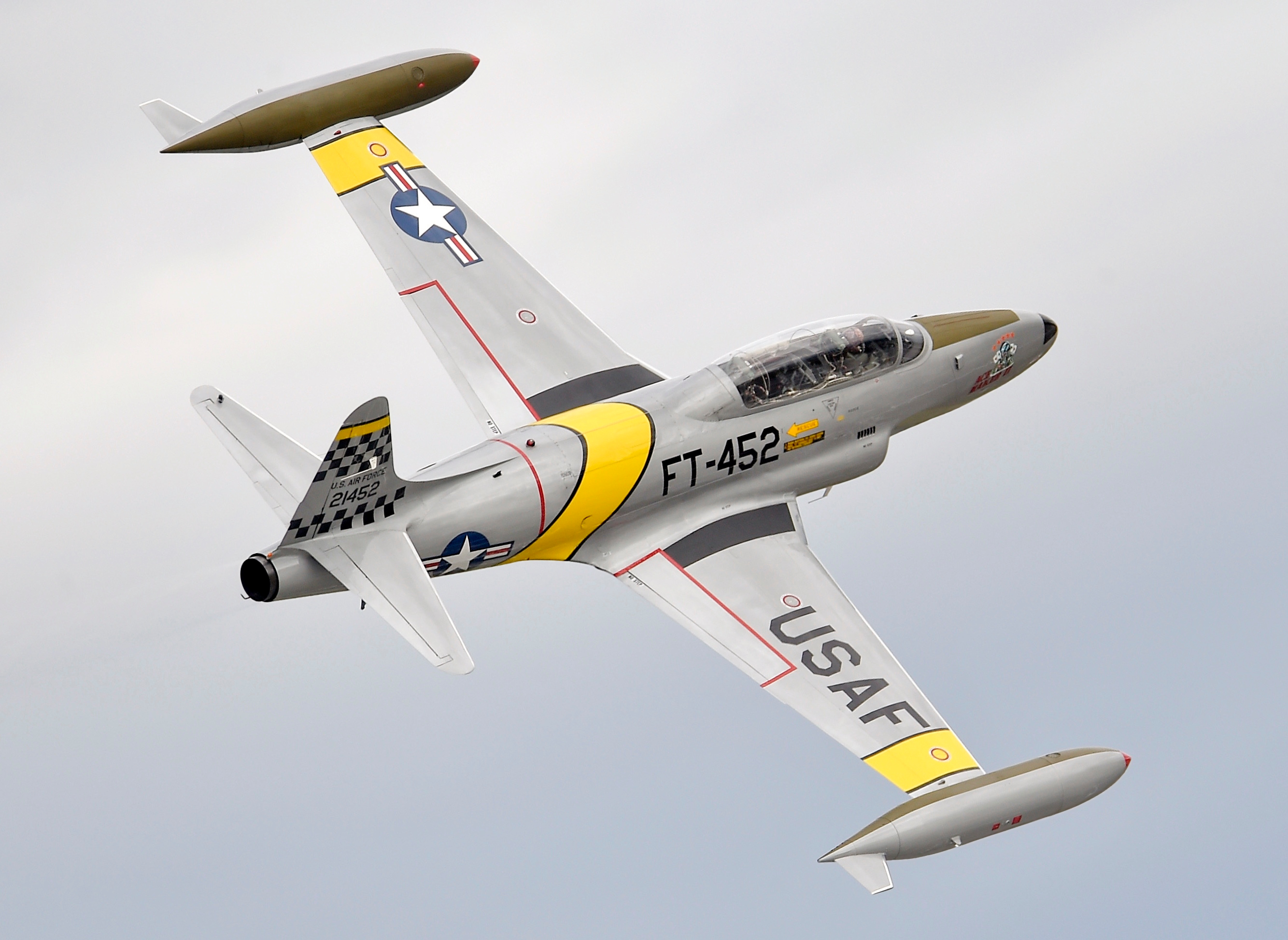
The Lockheed T-33, the most produced jet trainer

A jet trainer is a jet aircraft for use as a trainer, whether for basic or advanced flight training. Jet trainers are either custom designs or modifications of existing aircraft. With the introduction of military jet-powered aircraft towards the end of World War II it became a requirement to train pilots in the handling of such aircraft.

== History ==
The first generation of trainers in the 1940s were modified from existing designs like the Gloster Meteor and Lockheed T-33, but these were followed by custom training aircraft like the Aero L-29 Delfín and the BAC Jet Provost.

As training developed, different air forces used jet trainers for different phases of training. Although most air forces continued to use piston or later turboprop aircraft for basic training, a number of jet trainers like the Cessna T-37 Tweet appeared for the early stages of pilot training. Pilots who were picked to fly fighter or strike aircraft then went on to fly more advanced training aircraft like the Hawker Siddeley Gnat.

As the early jet-trainers became obsolete then further generations have appeared, the British using the single-engine BAE Systems Hawk while the French ordered the Dassault/Dornier Alpha Jet. In the Warsaw Pact the Aero L-39 Albatros became the standard jet trainer.

As the jet trainer developed, it was also used for weapon training, which led to some trainers being modified as light strike aircraft; for example, the Cessna T-37 Tweet was developed into the Cessna A-37 Dragonfly.

Modern jet trainers are structurally strengthened in order to allow high stress maneuvers and aerobatics.

== List of jet trainers ==
Below is a list of some current and former jet trainers

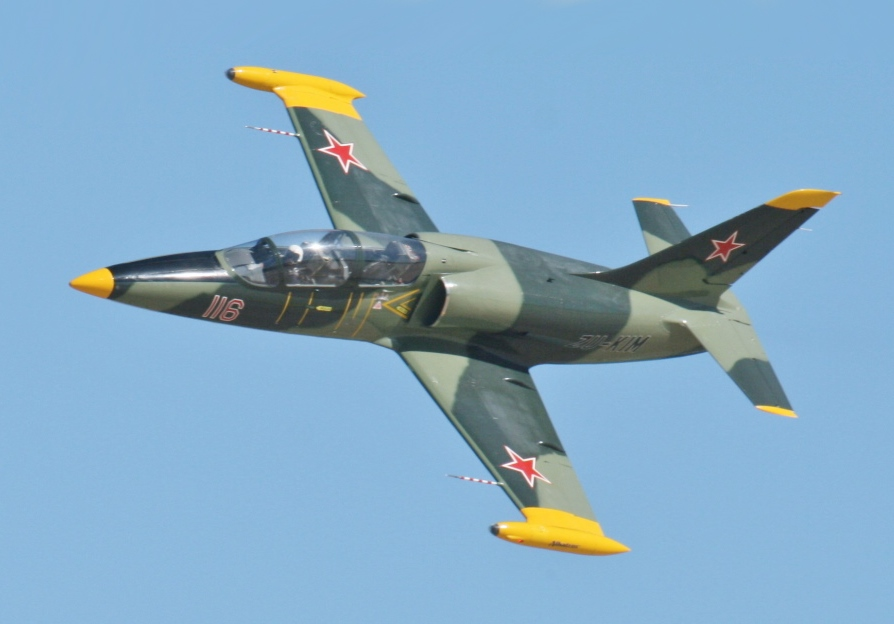
An Aero L-39 Albatros

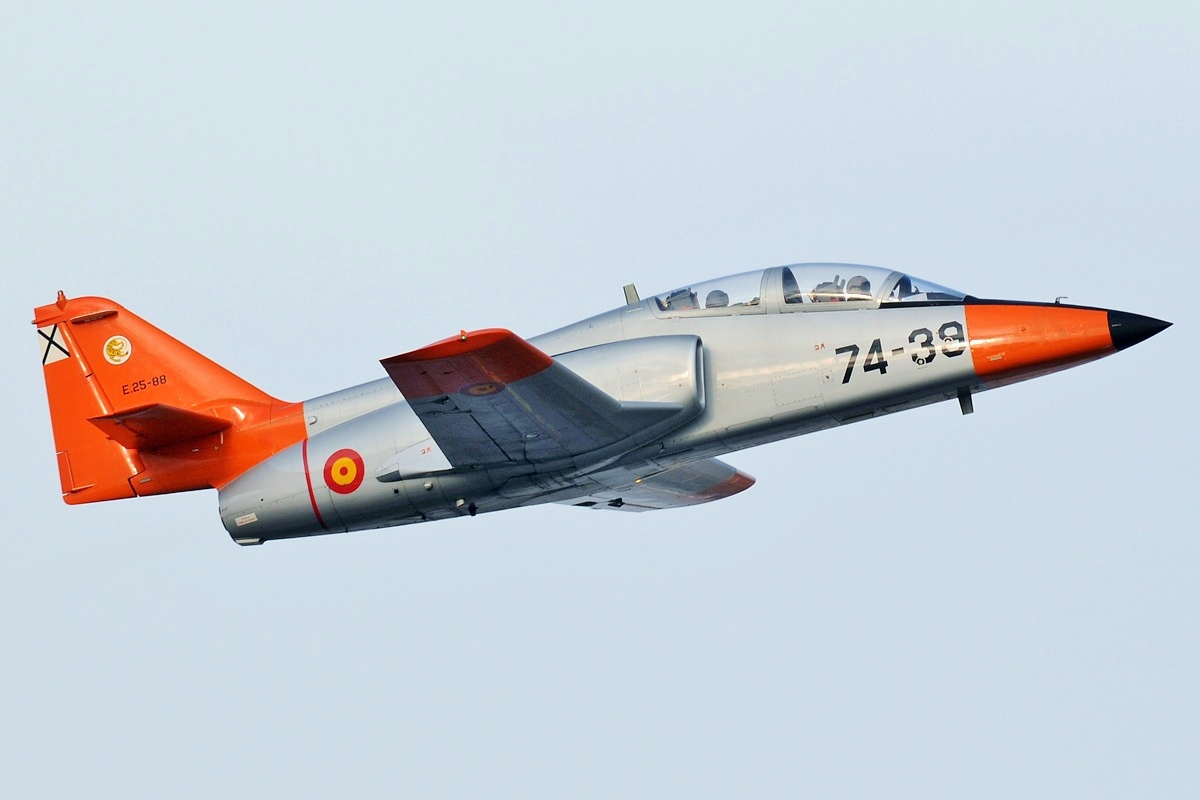
A Spanish Air Force C-101

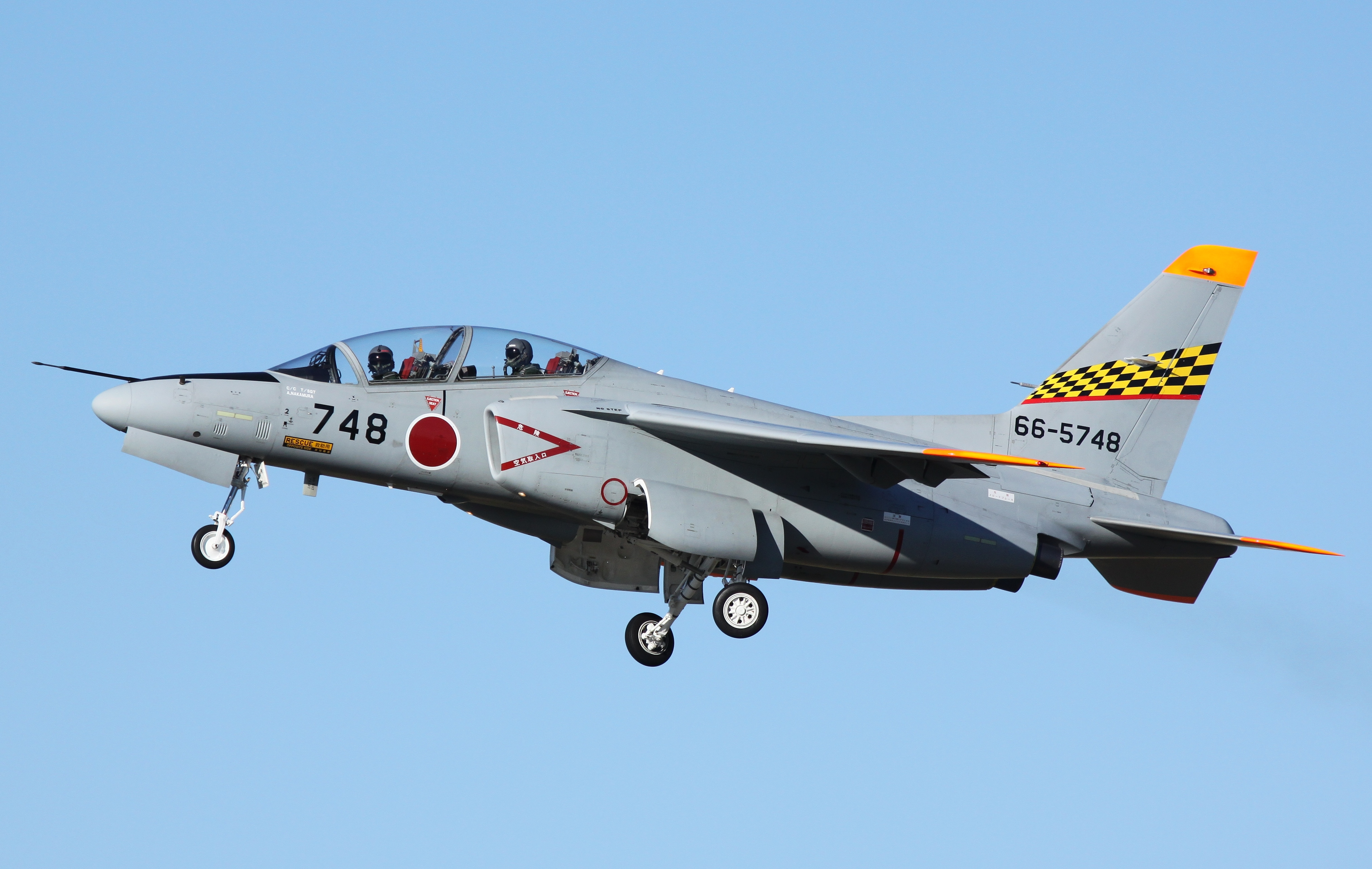
The JASDF Kawasaki T-4

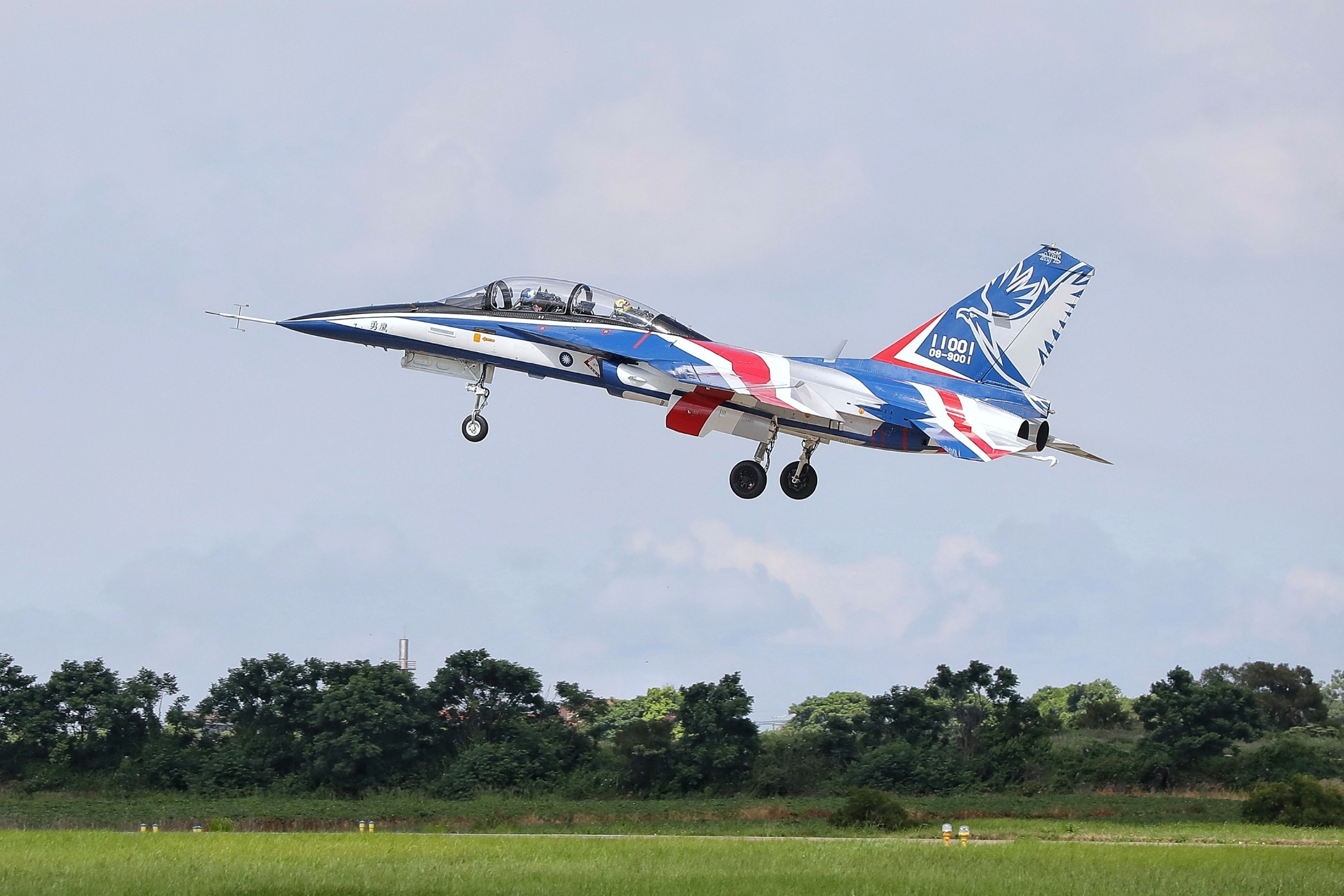
The Republic of China Air Force AIDC T-5 Brave Eagle

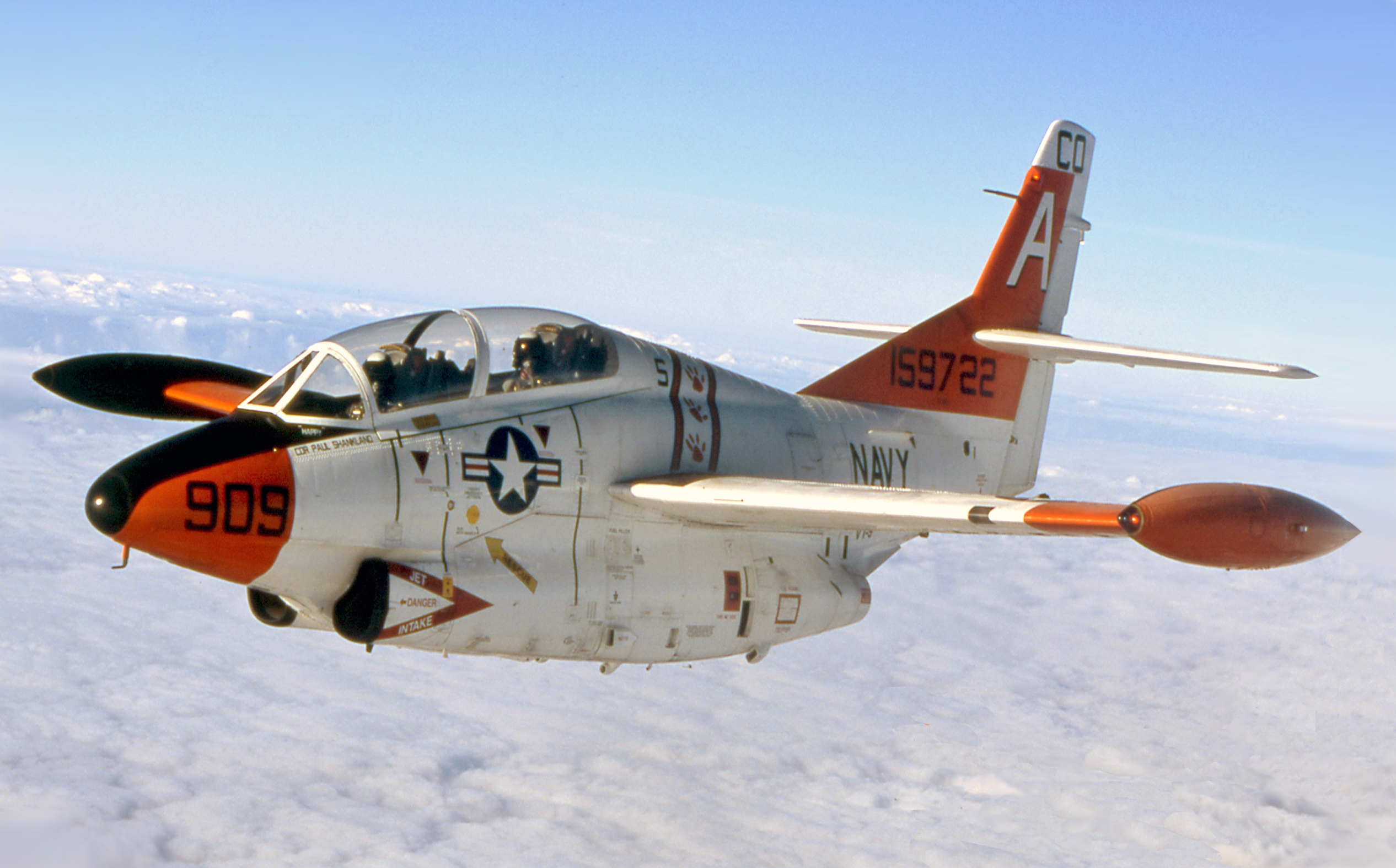
A US Navy T-2 Buckeye

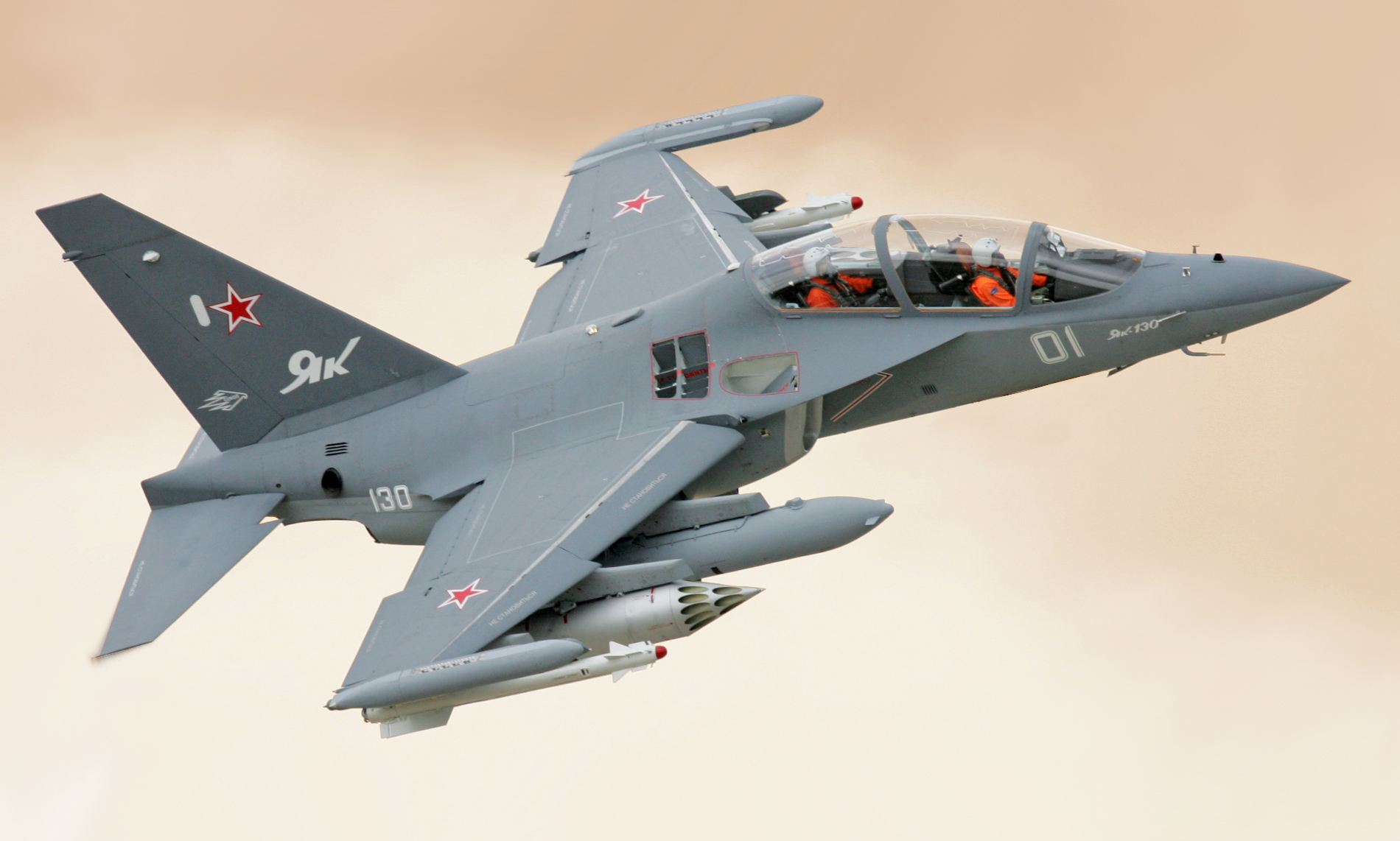
The Yakovlev Yak-130

Aircraft	Country	1st flight	No. built	Status
Aermacchi MB-326	Italy	1957	800	Limited service
Aermacchi MB-339	Italy	1976	230	Operational
Aero L-29 Delfín	Czechoslovakia	1959	3,500	Operational
Aero L-39 Albatros	Czechoslovakia	1968	2,800	Operational
Aero L-39 Skyfox	Czech Republic	2018	10	Operational
Aero L-59 Super Albatros	Czechoslovakia	1986	60	Operational
Aero L-159 ALCA	Czech Republic	1997	72	Operational
AIDC AT-3 Tzu Chung	Republic of China	1980	63	Operational
AIDC T-5 Brave Eagle	Republic of China	2020	5	Operational
BAC Jet Provost	United Kingdom	1954	741	Retired
BAE Hawk	United Kingdom	1974	1,000	Operational
Boeing–Saab T-7 Red Hawk	United States / Sweden	2016	3	In development
CASA C-101	Spain	1977	166	Operational
Canadair CT-133 Silver Star	Canada	1952	656	Retired
Canadair CT-114 Tutor	Canada	1960	212	aircraft in flight for testing and aerobatic demonstrations.
Cessna T-37 Tweet	United States	1954	1,269	Limited service
Dassault/Dornier Alpha Jet	France / Germany	1973	480	Operational
Douglas TA-4E/J Skyhawk	United States	1954	547	Operational
Fiat G.80	Italy	1951	4	Retired
FMA IA 63 Pampa	Argentina	1984	27	Operational
Fokker S.14 Machtrainer	Netherlands	1951	21	Retired
Folland Gnat	United Kingdom	1955	105	Retired
Fouga Magister	France	1952	929	Retired
Fouga Zéphyr	France	1959	32	Retired
Fuji T-1	Japan	1958	66	Retired
Mitsubishi T-2	Japan	1971	90	Retired
Grumman F9F-8T/TF-9J Cougar	United States	1951	400	Retired
HAL HJT-16 Kiran	India	1964	190	Operational
HAL HJT-36 Sitara	India	2003	6	Limited series production
HESA Yasin	Iran	2019	2	In development
Hispano HA-200	Spain	1955	212	Retired
Hongdu JL-8/Karakorum-8	People's Republic of China / Pakistan	1990	700	Operational
Guizhou JL-9	People's Republic of China	2003	20	Operational
Hongdu JL-10	People's Republic of China	2006	100	Operational
IAR 99	Romania	1985	28	Operational
KAI T-50 Golden Eagle	South Korea	2002	200+	Operational
Kawasaki T-4	Japan	1985	208	Operational
Leonardo M-346 Master	Italy	2004	68	Operational
Lockheed T-33	United States	1948	6,557	Retired
Lockheed T2V SeaStar	United States	1953	150	Retired
McDonnell Douglas T-45 Goshawk	United States	1988	221	Operational
Morane-Saulnier MS.760 Paris	France	1964	165	Retired
North American T-2 Buckeye	United States	1959	1,146	Operational
Northrop T-38 Talon	United States	1958	529	Operational
PZL I-22 Iryda	Poland	1985	17	Retired
PZL TS-11 Iskra	Poland	1960	424	Retired
Saab 105	Sweden	1963	192	Retired
Soko G-2 Galeb	Yugoslavia	1961	248	Limited service
Soko G-4 Super Galeb	Yugoslavia	1978	85	Operational
SIAI-Marchetti S.211	Italy	1981	60	Operational
TAI Hürjet	Turkey	2023	2	In development
Temco TT Pinto	United States	1956	15	Retired
Yakovlev Yak-130	Russia	1996	186	Operational
