= Mark Wall (judge) =

British judge (born 1963)

The Honourable Mr Justice Wall
- Royal coat of arms of the United Kingdom

Justice of the High Court
- Incumbent
- Assumed office 1 October 2020
- Monarch: Charles III

Personal details
- Born: 4 March 1963 (age 63) London, England
- Education: St John's College, Cambridge

Sir Mark Arthur Wall (born 4 March 1963), styled The Honourable Mr Justice Wall, is a British High Court judge.

== Early life and education ==
Wall was born in London, England and grew up in Worcestershire. He was educated at King Charles I School in Kidderminster and completed a BA at St John's College, Cambridge in 1984.

== Legal career ==
Wall was called to the bar at Lincoln's Inn in 1985 and developed a practice in criminal law based at Citadel Chambers. He was appointed a recorder in 2002, took silk in 2006, and was leader of the Midland circuit from 2011 to 2014. He was a member of the Bar Council from 2008 to 2014.

In 2013, Wall was appointed a deputy High Court judge in the Administrative Court and was appointed a circuit judge a year later.

On 1 October 2020, Wall was appointed a judge of the High Court, following the promotion of Sir Richard Arnold to the Court of Appeal, and he was assigned to the Queen's Bench Division (now King's Bench Division). He received the customary knighthood in the same year.

Wall's judicial work has primarily focused on serious criminal cases, including homicide, organised crime, firearms offences, terrorism and complex multi-defendant jury trials. Since his appointment to the High Court, he has sat as a judge of the King's Bench Division and is one of the judges assigned to the High Court's Terrorism List, hearing cases involving offences under terrorism legislation as well as other matters engaging national security. He also currently serves as a judicial member of the Sentencing Council for England and Wales, contributing to the development of sentencing guidelines for serious criminal offences.

== Notable cases ==
=== Murder of Arthur Labinjo-Hughes (2021) ===
Wall presided over the trial arising from the murder of six-year-old Arthur Labinjo-Hughes at Coventry Crown Court. In December 2021, the jury convicted Arthur's stepmother, Emma Tustin, of murder and his father, Thomas Hughes, of manslaughter. Wall sentenced Tustin to life imprisonment with a minimum term of 29 years and Hughes to 21 years' imprisonment. The case attracted extensive national media coverage and prompted reviews of child safeguarding arrangements in England.

=== Anjem Choudary Trial (2025) ===
In June 2024, Wall presided over the trial of Anjem Choudary, which was being held at Woolwich Crown Court. Choudary was charged with membership of a proscribed organisation and directing and encouraging support for a proscribed organisation, all contrary to section 56 of the Terrorism Act 2000.

On 23 July 2024, he was found guilty of "directing an organisation concerned with the commission of acts of terrorism" and was the first person in the UK to be convicted of this charge. On 30 July 2024, Wall sentenced Choudary to life imprisonment with a minimum term of 28 years.

=== Manchester mass shooting plot (2025) ===
In December 2025, Wall presided over the trial of Walid Saadaoui, Bilel Saadaoui and Amar Hussein, who plotted to smuggle four Kalashnikov AK-47 rifles, two handguns and ammunition into the United Kingdom in preparation for a mass shooting attack in Manchester. Walid Saadaoui and Hussein were found guilty of preparing acts of terrorism while Bilel Saadaoui was convicted of failing to disclose information about acts of terrorism. They were sentenced in February 2026 at Preston Crown Court.

=== Jagger Strang bomb threat case (2026) ===
In July 2026, Wall sentenced Jagger Strang to three years and ten months' imprisonment after he admitted making a hoax bomb threat against a college in Birmingham. The defendant had falsely claimed that an explosive device had been planted at the campus, resulting in a major emergency response and the evacuation of students and staff. In sentencing, Wall described the offence as causing significant fear and disruption and emphasised the seriousness of public hoax threats.

=== Moog 4 (2026-) ===
The Moog proceedings arose from an August 2025 protest at Moog Inc’s Wolverhampton facility, following NGO and media scrutiny of the company’s alleged role in military aircraft supply chains linked to Israel, including components for the F-35 and Leonardo M-346. Four protesters, later referred to by supporters as the “Moog 4”, were charged with criminal damage after entering the site and allegedly damaging property including roof structures and skylights. The defendants admitted taking part in the action but said they had targeted the facility because they believed Moog supplied components for aircraft used by Israel in Gaza. Moog subsequently obtained a High Court injunction against protest activity at its UK sites, restricting trespass, obstruction and interference with operations. In court filings connected with the injunction, Moog’s General Counsel referred to the possibility that prosecutors would seek a “terrorism connection” at sentencing, under Section 69 of the Sentencing Act 2020, a prospect that attracted concern from campaigners and commentators because no terrorism offence had been charged.

The trial began at Birmingham Crown Court before Mr Justice Wall in June 2026. Prosecutors said the case concerned criminal damage rather than the rights and wrongs of the Israel–Gaza conflict, while the defendants argued that their actions were intended to disrupt the supply of military components and prevent loss of life. After more than 17 hours of deliberation, and following a direction that majority verdicts would be accepted, the jury failed to reach verdicts and was discharged. The defendants were released on bail. At a further hearing on 3 July 2026, the Crown Prosecution Service confirmed that it would seek a retrial. Advocacy organisation CAGE criticised the decision, arguing that the defendants had been denied due process in relation to the “lawful excuse” defence, while the CPS has continued to pursue the prosecution.

The retrial will take place 8 March 2027 with Mr Justice Wall again presiding, and is scheduled to last five days.

== Marriage and children ==
In 1987, Wall married Carmel Adler (a circuit judge). They have a son and a daughter.

== See also ==
- Murder of Arthur Labinjo-Hughes
