= Moog 4 =

British pro-Palestine direct action group

- Court: Birmingham Crown Court

Case history
- Prior actions: First trial, 5-18 June 2026; jury discharged without verdict
- Subsequent action: Retrial scheduled for 5 March 2027

Court membership
- Judge sitting: Mr Justice Wall

Keywords
- Criminal damage in English law, Moog Inc., Direct action, Pro-Palestinian protests, Terrorist connection

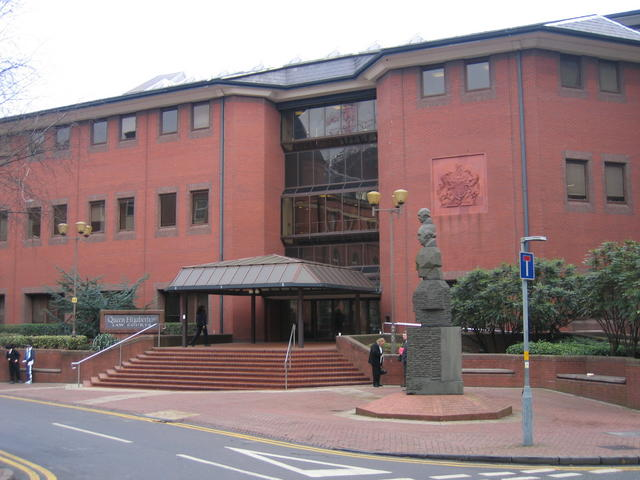
Queen Elizabeth Law Courts

Moog 4 refers to four pro-Palestinian activists, Iain Evans, Hisham Alkhamesi, Frank Sherman and Hana Yun-Stevens. They are awaiting retrial on charges of criminal damage arising from an August 2025 protest at the Wolverhampton factory of Moog Inc., the US aerospace and defence company. Prosecutors allege that the four broke into the factory and caused damage while attempting to disrupt the manufacture of components for military aircraft used by Israel. Their first trial began on 5 June 2026 at Birmingham Crown Court. After more than 17 hours of deliberations, the jury was unable to reach a verdict and was discharged. The Crown Prosecution Service subsequently sought a retrial, which is scheduled to begin on 5 March 2027 at Birmingham Crown Court.

== Background ==
=== Moog Inc.'s activities ===
Moog Inc. is an American-based designer and manufacturer of electric, electro-hydraulic and hydraulic motion, controls and systems for applications in aerospace, defense, industrial and medical devices. The company operates under four segments: aircraft controls, space and defense controls, industrial controls, and components. Moog is headquartered in Elma, New York, and has sales, engineering, and manufacturing facilities in twenty-six countries.

Moog's military aircraft division specialises in actuation, flight control systems, avionics and electro-optics and supplies many of the leading defense prime contractors including Boeing, Lockheed Martin, Bell Textron, Leonardo S.p.A. and BAE Systems.

Some of the military aircraft programs that Moog supplies include:

- Lockheed Martin F-35
- F-15 Eagle
- General Dynamics F-16 Fighting Falcon
- Northrop B-2 Spirit
- Leonardo M-346

=== Bribery and corruption charges ===
In October 2024, the U.S. Securities and Exchange Commission announced that Moog Inc. had agreed to settle charges under the U.S. Foreign Corrupt Practices Act (FCPA) relating to conduct by its wholly owned Indian subsidiary, Moog Motion Controls Private Limited. According to the SEC, between 2020 and 2022 employees of the subsidiary paid bribes to Indian government officials to secure business and influence public tenders, including through the use of third-party agents and distributors.

According to the SEC, Moog Motion Control (MMCPL) had a "prevailing culture to win business at any cost, including improper means. The widespread misconduct at MMCPL reflected a breakdown in internal accounting controls, training, compliance, and tone at the top of the subsidiary."

The SEC found that the payments were improperly recorded as legitimate business expenses and that Moog had violated the FCPA’s books and records and internal accounting controls provisions. Without admitting or denying the findings, Moog agreed to cease and desist from further violations and to pay approximately $1.7 million, including a $1.1 million civil penalty and approximately $600,000 in disgorgement and interest.

Shortly after the Moog FCPA settlement was announced, in February 2025, President Trump signed an executive order directing Pam Bondi, the US attorney-general, to pause enforcement of FCPA. Trump told journalists who were present when he signed the order that “It’s going to mean a lot more business for America”.

=== Moog's Wolverhampton factory ===
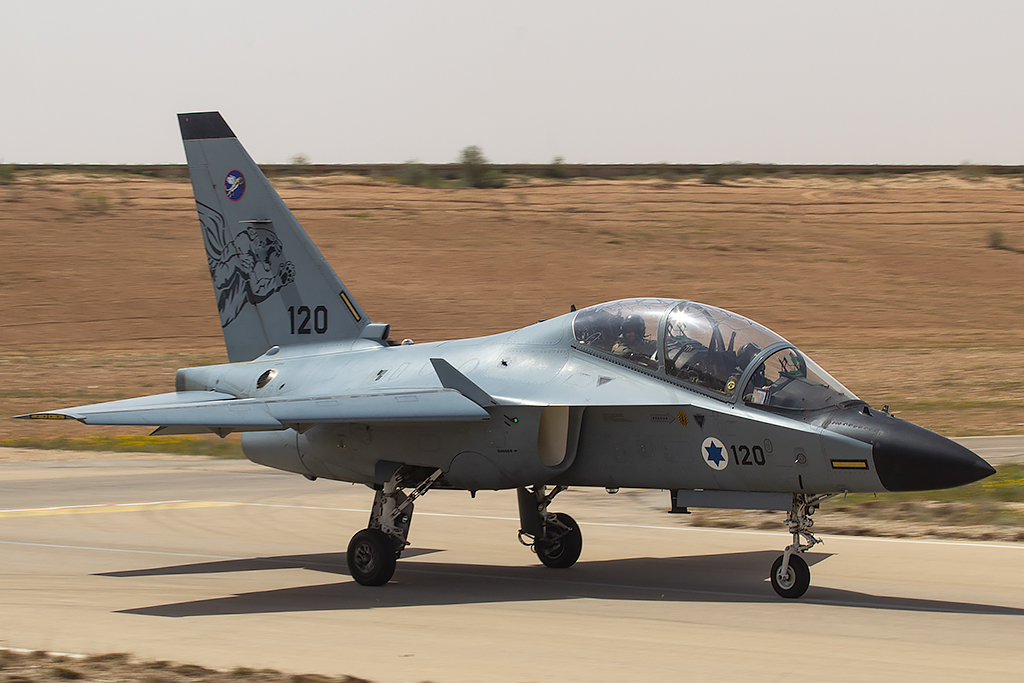
Israeli Air Force M-346 Lavi

Moog's Wolverhampton facility manufactures flight-control systems for military aircraft, including the Leonardo M-346 advanced jet trainer and the F-35 fighter aircraft. Moog has stated that its Wolverhampton operation designed the M-346's primary flight-control actuation system and is the original equipment manufacturer for the system.

The Israeli Air Force operates 30 M-346 aircraft, known in Israeli service as the Lavi, from Hatzerim Airbase. The aircraft are used to train pilots who subsequently operate frontline combat aircraft. In July 2025, Declassified UK reported that Moog had made multiple shipments from its Wolverhampton facility to Hatzerim for the Israeli M-346 programme. The report said that the shipments continued after the UK government's September 2024 suspension of certain arms export licences to Israel; the suspension did not extend to components for trainer aircraft.

Subsequently, in April 2026 Declassified UK reported that an internal Foreign Office briefing from October 2025 described the M-346 as being "used to train IAF fast-jet pilots" and as facilitating "the development of an offensive capability". The report contrasted this assessment with the government's justification for excluding trainer aircraft components from the 2024 licence suspensions, under which such components were assessed as having no combat utility in Gaza.

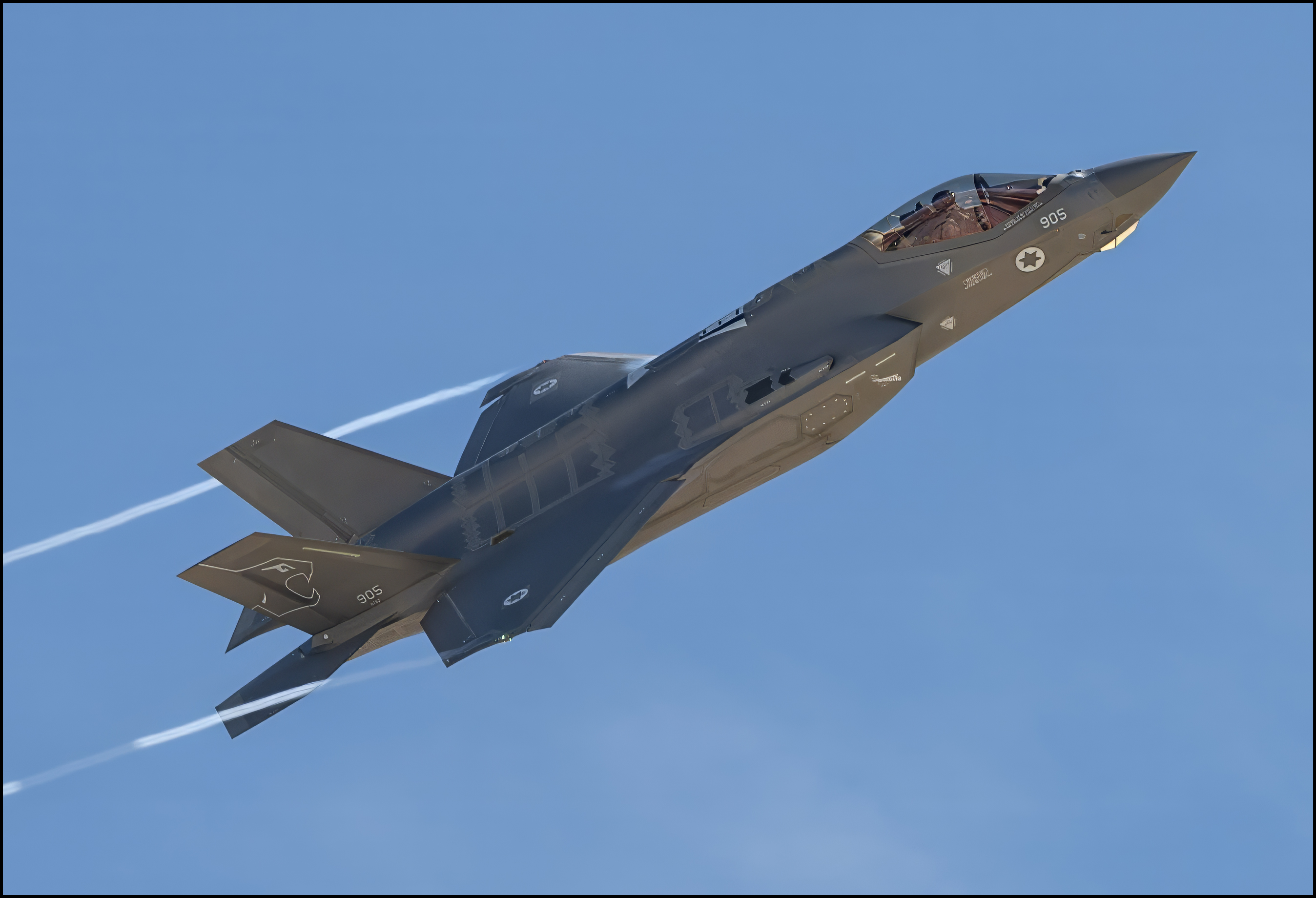
Israeli Air Force (IAF) F-35I Adir

Moog also manufactures components for the F-35 programme at Wolverhampton. In 2019, the company announced contracts worth more than $400 million to manufacture primary flight-control, leading-edge flap-drive and wing-fold actuation systems for the F-35, with production divided between Wolverhampton and the company's facility in Elma, New York. In November 2024, the Campaign Against Arms Trade identified Moog Wolverhampton as one of the British facilities involved in the supply chain for F-35 aircraft operated by Israel.

== August 2025 protest ==
On 26 August 2025, Iain Evans, Hisham Alkhamesi, Frank Sherman and Hana Yun-Stevens entered Moog's Wolverhampton facility and occupied the roof of a building. The four described themselves online as "Palestinian Martyrs' Justice". Prosecutors subsequently alleged that they caused damage to the site, including to roof structures and skylights. The protesters said that they had targeted the factory because it manufactured components for military aircraft used by Israel, including the F-35.

Staffordshire Police arrested all four at the site. They appeared at Stafford Magistrates' Court on 28 August, where they were charged with criminal damage and remanded in custody.

The action took place against the background of controversy over British participation in the F-35 supply chain. In September 2024, the British government had suspended around 30 arms export licences for use in Israel after concluding that there was a clear risk that certain exports might be used to commit or facilitate serious violations of international humanitarian law, but excluded components supplied through the multinational F-35 programme from the suspension. In June 2025, the High Court rejected a legal challenge seeking to prevent the continued export of F-35 components.

Following the protest, Lord Walney, the government's former independent adviser on political violence and disruption, called on the Home Secretary to consider using powers under the Terrorism Act 2000 against groups which he said were continuing the activities of Palestine Action, which had been proscribed the previous month.

== Subsequent events ==
=== Civil injunction ===
In September 2025, Moog applied for and obtained a High Court injunction restricting protest activity at several of its facilities in the United Kingdom.

In October, Moog returned to the High Court and obtained a wider injunction which prohibited protesters from obstructing access to its sites and extended restrictions to areas of public land around them. Declassified UK reported that its earlier investigation into shipments from Wolverhampton to Israel was referred to 44 times in witness statements submitted by Moog in support of the injunction. According to the report, Moog had also consulted Staffordshire Police after Declassified approached the company for comment about the shipments. Tom Southerden, Amnesty International UK's law and human rights director, criticised the use of such injunctions, arguing that the threat of substantial civil penalties could have a deterrent effect on lawful protest.

=== Belgian seizure and criminal investigation into Moog shipments ===
In April 2026, Belgian authorities intercepted military-related equipment at Liège Airport that had originated in the United Kingdom and was travelling to Israel on Challenge Airlines. Belgian media reported that the cargo was inspected after concerns were raised that it contained controlled military items and that a criminal investigation had been opened to determine whether export-control or transit regulations had been breached.

The interception followed information provided to the Belgian authorities by researchers and campaigners who had analysed shipping records, export-control information and other material. Quakers in Britain subsequently reported that a Walloon government spokesperson had confirmed that the initial complaint concerned Moog. The organisation said that one of the researchers involved was a British Quaker with a professional background in risk management.

Adrien Dolimont, the Minister-President of Wallonia, said that no transit licence had been requested for the shipment and that, had one been requested, it would have been refused. Belgian officials subsequently identified the original complaint as concerning a shipment from Moog's Wolverhampton facility destined for Israel's M-346 programme.

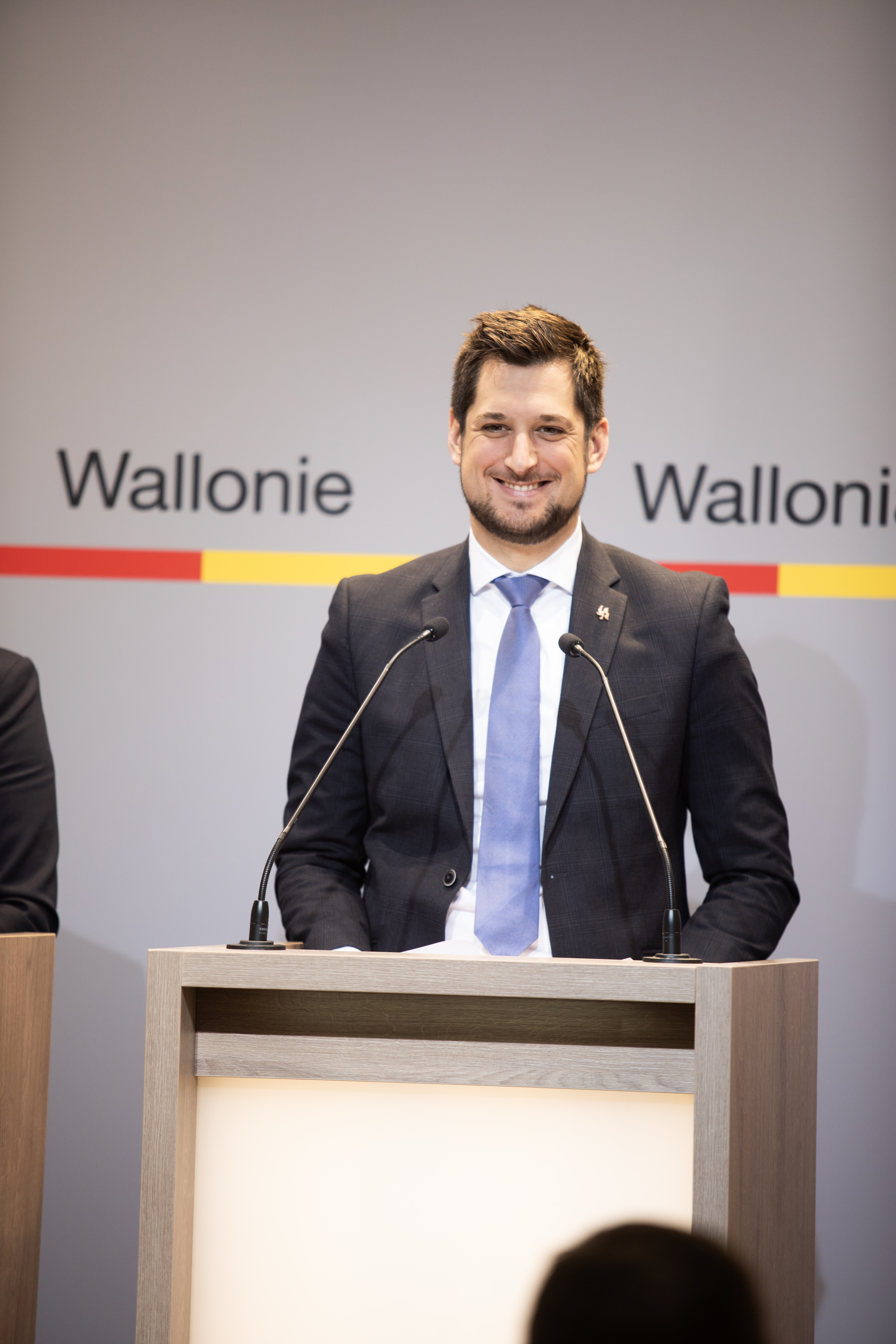
Adrien Dolimont, Minister-President of Wallonia

In a further statement to the Wallonian Parliament in July 2026, Minister-President Adrien Dolimont formally named Moog's shipment as being under criminal investigation (file number 26HUM14) by the Public Prosecutor, and noted that Moog had still not contacted the Belgian or Wallonian authorities concerning the matter.

In July 2026, the case was raised in the Parliament of Wallonia, where Ecolo member Freddy Mockel described the shipment as containing ML5 and ML10 military equipment from Moog Wolverhampton for which no Walloon transit licence had been requested. In response, Walloon Minister-President Adrien Dolimont confirmed that the incident involved Moog and said that neither Moog nor its freight forwarder had submitted an application to regularise the shipment. He stated that, after the expiry of the 90-day period permitted for non-EU goods in temporary storage, the goods were in an irregular customs situation requiring intervention by the customs authorities.

In May 2026, Private Eye reported that Moog had continued to send M-346 components from Wolverhampton to Israel after the Liège interception, including on flights which passed through Belgian airspace. The magazine questioned whether these flights complied with a January 2026 Belgian decree restricting the transit of military materiel destined for the Israeli armed forces.

In June 2026, British MP John McDonnell submitted a written question to the Minister of Trade asking whether his Department planned to conduct a compliance investigation into the companies involved in the seizures. Minister for Trade Chris Bryant responded that this was "a matter for the Belgian authorities."

On 9 June, the Campaign Against Arms Trade launched a campaign calling for the suspension and review of licences covering Moog's exports to Israel and for an investigation into the continued export of components for the M-346 programme.

On 15 June, 61 MPs and several members of the House of Lords wrote to Business Secretary Peter Kyle seeking information about the government's knowledge of the Belgian interception, communications between the government, Moog and the Belgian authorities, and whether the relevant export licences would be reviewed.

Subsequently, in November 2026, investigative outlet The Intercept reported that Challenge Airlines had been transporting extensive volumes of components for bombs and munitions from the United States to Israel via John F. Kennedy International Airport. According to the article, parts for BLU-109 2,000 lb bombs and precision guidance kits for Joint Direct Attack Munitions, or JDAMs, had been shipped over an 18-month period from December 2024 to June 2026.

== First trial at Birmingham Crown Court ==
The four defendants had been remanded in custody after being charged in August 2025. At a hearing at the Old Bailey on 27 February 2026, all four pleaded not guilty to criminal damage, appearing by video link from custody. Mrs Justice Cheema-Grubb granted them bail subject to conditions, including a £10,000 surety.

The first criminal trial began at Birmingham Crown Court on 5 June 2026 and was presided over by Mr Justice Wall. Press commentary before the trial raised concerns that the defendants, if found guilty, would potentially face being sentenced as terrorists under the Section 69 terrorist connection provisions of the Sentencing Act.

Advocacy group CAGE International highlighted the fact that the defendants had already spent six months on remand before their trial had begun, as well as the fact that the UK Foreign Office had itself admitted that Moog's M-346 export to Israel "facilitated its offensive capability" and that Moog Wolverhampton's shipments to Israel were currently under criminal investigation in Belgium.

During the trial, the jury heard from the prosecution that the four defendants were all pro-Palestinian protesters who believed that Moog was involved in the supply chain to Israel, but that the case was "not about the rights and wrongs of the Arab-Israeli conflict" and was simply a question of whether their actions amounted to criminal damage. The prosecution conceded their motivation was not in dispute and that the defendants had not set out to harm anyone and had not been reckless but that "smashing up a business because you don't agree with what they do is not a lawful excuse".

In evidence, the defendants admitted climbing onto the factory roof but said that their primary intention had been to disrupt its operations rather than to cause criminal damage. Yun-Stevens described direct action as "going to the source of production and disrupting it", while Alkhamesi said that the group's "main intention" had been to occupy the roof because the factory could not operate while they remained there. Evans, who had previously worked in the aerospace industry, told the court that the group believed that disrupting production would have an immediate effect on Moog's supply chain.

According to Evans, they had chosen a bank holiday as there would be no night shift and "we didn't want to potentially cause harm to anyone". Yun-Stevens added that footage of them on the roof had been posted to social media because the activists "wanted people to know what the factory was doing", and that they wanted to be arrested and have a trial to determine the criminality of their actions, claiming that they had deemed the factory's operations to be "criminal".

During the jury's deliberations, several members of the jury passed notes to the judge. One set of questions was why the defendants had been denied a lawful excuse, why they were not permitted to talk about their reasons for taking action against Moog, and whether the judge could provide some examples of what would constitute a lawful excuse. The judge declined to answer, stating the questions were not relevant to the issues at hand that the jury was being asked to decide.

Sherman chose to deliver their own closing statement rather than have counsel address the jury on their behalf. They argued that the action had been undertaken with care and without personal gain and maintained that disrupting what the defendants regarded as unlawful activity was not itself criminal. Counsel for the other defendants emphasised that their motivation was not disputed by the prosecution and referred to the historic independence of juries.

On 18 June, after more than 17 hours of deliberation, the jury was unable to return verdicts on which the required majority could agree and was discharged.

The Crown Prosecution Service subsequently confirmed that it would seek a retrial, which was scheduled for 5 March 2027, again at Birmingham Crown Court under Mr Justice Wall.

== See also ==
- Gaza genocide
- United Kingdom and the Gaza war
- Gaza war protests in the United Kingdom
- Seeds of Hope – English plowshares group
- Pitstop Ploughshares
