= T-X program =

US Air Force advanced trainer acquisition program

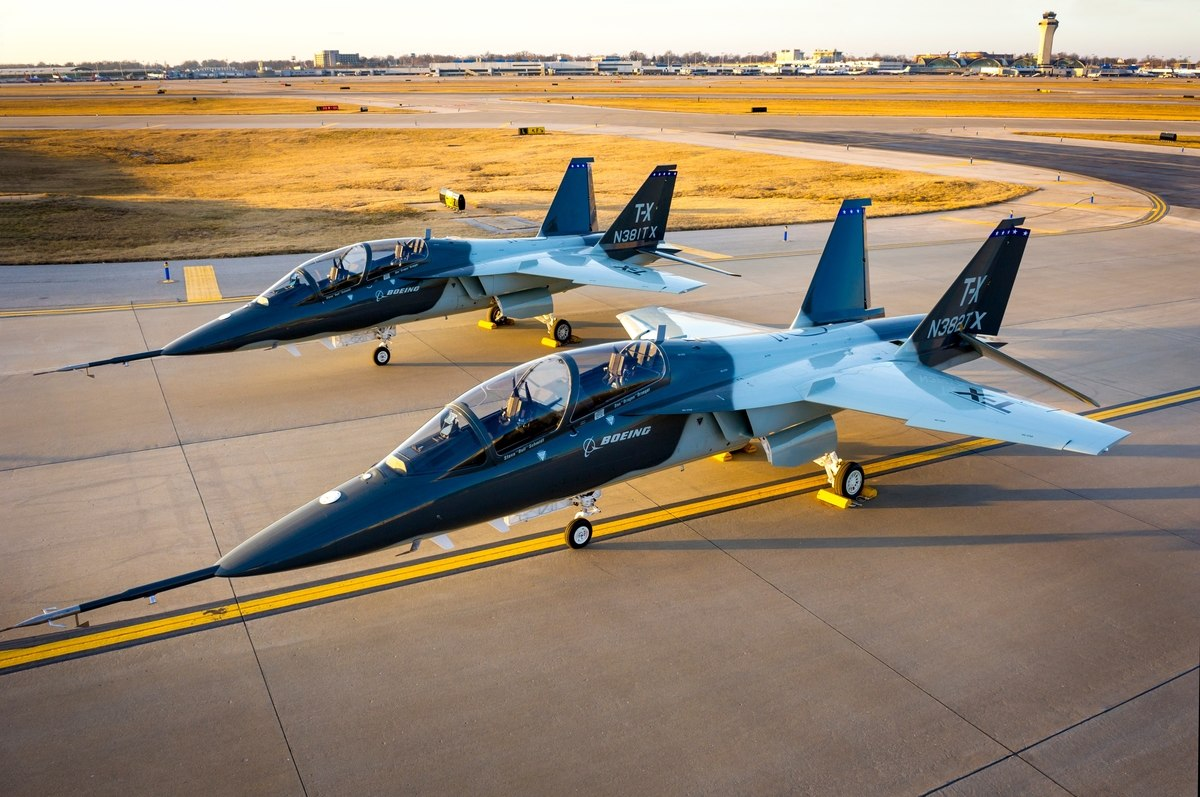
- Two Boeing-Saab T-7 Red Hawk aircraft

General information
- Project for: Fast-jet trainer
- Issued by: United States Air Force
- Proposals: Boeing/Saab T-X; Leonardo T-100; Lockheed Martin/KAI T-50A
- Requirement: Advanced Pilot Training System

History
- Initiated: 20 March 2015
- Concluded: 27 September 2018
- Outcome: Boeing/Saab T-X selected for production as the T-7 Red Hawk

The T-X program is a United States Air Force development and acquisition program for a new two-seat jet trainer to replace the Northrop T-38 Talon. On 27 September 2018, the US Air Force selected the Boeing/Saab T-X entry to become its trainer aircraft. The new aircraft was given the designation and name "T-7 Red Hawk" in September 2019. The Air Force's initial plan is to purchase 351 T-7s, and has an option to purchase up to 475.

== History ==
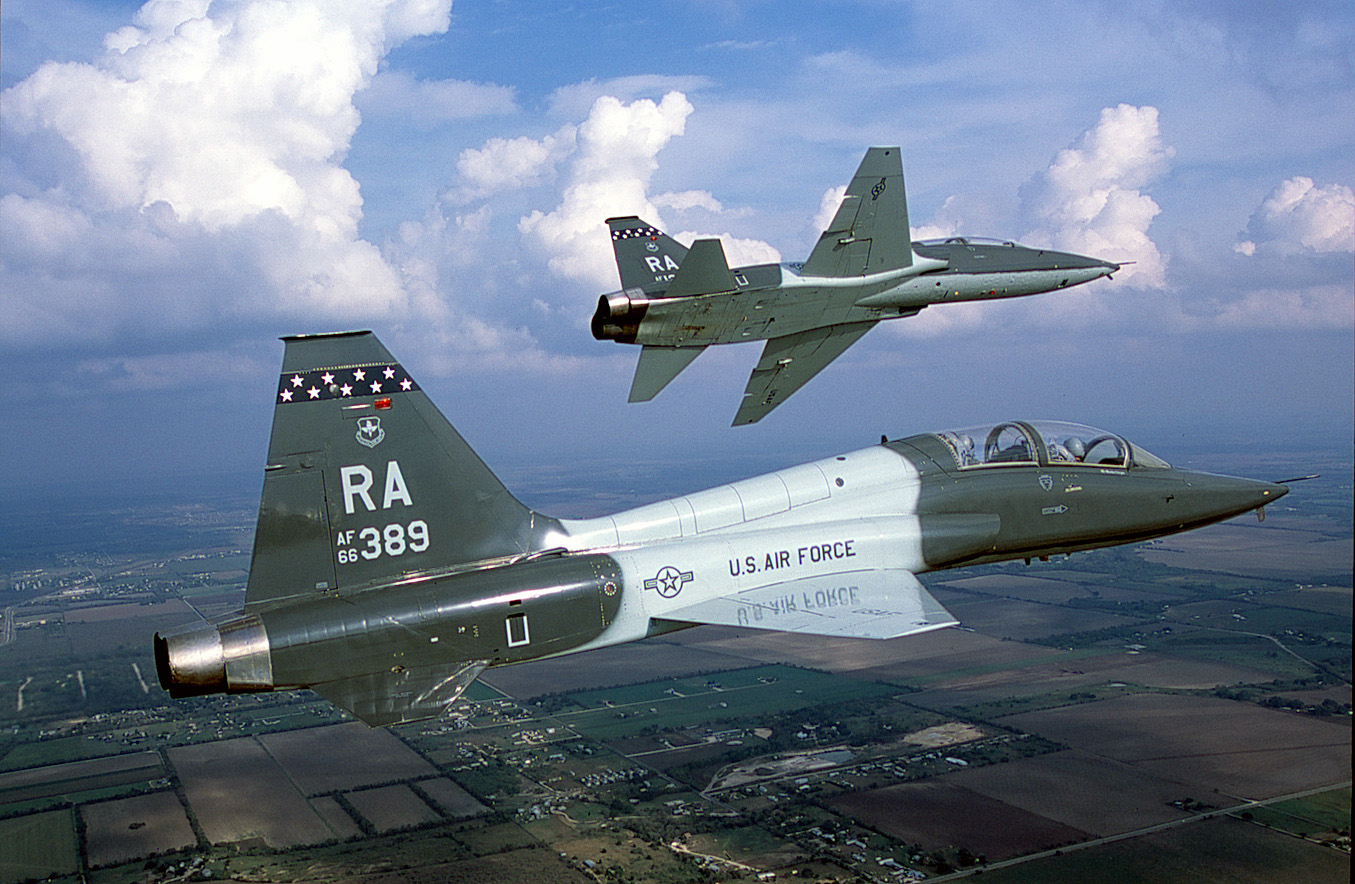
A USAF Northrop T-38 Talon from the 560th Flying Training Squadron. The T-38 is to be replaced as the USAF advanced jet trainer by the T-X program winner, the Boeing T-X, now known as the T-7 Red Hawk.

The USAF's Air Education and Training Command (AETC) began developing the requirements for a replacement for the Northrop T-38 Talon as early as 2003. The average age of the T-38 fleet is over 50 years, and a fatigue failure in 2008 killed the two-person crew of a T-38C. Originally, the replacement trainer was expected to enter service around 2020, but the Air Force advanced the target date to 2017. In the Fiscal 2013 budget proposal, the USAF suggested delaying the initial operating capability to FY2020 with the contract award not expected before FY2016. Shrinking budgets and the need to fund higher priority modernization projects pushed the full implementation of the yet-to-be-selected T-X aircraft to "fiscal year 2023 or 2024". Although the program was left out of the FY 2014 budget entirely, the service still viewed the trainer as a priority.

In February 2013, there was an expectation that the program might succumb to budget pressures in the USAF. In May 2013, the T-X industry day was postponed "until further notice" due to the fiscal climate. In December 2013 the head of the program said there were no plans for 2014 or 2015, but that he would speak to the chief of staff about the program either in February 2014 or later.

On 20 March 2015, the US Air Force released the T-X program requirements. On 30 December 2016, the US Air Force released a formal request for proposals. The request includes 350 aircraft and initial operational capability by 2024. On 27 September 2018, the U.S. Air Force officially selected the Boeing T-X entry as its new advanced jet trainer to replace the T-38.

== Requirements ==
One of the driving requirements for the new trainer will be to help prepare pilots for the increased complexity in some areas, particularly information management, that are a part of fifth generation jet fighters like the F-22 Raptor and the F-35 Lightning II. The Air Force first viewed this as unnecessary and costly, but industry analysis showed it to be cheaper in the long run. The aircraft and simulation system will have to fulfill several basic training roles; basic aircraft control, airmanship, formation, instrument and navigation, advanced air-to-air, advanced air-to-ground, and advanced crew/cockpit resource management. Furthermore, there are five advanced training roles that the system is expected to fulfill; sustained high-G operations at 6.5–7.5g, aerial refueling, night vision imaging systems operations, air-to-air intercepts, and data-link operations. The 2009 Request For Information (RFI) mentions that some tasks, such as aerial refueling, may be performed in the simulator and not on the aircraft itself. Aircraft availability is to be 80%, but not higher, as that would drive cost too high. Program requirements focus on life-cycle costs rather than just purchase price.

Additionally, while the RFI is specifically for a USAF trainer, it asked potential suppliers about the feasibility of a fighter/attack variant of the aircraft and a carrier-capable variant for the United States Navy. However, the requirements manager for the program, Stephan Lyon, has stated that it is unlikely that potential combat performance will be considered. Similarly, while Navy officials will be participating in some stages of the program, carrier suitability will not be part of the evaluation. Similarly, the Air Force considered the possibility of adapting the T-X aircraft to perform light attack and close air support as part of their effort to retire the A-10 Thunderbolt II. With the T-X already invested in, making it a multirole combat and training plane could defray costs of developing a new attack jet that can operate efficiently in a low-threat environment. However, by 2016 the Air Force decided to pursue other aircraft to meet CAS requirements and not "dilute" the trainer program to support other missions.

== Competitors ==
Several competitors submitted existing aircraft and others proposed all-new designs. The following were submitted as bids: Leonardo S.p.A. with the M-346-based T-100, Korea Aerospace Industries and Lockheed Martin with the T-50 Golden Eagle, Boeing and Saab Group new, purpose-built Boeing T-X, and Sierra Nevada Corporation and Turkish Aerospace Industries with a new design.

=== Boeing–Saab T-X (T-7 Red Hawk) ===
On 6 December 2013, Boeing and Saab Group announced they would team up to offer a new aircraft (Boeing T-X) for the T-X program. On 22 August 2016, Boeing publicly revealed first pictures of the T-X concept. The single-engine, twin-tail aircraft was presented to the public on 13 September. The aircraft was first flown on 20 December 2016.

=== Leonardo T-100 ===
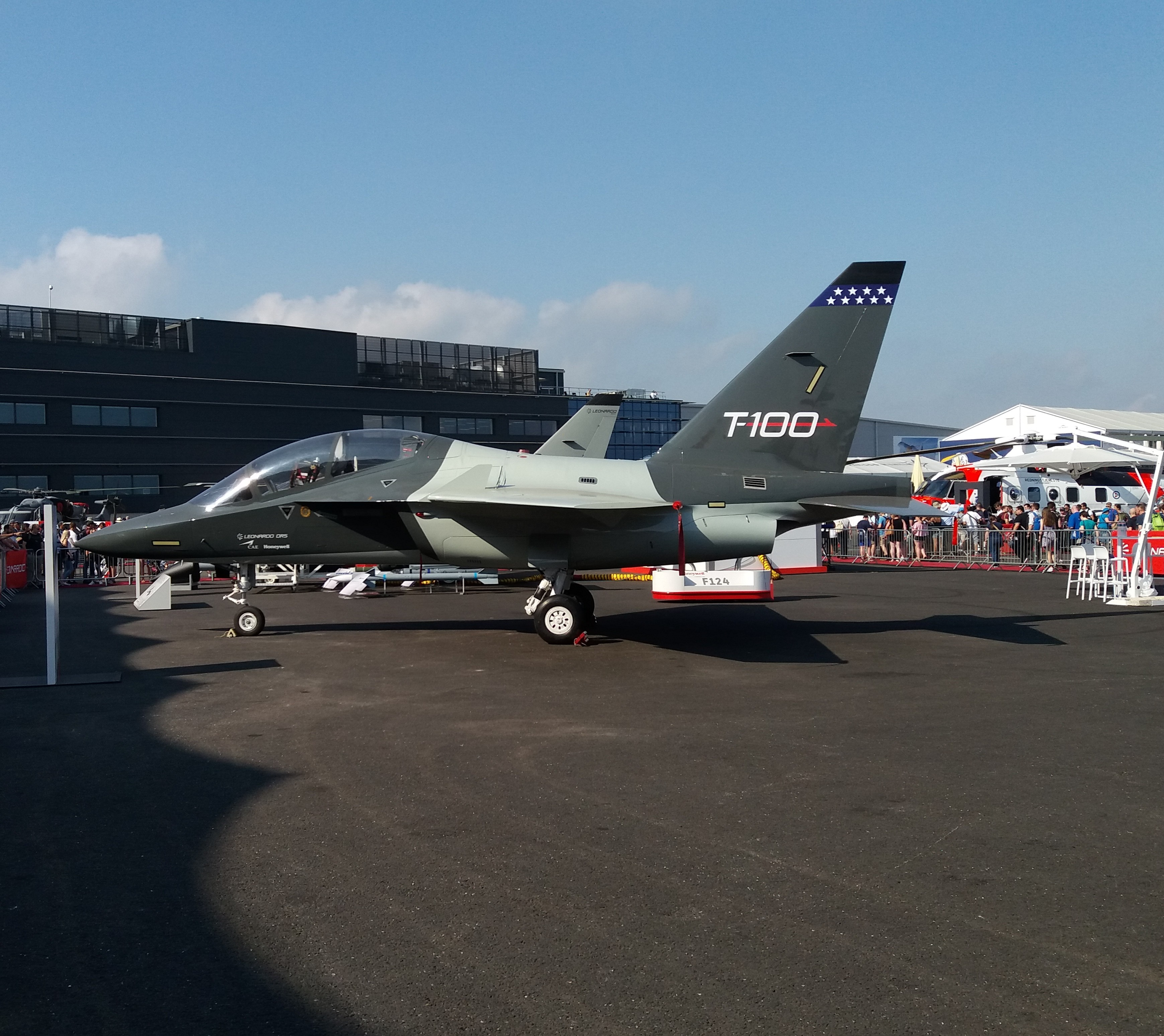
T-100 at the Farnborough Airshow in 2018

Italian aerospace company Leonardo S.p.A. (formerly Alenia Aermacchi) is part of a bid with its M-346 Master. The company had initially considered submitting the aircraft as the prime contractor, but changed its mind in 2010. The company is offering a variant of the aircraft as the "Leonardo DRS T-100 Integrated Training System" for the competition. Alenia anticipates moving the final assembly location from Italy to the United States if it wins the competition. In January 2013, General Dynamics joined Alenia Aermacchi and signed a letter of intent (LOI) to compete jointly on the program. In February 2014, CAE Inc., which specializes in flight simulators and flight training, joined General Dynamics and Alenia Aermacchi to offer the T-100 for the T-X program. On 26 March 2015, General Dynamics withdrew as the prime contractor for the M-346 Master/T-100 offering. General Dynamics would no longer retain its role as the lead contractor and systems integrator for the bid.

Alenia Aermacchi which had been a subsidiary to a holding company Finmeccanica, was taken over completely on 1 January 2016 and renamed Leonardo in 2017. On 22 February 2016, Raytheon announced it was replacing General Dynamics and going to head-up the bid in the US for the T-X program, as the primary contractor, teamed with Leonardo, Honeywell Aerospace, and CAE USA Inc. The aircraft to be submitted would be a modified M-346 platform, named T-100, using two Honeywell/ITEC F124 low-bypass turbofan engines. On January 25, 2017, Raytheon announced its withdrawal from the T-X program, leaving Leonardo without a partner in the program.

On 8 February 2017, Leonardo announced its return to the T-X competition, proposing the T-100 with its American subsidiary, Leonardo DRS, as the prime contractor. Leonardo DRS will be supported by CAE USA in the design and development of the T-100 Ground-Based Training System (GBTS). Honeywell will also provide twin F124 turbofan propulsion engines. The aircraft is to be built at a new 750-employee manufacturing facility at Moton Field in Tuskegee, Alabama.

=== Lockheed Martin–KAI T-50 Golden Eagle ===
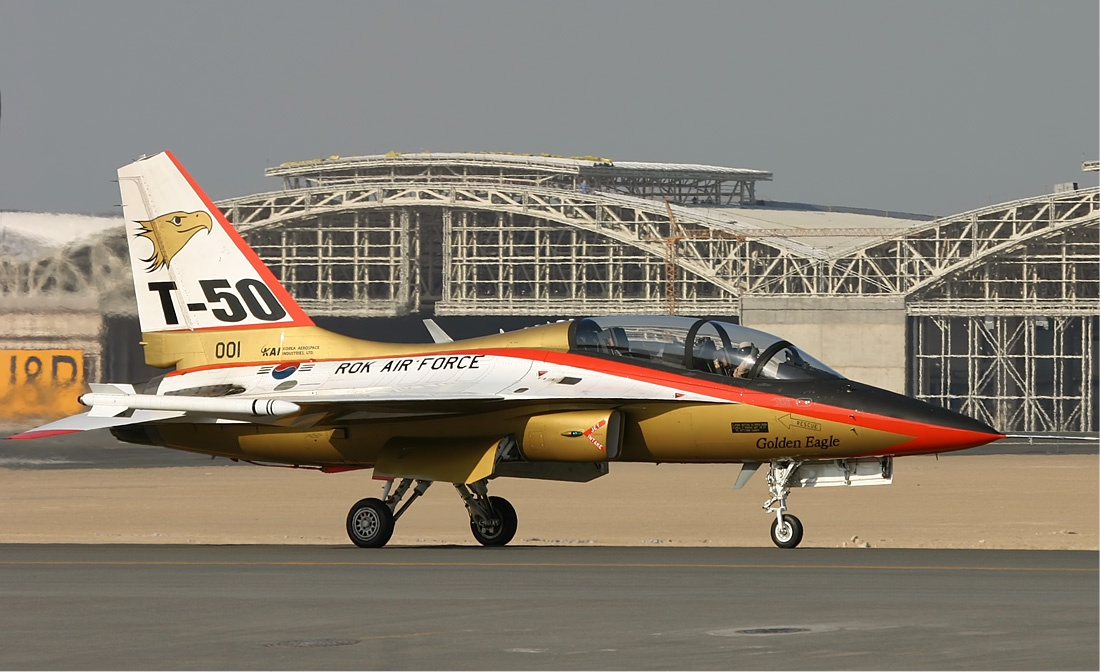
T-50 Golden Eagle

Lockheed Martin and Korea Aerospace Industries (KAI) proposed their T-50 Golden Eagle, which first flew in 2002, for the T-X program. While the T-50 was explicitly designed and built for the South Korean trainer requirement, Lockheed Martin officials acknowledged that the aircraft was designed with replacing the T-38 in mind. Hence, the Defense Department reserved the T-50A designation for the KAI T-50 in hopes of not creating confusion between two "T-50" trainers by allocating T-50 to an unrelated trainer aircraft. Lockheed anticipated proposing the T-50 with few changes, mostly avionics related. Plans were in place to build a new assembly line in the United States for manufacturing the T-50 for the United States Air Force instead of manufacturing them in South Korea, should the Lockheed Martin/KAI team win the contract.

On 17 December 2015, Lockheed and KAI revealed their T-X prototype in South Korea based on the T-50, the first competitor in the program to do so publicly. Referred to as the "T-X demonstrator aircraft", it adds to the T-50 airframe the ability for aerial refueling, embedded ground training systems, and a large area display in place of the five smaller screens. South Korean president Park Geun-hye attended the rollout ceremony. Lockheed Martin's upgraded T-50A jet trainer successfully completed its first flight test in June 2016 in Sacheon, South Korea, a key milestone for the aircraft. Flight tests in the U.S. should begin in 2017. As a line replaceable unit, the aircraft can have an optional large dorsal hump, which houses the aerial refueling receptacle.

=== Northrop Grumman–BAE Systems ===
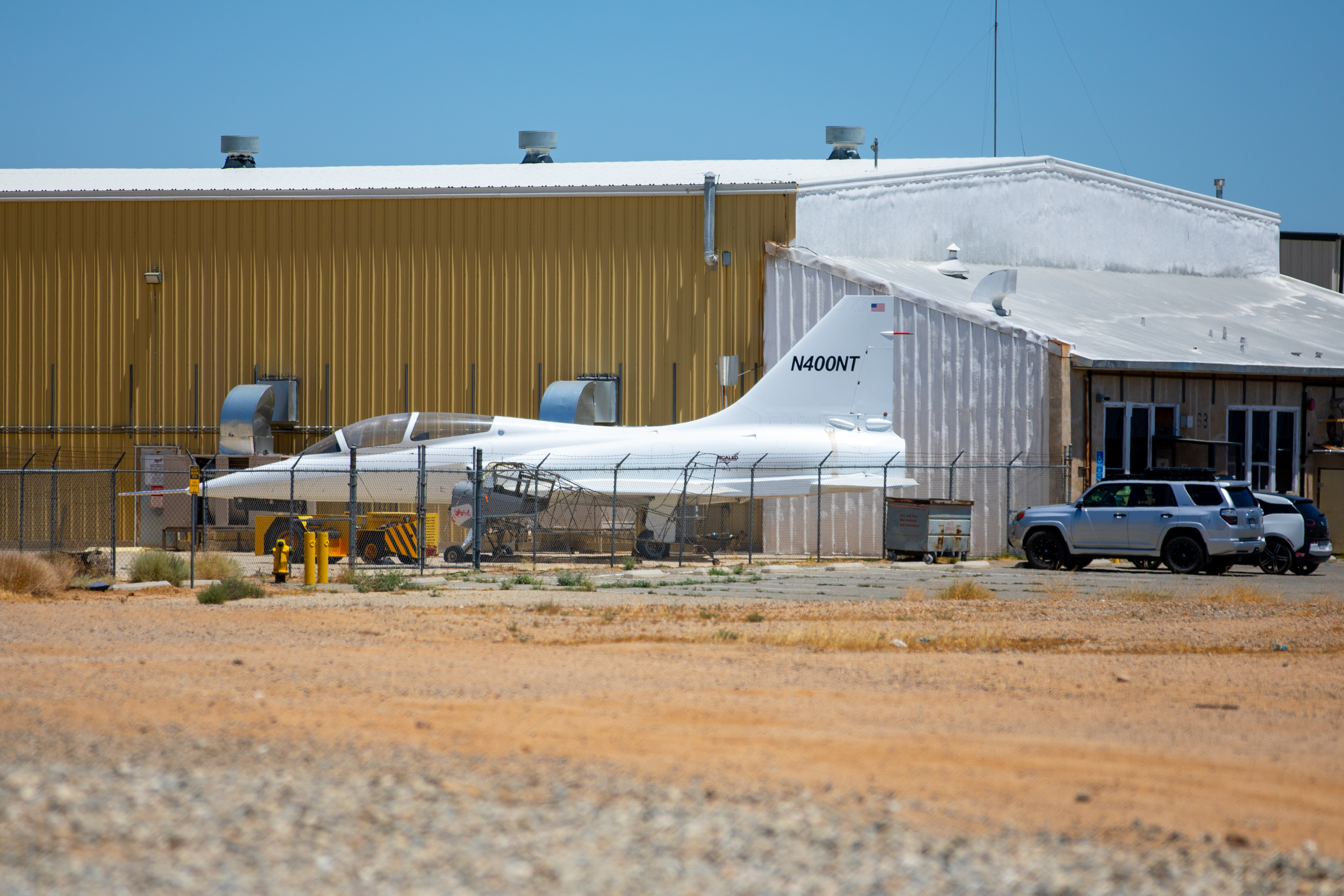
Scaled Composites Model 400

Northrop Grumman with partners BAE Systems, L-3 Communications, and Rolls-Royce Holdings, initially had intentions of proposing an updated version of the Hawk T2/128 for the T-X program. Northrop Grumman assumed prime responsibilities for the team in 2014. Northrop built the U.S. Air Force's current training aircraft, the T-38 Talon.

The Hawk T2 features an all glass cockpit, new wing, and fuselage components. Although the basic Hawk design dates back to the 1970s, the only parts shared between the T1 and T2 versions are the canopy and airbrake, making the T2 version essentially a new aircraft. The Northrop Grumman team was expecting this to be a low-risk, low-cost strategy for the competition, augmented by the fact that Hawk-based McDonnell Douglas/Boeing T-45C Goshawk with glass cockpit is used to train Naval Aviators and Naval Flight Officers students slated for tactical jet aircraft for the U.S. Navy and U.S. Marine Corps. On 13 September 2013, Rolls-Royce announced it would join the team and provide integration support for its Adour Mk951 engine.

However, in 2015, Northrop Grumman was no longer submitting the Hawk for T-X consideration, primarily due to airframe performance shortcomings with maneuvers such as high angle-of-attack and sustained accelerations, as well as concerns regarding affordability. Instead, Northrop Grumman had begun a new clean-sheet design to closely match the evolving T-X requirements. Scaled Composites, a subsidiary of Northrop Grumman, was to construct the prototype, with a first flight expected in late 2015.

On 19 August 2016 in Mojave, Northrop Grumman publicly revealed a model of its T-X concept powered by a single GE F404-102D engine. The Scaled Composites Model 400 Swift made its first flight on 26 August, and six more thereafter; its maximum takeoff weight of 15,400 lb (7.0 t) was lighter than the Lockheed/KAI T-50A or the M-346-based Leonardo T-100, and 25% heavier than the winning Boeing/Saab design, it had a maximum speed of 500 kn (930 km/h) and a ceiling of 35,000 ft (11,000 m).

On 1 February 2017, the companies announced they would not submit a proposal for the T-X program.

=== Sierra Nevada–TAI Freedom ===
Sierra Nevada Corporation (SNC) and Turkish Aerospace Industries (TAI) considered offering a new aircraft for the T-X program based on the Freedom Trainer. The companies formed Freedom Aircraft Ventures LLC in Centennial, Colorado to develop a lightweight, all-composite trainer for the competition. A mockup of the aircraft was unveiled in September 2017.

=== Textron AirLand Scorpion ===
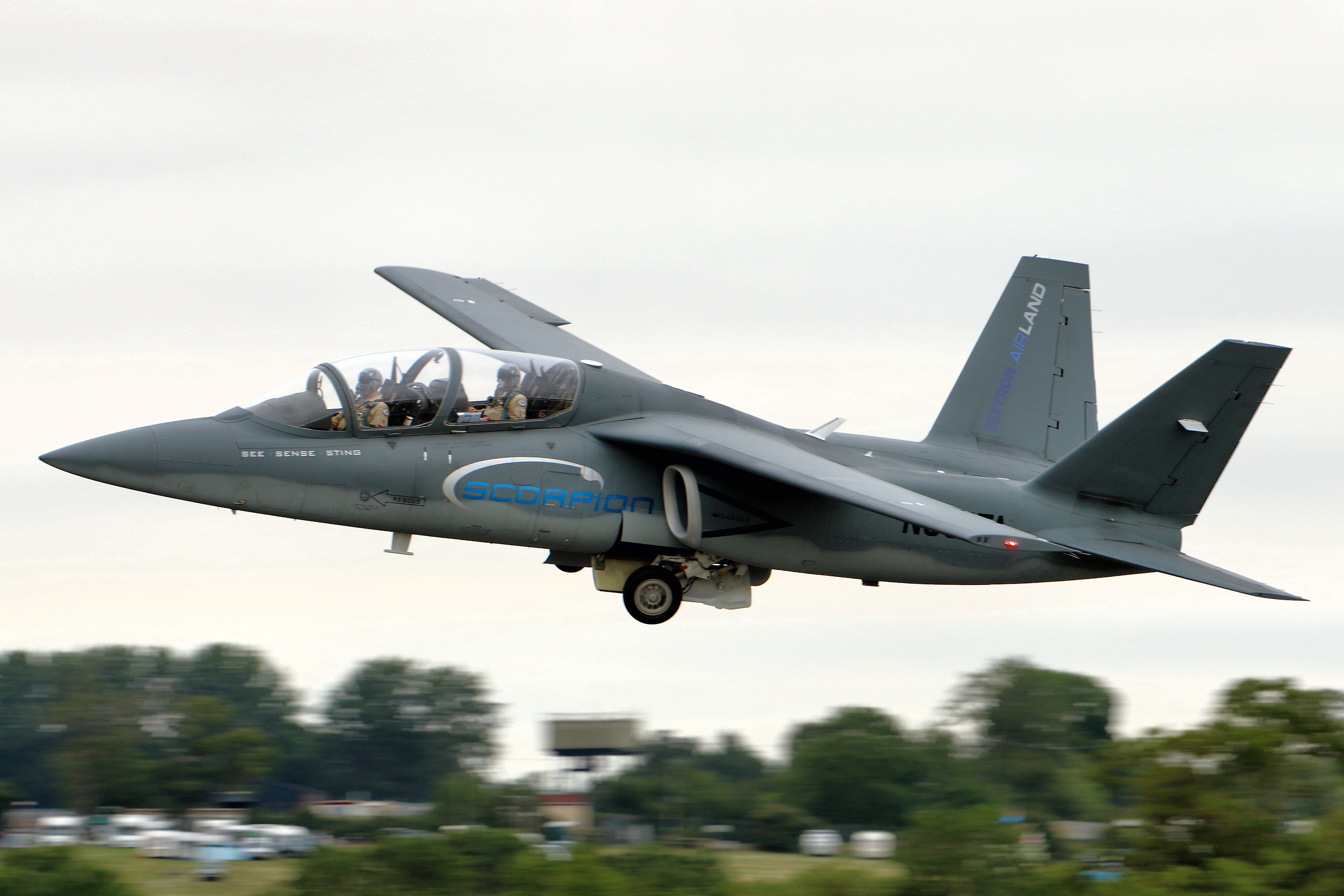
Textron AirLand Scorpion

Textron AirLand, a joint venture between Textron and AirLand Enterprises, developed the Textron AirLand Scorpion light attack jet which had potential as a candidate for the T-X program. Textron management stated that with some modifications, such as swapping the two engines with a single engine and changing the wings, the aircraft would be an ideal match for the T-X role. Additionally, during the Farnborough 2014 Airshow, Textron representatives expressed significant interest in the T-X program, and indicated they were closely following the progression of the draft requirements. On 23 August 2014, Textron AirLand formally confirmed they would compete for the T-X trainer and modify the Scorpion to better fit the training requirements. However, in September 2015 Textron AirLand revealed it would not offer a version of the Scorpion for the program due to changing Air Force requirements, moving from a low-cost advanced jet trainer requiring little development to a high-performance fly-by-wire trainer with top tier handling qualities. The company stated it was still interested in the T-X, but would have to offer a clean-sheet design like most of the other competitors.

== See also ==
- Joint Primary Aircraft Training System
