= Leonardo M-346 =

Military training aircraft

M-346 Master
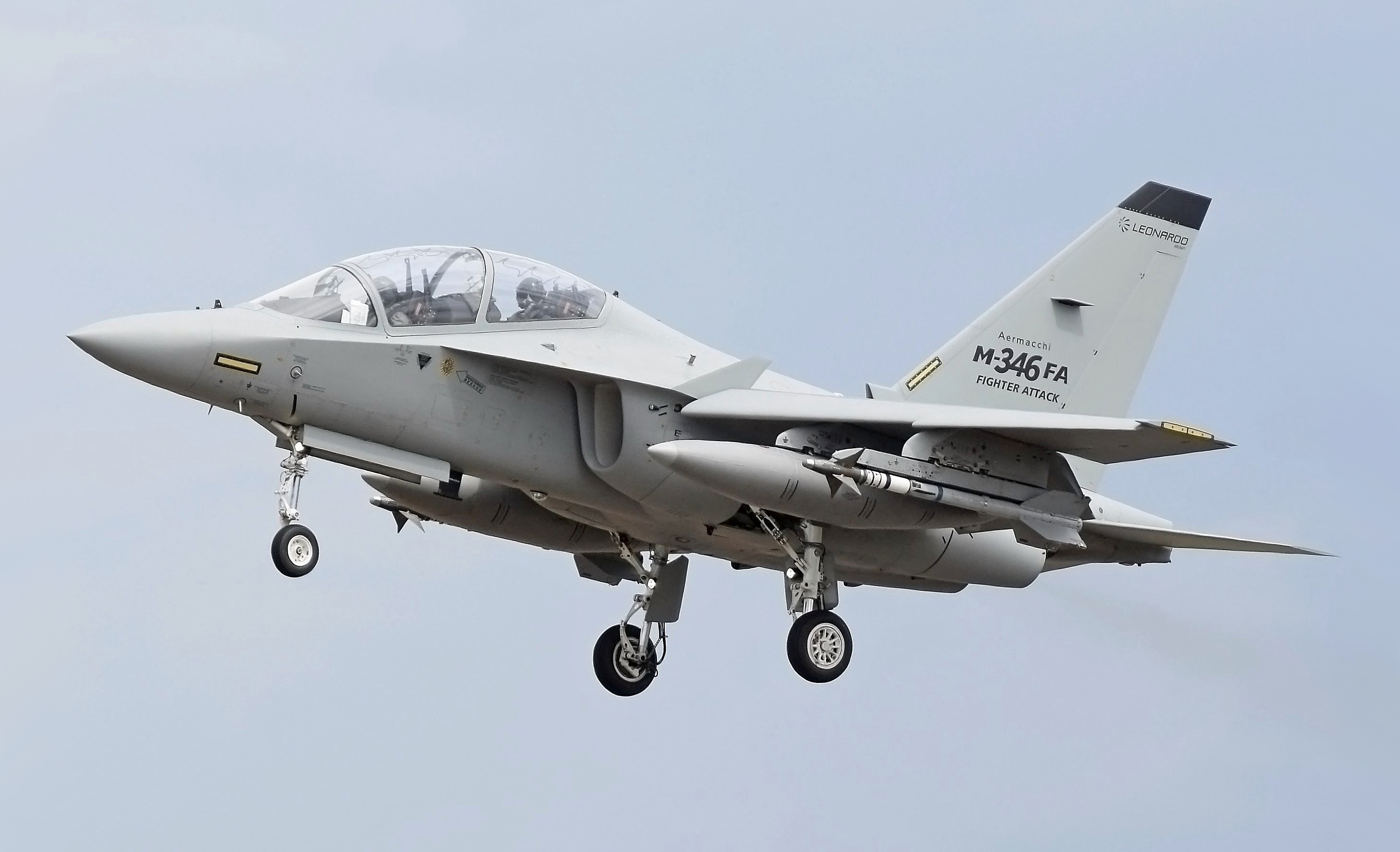
- An M-346FA carrying AIM-9 air-to-air missiles arrives at the 2017 Royal International Air Tattoo.

General information
- Type: Jet trainer and light combat aircraft
- National origin: Italy
- Manufacturer: Alenia Aermacchi; Leonardo S.p.A.
- Status: In service
- Primary users: Italian Air Force Israeli Air Force; Polish Air Force; Republic of Singapore Air Force; Hellenic Air Force
- Number built: 165 ordered 103 delivered (September 2025)

History
- Manufactured: 2004–present
- Introduction date: September 2015
- First flight: 15 July 2004
- Developed from: Yak/AEM-130

The Leonardo M-346 Master is an italian family of military twin-engined, transonic, advanced jet trainers and light combat aircraft. Originally co-developed with Yakovlev as the Yak/AEM-130, the partnership was dissolved in 2000 and then Alenia Aermacchi proceeded to separately develop the M-346 Master, while Yakovlev continued work on the Yakovlev Yak-130. The first flight of the M-346 was performed in 2004. The M-346 is currently in operation with the air forces of Italy, Israel, Singapore, Greece, Qatar, Turkmenistan, and Poland. In 2017, the manufacturer rebranded as Leonardo.

== Development ==
=== Background ===
In 1992, Aermacchi signed a cooperation agreement with Yakovlev to provide financial and technical support for the new trainer that the firm had been developing since 1991 for the Russian Air Force in competition with the Mikoyan MiG-AT. Aermacchi also gained the right to modify and market the aircraft for the Western market. The resulting aircraft first flew in 1996 and was brought to Italy the following year to replace the aging MB-339. By this point, the aircraft was being marketed as the Yak/AEM-130. In February 1996, Russia provided initial funding for the Yak/AEM-130 and pledged to purchase up to 200 aircraft for the Russian Air Force.

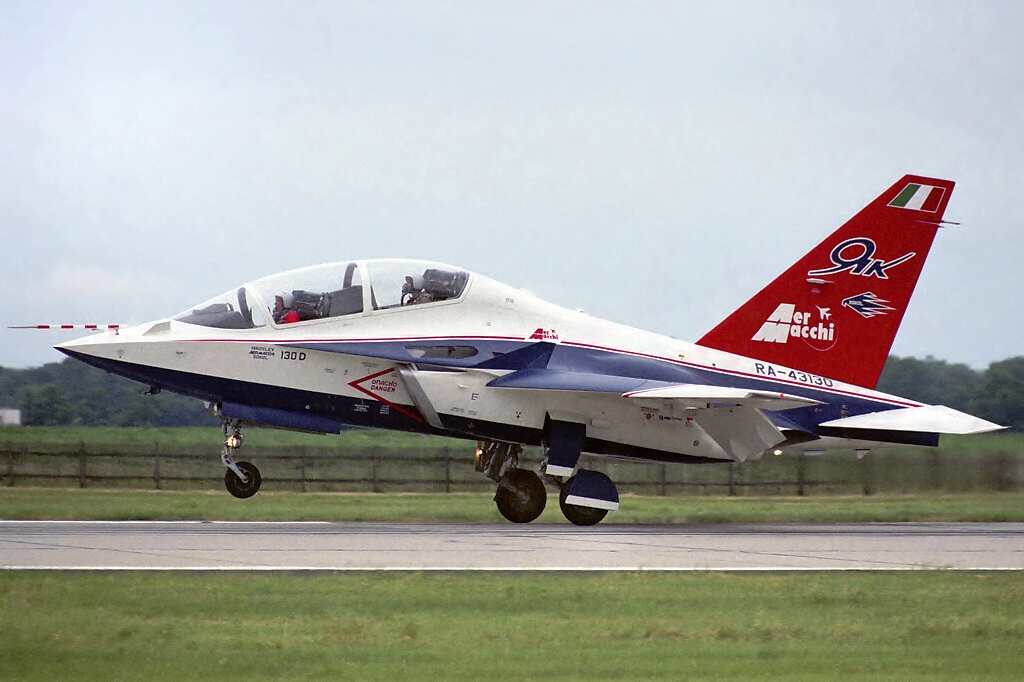
Yak/AEM-130 prototype landing at M. R. Štefánik Airport in 1999

In October 1998, the venture reportedly was increasingly becoming an Italian-led effort due to a lack of financial support on the part of Russia. By July 2000, Aermacchi held a 50% stake in the development programme, and Yakovlev and Sokol had a 25% share each. In mid-2000, it was announced that differences in priorities between the two firms and a lack of financial backing from the programme's Russian participants had brought about an end to the partnership, and each firm would pursue development of the aircraft independently; Yakovlev received US$77 million in the form of a partial write-off of the USSR/Russian debt towards Italy and for the legal right to use some of the technical documents of the aircraft. Yakovlev would be able to sell the Yak-130 to countries such as those in the Commonwealth of Independent States, India, Slovakia, and Algeria, while Aermacchi would be able to sell the M-346 to NATO countries, among others.

The M-346 is a highly modified version of the aircraft that was being developed under the joint venture. It uses equipment exclusively from Western manufacturers, such as the digital flight-control system being developed by a collaboration between Teleavio, Marconi Italiana, and BAE Systems. In July 2000, Aermacchi selected the Honeywell F124 turbofan engine to power the type in place of the originally intended Lotarev DV-2S powerplant. In 2004, a contract for the development of a full-mission simulator for the M-346 was awarded to CAE. Further production contracts for CAE's full-mission simulator have since been issued.

=== Into flight ===
On 7 June 2003, the first M-346 prototype rolled out; ground testing commenced shortly thereafter. On 15 July 2004, the first prototype conducted its maiden flight.

In January 2005, the Greek Ministry of Defence signed a memorandum of understanding (MOU) to become a partner in the programme, followed by an industrial cooperation agreement between Aermacchi and Hellenic Aerospace Industry in 2006. In March 2008, the Chilean ENAER signed an MOU with Alenia Aermacchi at the FIDAE air show.

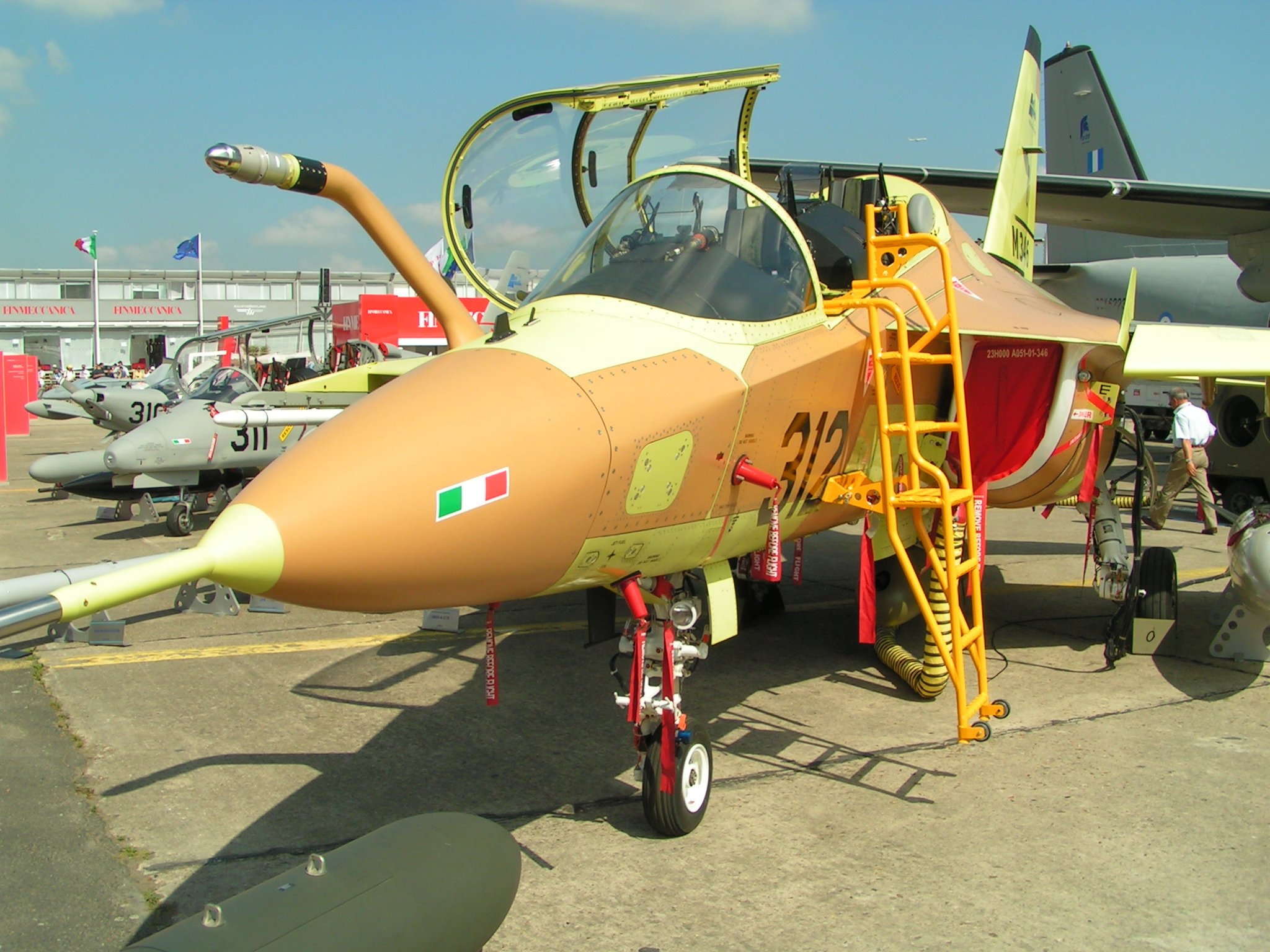
M-346 prototype 002 at Le Bourget airshow, 2005

On 10 April 2008, the first low rate initial production (LRIP-00) aircraft, produced in the final configuration (new landing gear and air brake and more composite parts), was rolled out. On 18 December 2008, Aermacchi announced that the M-346 had attained a maximum speed of Mach 1.15 (1,255 km/h, 678 knots, 780 mph), claiming the occasion to be the first in which an all-Italian built aircraft had broken the sound barrier in 50 years.

In May 2008, Boeing signed an MOU to cooperate on the marketing, sales, training, and support of two Aermacchi trainer aircraft, the M-346 and the M-311.

On 20 June 2011, a military type certificate was granted to Alenia Aermacchi for the M-346 Master by the General Directorate for Aeronautical Armaments of the Italian Ministry of Defence in Rome. Throughout the certification process, the M-346 development aircraft made 180 test flights, totalling 200 flights across the course of the previous five months, during which over 3,300 test points were completed.

=== Further development ===
In the advanced jet-trainer role, the original M-346 model is unarmed; however, in November 2015, Alenia Aermacchi reported it was close to finalising a combat-capable, dual-role variant of the aircraft. During late 2017, a series of armed tests involving the AIM-9L missiles took place. In 2015, an armed variant, designated as the M-346 Light Combat Aircraft, was offered to Poland; this reportedly included a capability of operating the Brimstone air-to-ground missile.

The armed variant is under development, designated M-346FA. The first preseries aircraft has flown from Venegono Airfield in July 2020.

In February 2016, the newly created, consolidated Leonardo-Finmeccanica company promoted the Aermacchi M346 in two new roles - companion training and dissimilar air combat training. To better replicate the flight performance and behavior of various enemy aircraft, both the g-force and angle of attack can be independently selected in the flight-control system; reportedly, existing customers have stated the type to be well suited to the aggressor role. Leonardo has offered the M-346 for companion training and adversary/Red Air roles.

In January 2021, Israeli and Greece ministers of defence announced plans to establish a wide-ranging $1.68 billion security agreement that include the procurement of 10 M-346 aircraft and the establishment and operation of a flight school for the Hellenic Air Force by Elbit Systems, including provisions for simulators, training, and logistical support.

In 2025, Leonardo outlined its ambition for the M-346 to evolve into a common training platform for Global Combat Air Programme (GCAP) partners Italy, Japan, and the UK. “We should not develop GCAP without thinking about the training platform, and why not start with the M-346,” said Tommaso Pani, according to aviation industry research group FlightGlobal.

In June 2026, Leonardo and Turkish UAV manufacturer Baykar unveiled their K-SWARM programme, aimed at enhancing coordination between crewed and uncrewed aircraft. The testing featured a Leonardo-owned M-346 Fighter Attack aircraft, accompanied by an Italian Air Force T-346A acting as a chase aircraft, and Baykar’s Bayraktar Kızılelma uncrewed fighter.

== Design ==
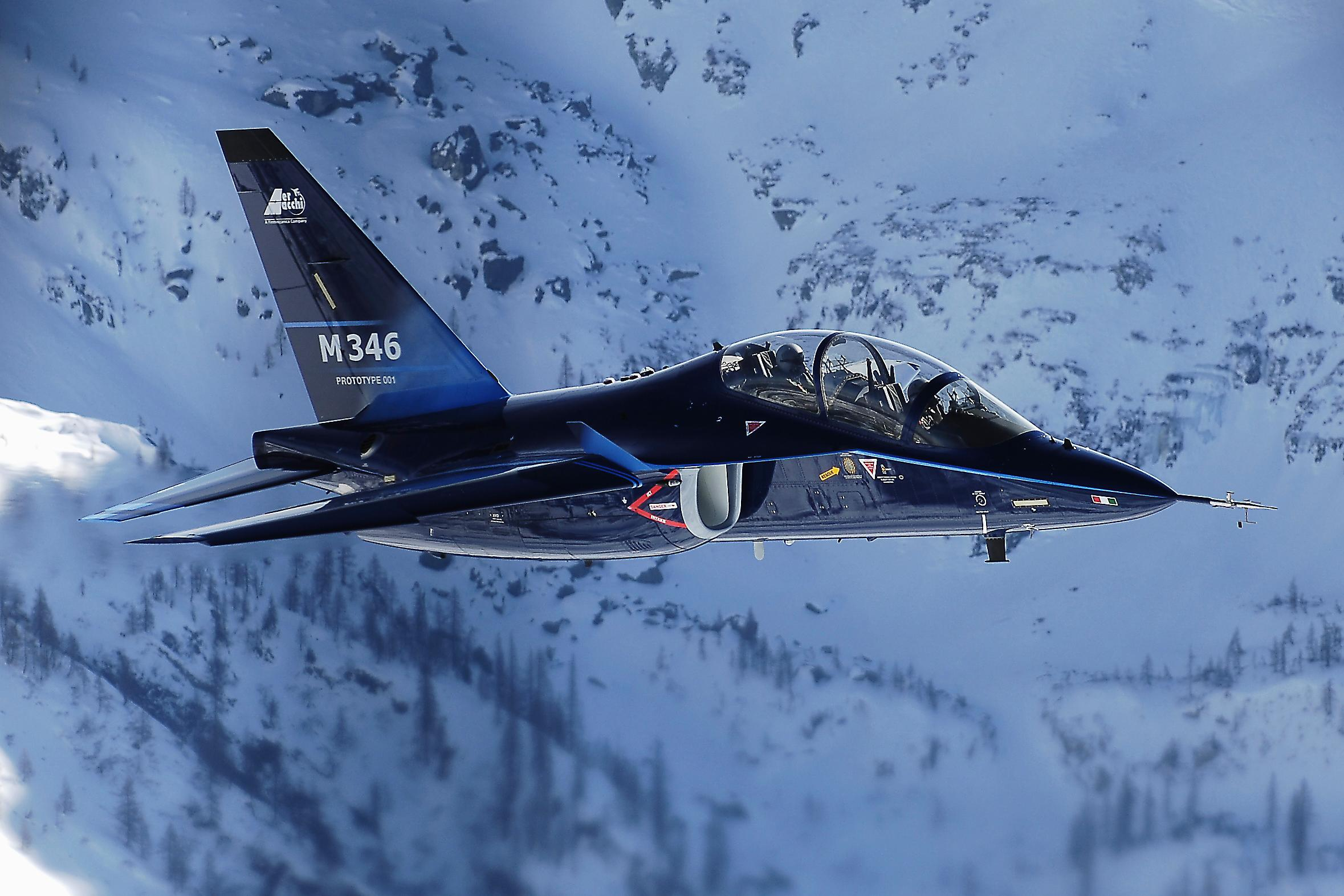
An M-346 prototype in flight

The M-346 is designed for the main role of lead-in fighter trainer, in which aircraft's performance and capabilities are used to deliver pilot training for the latest generation of combat fighter aircraft. Powered by a pair of Honeywell F124 turbofan dry engines, designed to reduce acquisition and operating costs, it is capable of transonic flight without using an afterburner; Alenia Aermacchi has claimed that the M-346's flight performance to be "second only to afterburner-equipped aircraft". During the design process, the twin concepts of "design-to-cost" and "design-to-maintain" were followed, reducing acquisition and operational costs; the per-flying-hour costs of the M346 are reportedly one-tenth of those of the Eurofighter Typhoon. Outside of the training role, the M-346 was designed from the onset to accommodate additional operational capabilities, including combat missions such as close air support and air policing duties.

The M-346 incorporates a full-authority, quadruplex digital, fly-by-wire flight-control system, which in combination with the optimized aerodynamic configuration of the aircraft, provides for full manoeuvrability and controllability at very high angle of attack (in excess of 30°). The flight-control system, incorporating a HOTAS design philosophy, is equipped with adjustable angle of attack and g-force limitations; when combined with its wide performance envelope, this allows the M-346 to effectively mimic the flight performance of various fighter aircraft operated by trainee pilots or to progressively increase difficulty levels, thus raising the training's effectiveness. A pilot-activated recovery system is present, which when pressed, conducts an automatic recovery by returning the aircraft to a steady and level flight path.

A digital avionics system, modelled on its counterparts on board the latest generation of military aircraft such as the Saab JAS-39 Gripen, the Lockheed Martin F-22 Raptor, and the Eurofighter Typhoon, is incorporated, making it suitable for all stages of advanced flight training, thus reducing the use of combat aircraft for training purposes,”downloading” flight hours from Operational Conversion Unit (OCU) to Pilot Training Unit. A modular avionics architecture is employed, allowing for new equipment and systems to be incorporated and increasing the type's growth potential. The M-346's glass cockpit is representative of the latest-generation cockpit and is compatible with night vision goggles; it has three-color, liquid-crystal multifunctional displays, a head-up display (also in the rear cockpit), and an optional helmet-mounted display (HMD). A voice-command system is also present, which is integrated with functions such as the navigation system. The communication systems include VHF/UHF transceivers, identification friend or foe transponder, and midair collision avoidance system, and ground-proximity warning system.

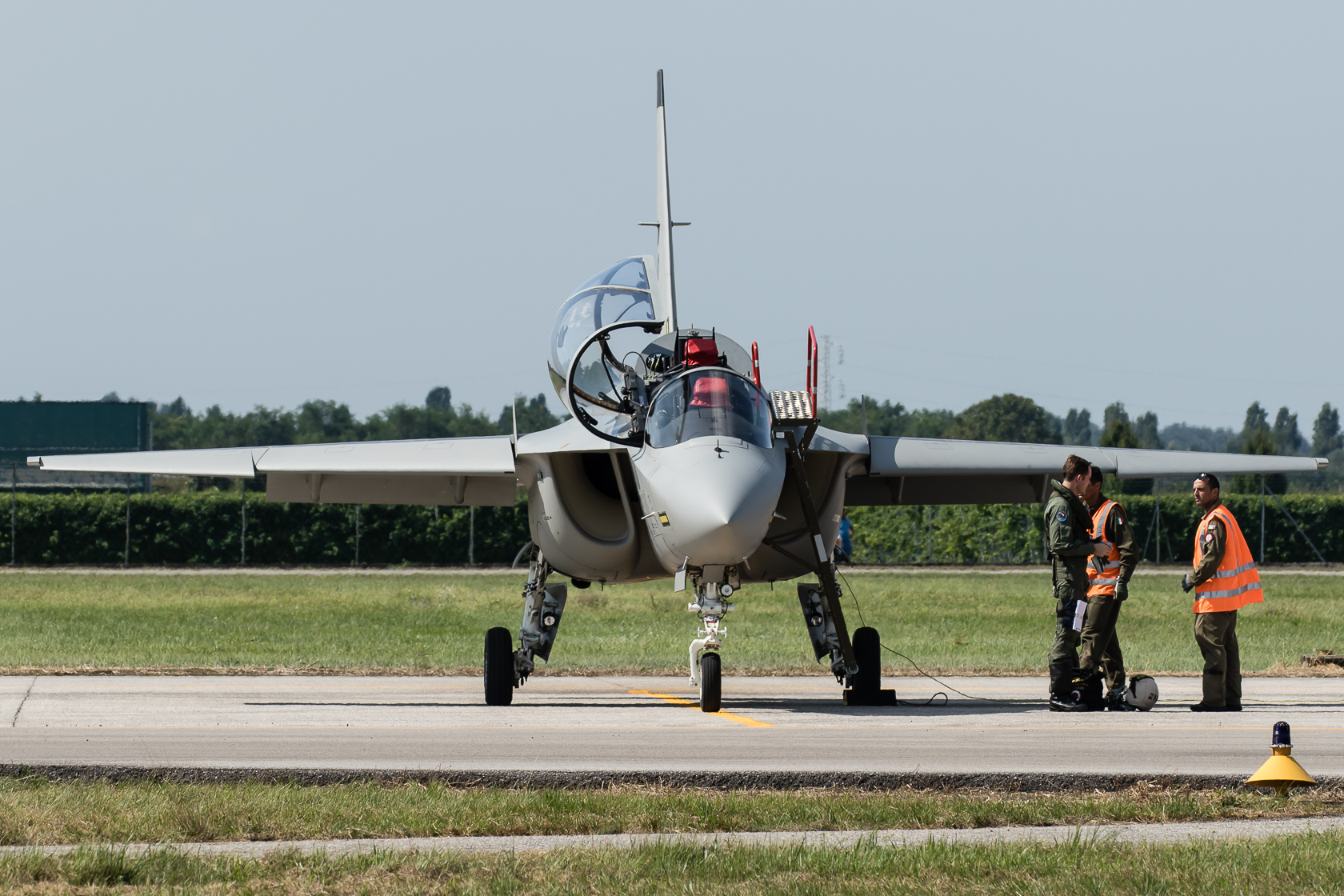
Head-on view of a M-346 on the ground, 2015

A key feature of the M-346 is the embedded tactical training system (ETTS), which is capable of emulating various equipment, such as radar, targeting pods, weapons, and electronic warfare systems; additionally, the it can interface with various munitions and other equipment actually being carried on board. The system can act in a standalone mode, in which simulated data and scenario information, with threats and targets, is loaded prior to takeoff, or in a network, during which data are received and acted upon in real time from ground-monitoring stations via the aircraft's datalink. The ETTS can generate realistic computer-generated forces (both friend and foe). For postmission evaluation and analysis purposes, accumulated data, such as video from the optional HMD, can be extracted and reviewed. Leonardo also offer an integrated training system (ITS), combining the M-346 with a ground-based training system composed of academic training devices, simulators, mission-planning and training-management systems, and full logistic service as part of a wider syllabus towards qualifying pilots.

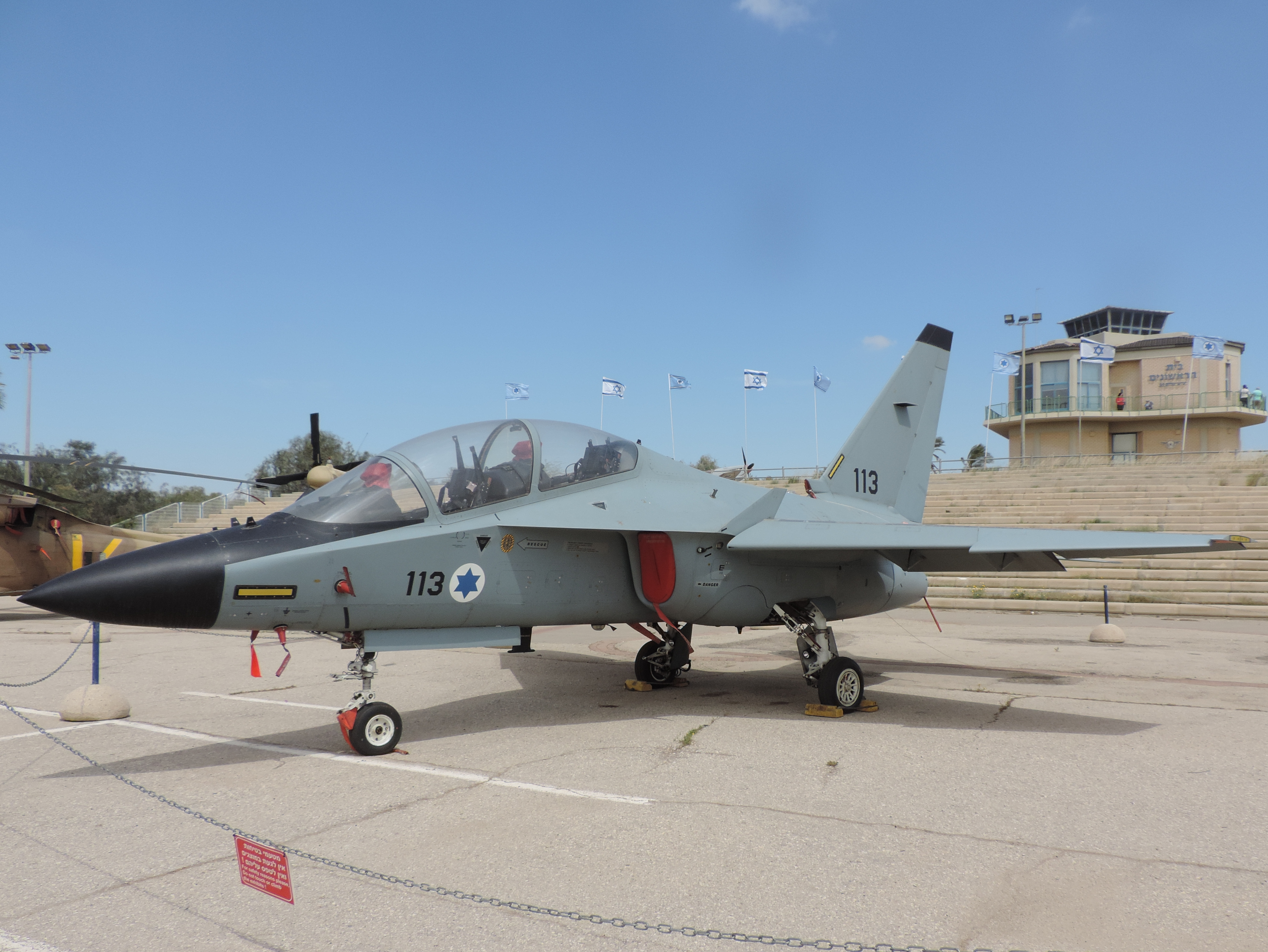
A M-346 of Israeli Air Force on display

The M-346, in the multirole fighter attack variant (M-346FA), is equipped with a multimode fire-control radar (Grifo M-346 by Leonardo Electronics) and a total of seven hardpoints; it is capable of carrying external loads up to 3,000 kg while maintaining a high thrust-to-weight ratio; stores management data can be presented upon any of the multifunction displays in the cockpit. The radar cross-section of the M346 in a standard configuration is reportedly 20 m^{2}; this can be reduced to 1 m^{2} by installing a low-observability kit that has been developed for the type. Other self-protection systems that can be fitted include a defensive-aids support system, which includes a radar warning receiver, missile-approach warning system, and chaff and flare dispensers. The high-end, net-centric communication suite of the M-346FA includes secure communicatioss and a tactical tatalink, both NATO and non-NATO.

The combat-capable M-346FA can perform ground-attack, homeland-defence, and air-policing missions and reconnaissance. Various munitions and stores can be carried, including IRIS-T or AIM-9 Sidewinder air-to-air missiles, various air-to-surface missiles, antiship missiles, free-fall and laser-guided bombs and rockets, a 12.7 mm gun pod, reconnaissance and targeting pods, and electronicwarfare pods; weapon aiming is performed using the HMD and the multifunction displays. All main systems are duplicated, and the flight system is reconfigurable to increase survivability and functionality in the event of battle damage being sustained. The aircraft has a maximum range of 1,375 nautical miles when outfitted with a maximum of three external fuel tanks; this can be extended by in-flight refueling using a removable refueling probe.

== Operational history ==
=== Italian Air Force ===
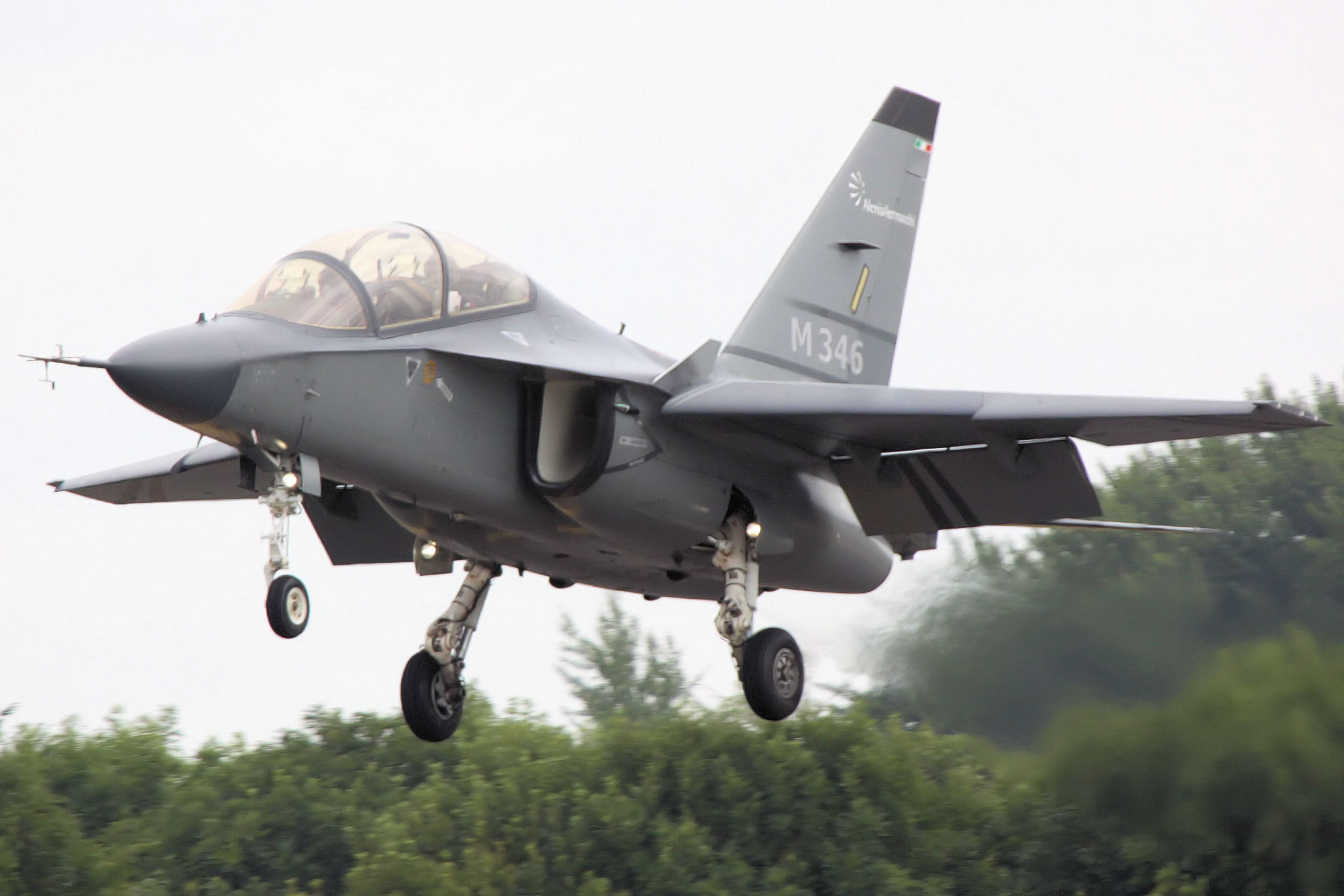
M-346 at RIAT 2009

In 2007, the Italian Air Force reportedly intended initially to acquire a batch of 15 low-rate-production M-346s. On 18 June 2009, Alenia Aermacchi announced it had received an order for the first six with an option for nine more. In September 2015, the Italian Air Force started their first training course using the M-346 trainer. In March 2016, Finmeccanica signed a contract worth over 300 million euros with the Italian Ministry of Defence for nine M-346s, bringing the number of aircraft ordered by Italy to 18.

In February 2018, the Italian Air Force received its 18th M-346, concluding its acquisition program. In 2019, four more M-346 were delivered to the newly formed Italian Air Force/Leonardo International Flight Training School at Galatina Air Base.

On 12 September 2024, the Italian Air Force's aerobatic team Frecce Tricolori unveiled the M-346 as its new aircraft to replace the Aermacchi MB-339-A/PAN, alongside a new livery designed by Pininfarina.

=== Singapore Air Force ===
In July 2010, the M-346 was selected by the Republic of Singapore Air Force (RSAF) to replace the ST Aerospace A-4SU Super Skyhawks in the advanced jet training role, based at BA 120 Cazaux Air Base in France. In a press release by the Singaporean Ministry of Defence on 28 September 2010, ST Aerospace was awarded the contract to acquire 12 M-346s and a ground-based training system on behalf of RSAF. As stipulated in the contract, ST Aerospace acts as the main contractor in the maintenance of the aircraft after delivery by Alenia Aermacchi, while Boeing supplies the training system. The RSAF holds the distinction of being the first export customer for the type.

=== Israeli Air Force ===
On 16 February 2012, the M-346 was selected by the Israeli Air Force (IAF) in an exchange deal, in which Israel was to build a reconnaissance satellite and AWACs systems for Italy in return for the planes. It will operate as the IAF's main training jet to replace the McDonnell Douglas A-4H/N Skyhawk, which has served the IAF for over 40 years. On 19 July 2012, a contract was signed between Alenia Aermacchi and the Israeli Ministry of Defence to supply 30 M-346s, with the first delivery expected in the middle of 2014. The IAF announced on 2 July 2013 that in Israeli service, the M-346 would be named the Lavi, reusing the name given to the cancelled IAI Lavi. The IAF's first M-346 was rolled out in a ceremony at Alenia Aermacchi's factory in Venegono Superiore on March 20, 2014.

=== Polish Air Force ===
On 23 December 2013, it was announced that Poland had selected the M-346 to meet a requirement for an advanced jet trainer. A contract for eight aircraft was signed on 27 February 2014. The first two M-346s arrived at Dęblin in November 2016. The aircraft were initially not officially accepted due to non-compliance with contract specifications. The delivery deadline was originally November 2016, but delays meant delivery and acceptance was not complete until 22 December 2017.

In December 2017, Poland's Ministry of National Defence announced it was seeking financial penalties from Leonardo of up to 100 million zlotys (US$28 million) over the delays. Additionally, the ministry had complained that the M-346 was not fully capable of simulating certain weapon systems for training purposes. On 19 November 2018, Leonardo's Aircraft Division together with Elbit Systems completed delivery of M-346 full-mission simulators and flight-training devices to the Polish Air Force. This was initially scheduled to be completed by November 2016.

In March 2018, Poland signed for an additional four M-346s and a support package, plus options for a further four aircraft with a support package. In December 2018, Poland signed for the additional four aircraft, as well as upgrades to the existing fleet of eight. Deliveries and upgrade work for the total of 16 M-346s was expected to run into 2022.

On 12 July 2024, a Polish Air Force M-346 Demo Team jet crashed during its flying display near Gdynia. Pilot Maj. Robert “Killer” Jeł lost his life in the crash.

=== Potential operators ===
==== Argentina ====
In October 2016, the Argentine Air Force also evaluated the M-346 as a potential combat fighter to replace the Dassault Mirage III and Mirage 5 aircraft it had retired in 2015, as well as the Douglas A-4AR aircraft that remain in service with only limited capability. Argentina was speculated to be interested in 10 to 12 aircraft.

==== Austria ====
By November 2025, Austria finalized the purchase of 12 Leonardo M-346-FA jets, to replace the retired Saab 105 and close a long-standing gap in its air-defense and pilot-training capabilities, with deployment planned in Linz-Hörsching from 2028. The package spans about €1.5 billion, including aircraft, weapons, simulators, training, and maintenance. It enables the full implementation of the Bundesheer’s two-fleet strategy alongside the Eurofighter, and aims to restore domestic pilot training, which was previously outsourced abroad.

==== Azerbaijan ====
On 20 February 2020, the president of Azerbaijan announced that the country would buy an undisclosed number of M-346s. The Azerbaijani Air and Air Defence Force has a requirement to augment and replace its Soviet-era Mikoyan MiG-29, Sukhoi Su-25, and Aero L-39 Albatros jets. The number of aircraft to be purchased is 10 plus an option for 15. Azerbaijani military leaders also considered the Yak-130 for the trainer requirement, but selected the M-346 despite its higher price because of its lighter weight and higher maneuverability and problems with manufacturing of the engines for Yak-130.

==== Brazil ====
In July 2024, during the 2024 edition of the Farnborough International Airshow, Leonardo presented and offered to Brazil the new-variant Block 20 as a candidate for the Brazilian Air Force's process of selection for a light attack jet to replace the older AMX attack jet. The aircraft was evaluated by the MoD minister José Múcio and the air force commander Marcelo Kanitz Damasceno. In November 2024, during the visit to Brazil by the Italian Prime Minister Giorgia Meloni, she was to meet Brazilian President Luiz Inácio Lula da Silva to discuss the sale of 24 M-346s to the Brazilian Air Force, another six aircraft to the Brazilian Navy, and other related accords.

==== Canada ====
International Test Pilots School of Canada, which provides training capacity to NATO forces, ordered six M-346T Block 20 jet trainers with option for additional six aircraft in May 2026. The first aircraft is expected to enter service in 2029.

On 16 June 2026, in the margins of the 52nd G7 Summit, Canada officially entered negotiations with Italy to procure the M-346 trainer for the Royal Canadian Air Force (RCAF). The platform aims to replace aging aircraft under the Future Fighter Lead-in Training (FFLIT) program. The M-346 has been used to train pilots on both the Lockheed Martin F-35 Lightning II and the Saab JAS 39 Gripen, both of which are looking to enter service with the RCAF. No definitive numbers, costs, or timelines were given.

==== Colombia ====
The M-346 FA has been selected over the KAI FA-50 Golden Eagle, but whether the purchase will be made was uncertain, as the Colombian Air Force is also looking to purchase an air superiority-capable fighter.

==== Eurotraining ====
The Advance European Pilot Training (AEPTJ) programme – unofficially called Eurotraining – a consortium of 12 European nations to give advance and lead-in fighter training with a common-core course and training provided by a common aircraft – has contacted Alenia Aermacchi through the European Defence agency in 2010, for further information on the M-346. In May 2013, Alenia Aermacchi announced that the AEPTJ held a low priority for the firm and that "...progress has been slow."

==== Indonesia ====
In 2010, Indonesia was considering to replace its BAE Hawk Mk 53 trainer and OV-10 Bronco attack aircraft with a new type, and the M-346 was among the potential candidates. Indonesian Air Force chose the T-50 Golden Eagle for its trainer and light-attack program in May 2011.

In July 2025, Indonesian Air Force delegation visited the Leonardo facility in Milan, and among other agenda items, inspected the M-346FA production line. The Ministry of Defense of Indonesia stated in December 2025 that discussion regarding the M-346FA is in its early stages. The Ministry of Defense signed a letter of intent for M-346F Block 20 in February 2026. One report said the deal involves the sale of 24 M-346FIs, with an option for another 12. The aircraft are to be supplied by the defense company E-Systems Solutions. In addition, to support the aircraft maintenance, the company also plans to integrate eaach Indonesian M-346F with IRIS-T air-to-air missile, indigenous MK-V Delta light cruise missile, self-protection jammer, and datalink.

Leonardo and PT E-Systems Solutions Indonesia announced the contract signing of 12 M-346F Block 20 planes for the Indonesian Air Force on 21 July 2026, during the Farnborough International Airshow. The contract is valued at around €1 billion or US$1.14 billion. Deliveries are expected to start in 2030.

==== Ireland ====
In July 2021, Leonardo made a submission to the Irish Commission on the Defence Forces presenting the M-346FA as a light multirole fighter and advanced trainer for the Irish Air Corps. The commission has multiple tasks, including determining the future capability requirements for the Irish Defence Forces. Currently, the Irish Air Corps has a very limited air-combat capability with eight Pilatus PC-9M training/light-attack aircraft. The M-346FA could be a cheaper alternative to more expensive fighters and would be Ireland's first combat jet aircraft since the retirement of the six Fouga CM.170 Magister aircraft in 1999. In comparison to Ireland's current air-combat capability, the M-346FA would be considered by many to be a step up, introducing features such as air-to-air missiles and onboard radar.

==== Japan ====
The M-346 Block 20 is speculated to be a contender to replace the aging Kawasaki T-4. Some Japanese fighter pilots began flying the M-346 with the International Flight Training School.

==== Spain ====
Possible replacement of Spanish Northrop F-5BMs. Although Spain signed a memorandum for cooperation in December 2024 for the TAI Hürjet, Leonardo continues to support the sale of the M-346 to the Spanish Air Force. In fact, a study by the University Center for Defense (CUD) in San Javier, Murcia, concluded in 2020 that this aircraft is the best option, after comparing it against other market options such as the KAI T-50 and the Yak-130. The authors applied the fuzzy-reference ideal method to rank advanced military trainer aircraft. However in 2025, it was announced that Spain had chosen to acquire the TAI Hürjet.

==== Tunisia ====
On 31 July 2025, a delegation from Leonardo offered the M-346 as a replacement for the Aero L-59 Super Albatros.

==== United Arab Emirates ====
The M-346 was named the winner of a competition by the United Arab Emirates at the IDEX 2009 defense show in Abu Dhabi on 25 February 2009. The official said the order involved delivery of 48 aircraft to be used for pilot-training and light-attack duties. A final request for proposals in 2010 had set the requirement at 20 trainers, 20 aircraft for combat duties, and the remainder would go toward the creation of an aerobatic team. However, by January 2010, negotiations to sign a contract had reportedly stalled over specifications. On 18 November 2011, the prototype, which had been on display at the Dubai Airshow, crashed after departing Dubai on return to Italy.

==== United Kingdom ====
In 2025, the report that RAF pilots were training with the M-346 at the International Flight Training School in Sardinia, Italy. According to the Ministry of Defence, six RAF pilots completed their training at the Sardinian base during the 2024–25 training year, with a further two RAF pilots forecast to complete their training during 2025–26 and three in 2026–27.

At the Farnborough International Airshow in July 2026, newly-appointed Leonardo CEO Lorenzo Mariani said that Leonardo's M-346 would be bidding in the competition to select the replacement for the BAE Systems Hawk as the RAF's fast jet trainer aircraft. In comments, Mariani said that Leonardo would be seeking additional UK industrial partners to support the bid.

==== United States Air Force ====
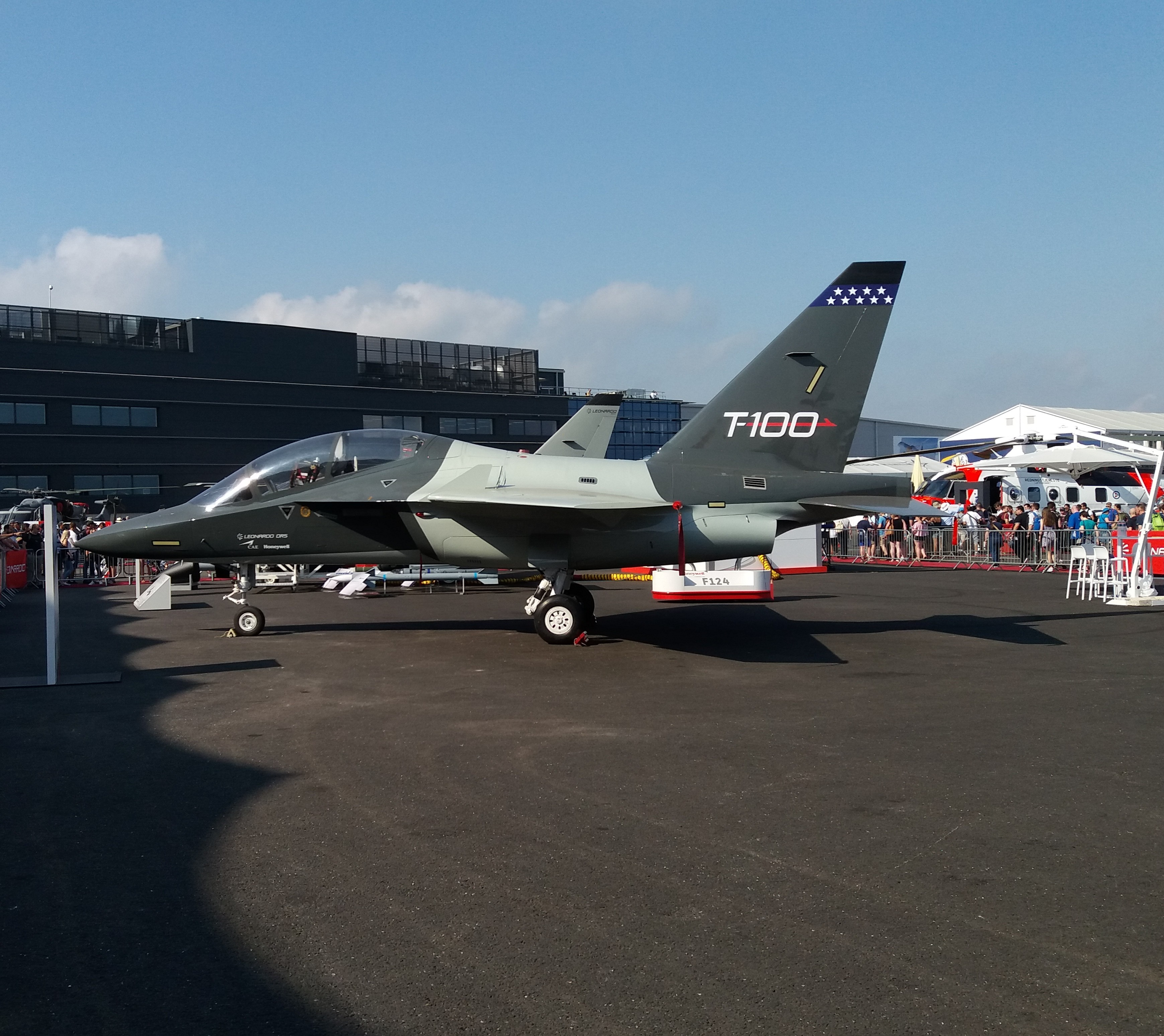
T-100 at Farnborough Airshow 2018

Alenia Aermacchi submitted the M-346 for the United States Air Force's T-X program to replace the aging Northrop T-38 Talon, rebranding it as the Leonardo DRS T-100 Integrated Training System. Alenia originally intended to be the prime contractor, anticipating moving the final assembly location from Italy to the United States if the bid succeeded. About 350 aircraft were expected to be ordered, with further purchases leading to over 1,000 aircraft being purchased overall. In January 2013, Alenia Aermacchi signed a letter of intent with General Dynamics C4 Systems, which intended to serve as the prime contractor for the T-X bid; however, General Dynamics announced its withdrawal in March 2015. On 1 January 2016, Alenia Aermacchi was absorbed into Leonardo S.p.A. In February 2016, it was announced that Raytheon, which would serve as the prime contractor, had teamed up with Leonardo to offer an advanced variant of the M-346 for the T-X program called the T-100.

On 25 January 2017, Raytheon announced that it had withdrawn as prime contractor and American partner in the T-X competition. One of the sticking points had been price per unit; at the time, the M-346 had a flyaway cost of $25 million, but Raytheon wanted Leonardo to reduce that by 30%. On 8 February 2017, Leonardo confirmed that it would remain in the T-X competition alone, with Leonardo DRS, its American subsidiary, serving as prime contractor. In September 2017, the T-X program announced it had selected the rival Boeing T-7 Red Hawk submission, instead.

On 22 August 2025, the Italian Air Force and the U.S. Air Force (USAF) signed the "Concept of Operations (CONOPS) for Flight Training of the USAF Military Personnel in Italy", which would see U.S. student pilots, for the first time in history, be trained in a foreign NATO pilot school, the International Flight Training School, on the M-346. The first course with 10 USAF pilots was scheduled to start on 8 September 2025, and was to be completed by June 2026, leading the students to the USAF military wings.

==== United States Navy ====
The M-346 is being offered to the United States Navy Undergraduate Jet Training System competition to replace the aging McDonnell Douglas T-45 Goshawk by Leonardo (company) with Textron Aviation Defense being the prime contractor for the bid. On 28 July 2025, Textron announced it will offer a US-made version of the Italian light jet under the designation Beechcraft M-346N. The offer has been described to have been adapted to the Navy's revised requirements, conducting only field carrier landing practice (FCLP) approaches to wave off, thereby obviating the need for a tailhook, catapult launch bar, or extensive structural modifications for arrested carrier operations. This focus on FCLP-only training aligns with the fifth USN request for information released on 31 March 2025.

==== Uruguay ====
As part of the Fuerza Aérea Uruguaya modernization efforts, Uruguay has shown interest in purchasing at least six new radar-equipped aircraft to replace its Cessna A-37; according to sources within the force, the M-346 is favored over the Hongdu L-15.

== Variants ==
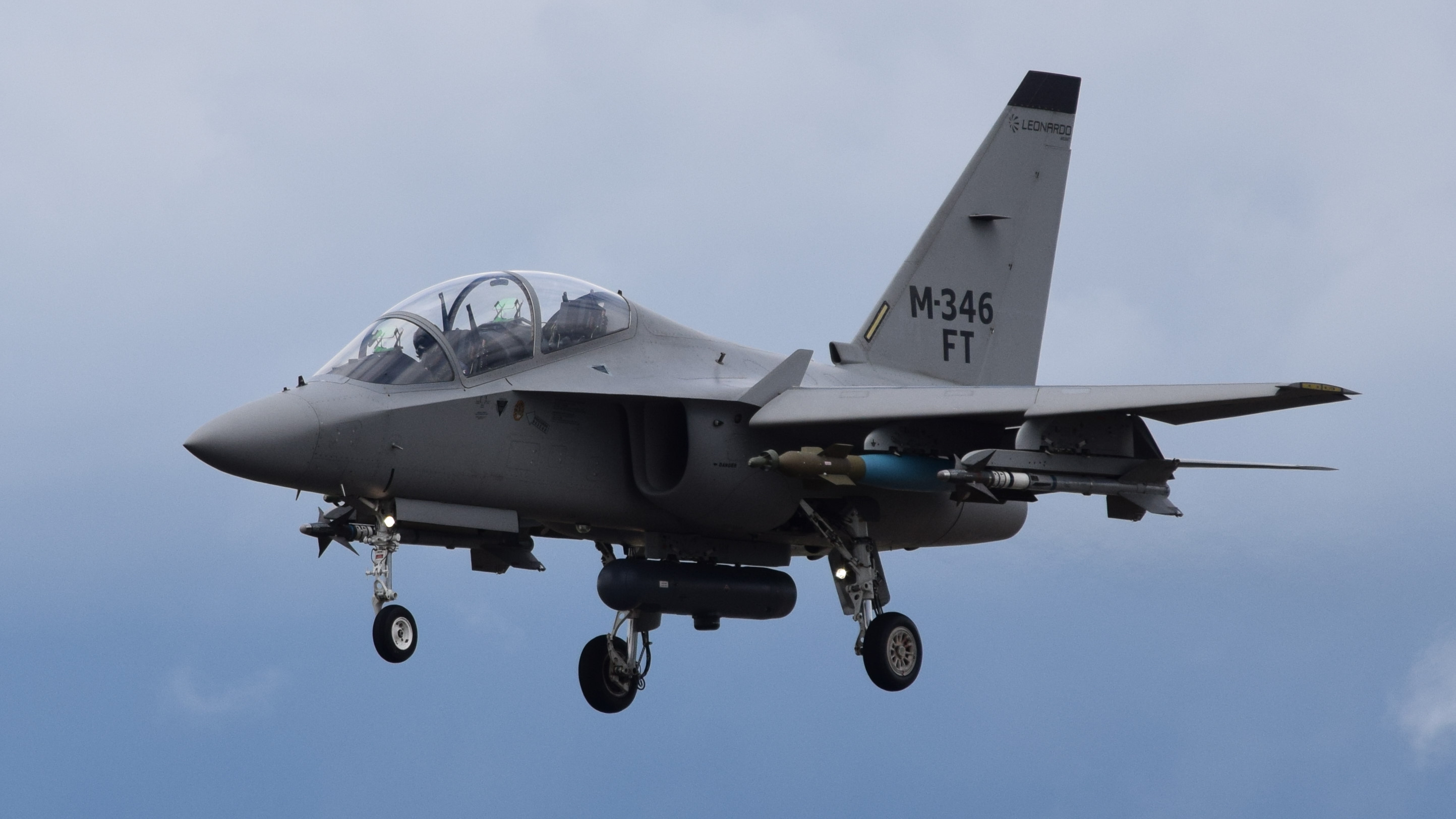
M-346FT multirole variant in 2016

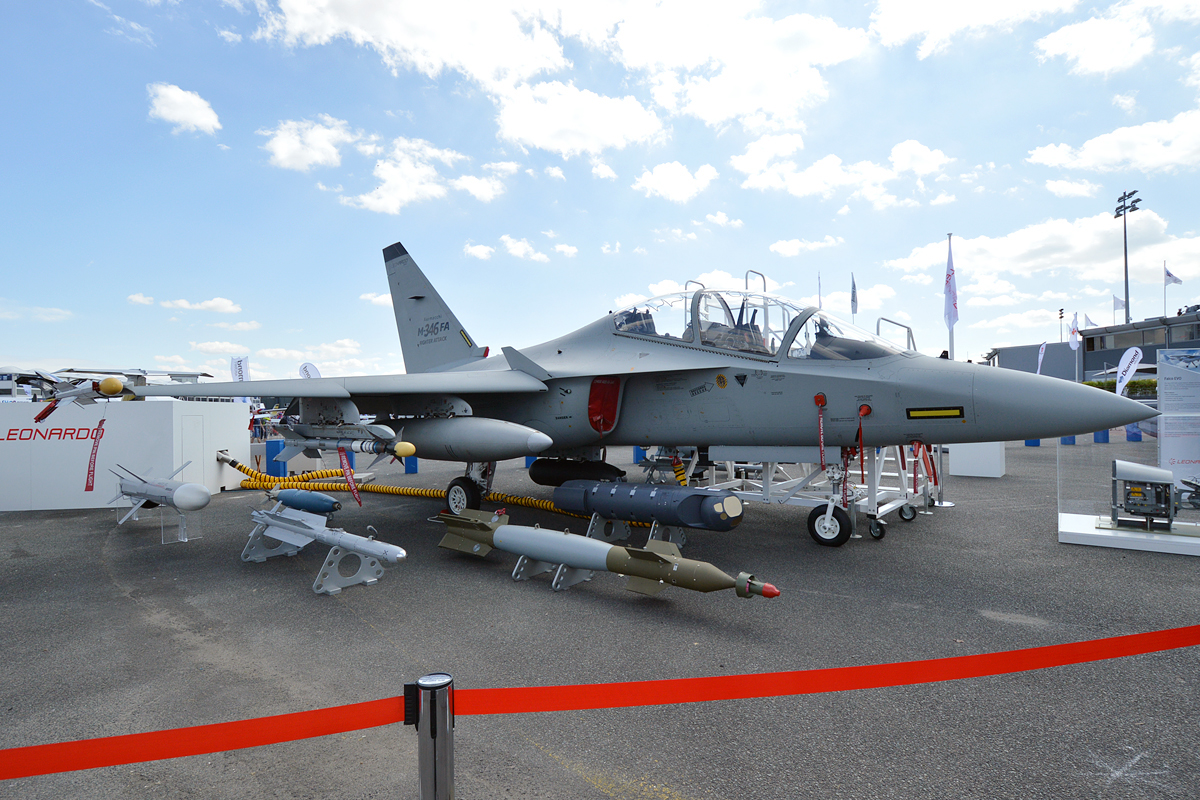
M-346FA multirole variant in 2017

M-346
Designation for the basic type.
T-346A
Italian military designation from 2012 for the M-346.
M-346LCA (Light Combat Aircraft)
Armed variant offered to Poland as a replacement for aging Su-22. Designation no longer in use.
M-346FT (Fighter Trainer)
Multirole variant capable of switching between training and combat operations. New features include a new tactical datalink system and different armament capability, but do not include physical changes to the hardware.
M-346FA (Fighter Attack)
Multirole variant capable of air-to-air and air-to-surface combat with a 3 tonne payload spread over seven hardpoints, advanced Grifo-M346 radar radar, countermeasures and stealth features including engine intake grids and radar-absorbing coatings on the canopy and wing leading edge. It is being marketed as a light attack aircraft also suitable for aggressor and companion training purposes. The aircraft was revealed on 18 June 2017, in a static display at that year's Paris Air Show. The aircraft is being marketed for export to South American and East Asian countries, and is claimed to be able to carry out operational missions at far lower costs than those of front-line fighters.
T-100
Designation used for the United States Air Force's T-X program.
M-346N ITS
Proposed carrier-based advanced jet trainer for the United States Navy Undergraduate Jet Training System (UJTS) competition to replace the T-45 Goshawk. "ITS" stands for "Integrated Training System". Leonardo is collaborating with Textron Aviation in the pitch. It is competing with the Lockheed Martin-KAI TF-50N and a navalised variant of the Boeing-Saab AB T-7 Red Hawk.
M-346FGA (Fighter Ground Attack)
Designation of multirole variant used for the Nigerian Air Force.

== Operators ==
Operators of the M-346 (in blue)

=== Current operators ===
==== Training aircraft ====
Greece (10 in service)
The Hellenic Air Force has ten M-346 Block 5+ "Silver Hawks". The first two delivered in May 2023, all delivered by September 2025.
Israel (30)
The Israeli Air Force (IAF) has 30 trainers in operation, locally designated M-346i "Lavi". Ordered in 2012, delivered from 2014.
The deal was made with common interest, Italy ordered three Israeli Gulfstream E-550A CAEW AEW&C aircraft and reconnaissance satellites being built by Israel Aerospace Industries.
Italy (22 in service, 20 on order)
Italy operates 42 T-346, in two different categories:
- Italian Air Force
  - 6 T-346A ordered in June 2009
  - 3 T-346A ordered in December 2014
  - 9 T-346A ordered in March 2016, all delivered by February 2018
  - 20 ordered in December 2024:
    - 5 T-346A for training
    - 15 T-346 PAN ordered in September 2024 for the Frecce Tricolori
- International Flight Training School (run by the Italian Air Force and Leonardo)
  - 4 T-346A belonging to Leonardo delivered as of May 2020
Poland (16 delivered, 1 crashed)
The Polish Air Force received 16 aircraft, designated M-346 "Bielik" (operated at 41st Training Air Base in Dęblin)
- Eight ordered in 2014 with an option for four aircraft, delivered between November 2016 and October 2017
- Four contracted in March 2018 with an option for four aircraft, delivered between October and November 2020
- Four contracted in February 2021, delivered in December 2022
Of the 16 delivered, 1 crashed in 2024.
Qatar (6)
The Qatar Emiri Air Force (QEAF) operates six M-346 trainers as part of an agreement in 2010 with Leonardo and the Italian Air Force to be used at the International Flight Training School for Phase 4 training for Qatari pilots.
- Three delivered as of January 2022
- All delivered as of 2024
Singapore (12)
The Republic of Singapore Air Force (RSAF) has twelve trainers in service, based in Cazaux Air Base, France (Advanced Jet Trainer Programme) The order was made in September 2010 and the delivery in 2013-2014.
Turkmenistan (6)
The Turkmen Air Force ordered four M-346 FA and two M-346DR/FT.

=== Orders ===
Austria (12 on order, 12 on option)
The Austrian Air Force ordered twelve M-346FA. Deliveries will be in two batches of six aircraft and, in addition, there are options for two further batches of six aircraft each. In the ex ante notice by the Italian Ministry of Defense it is specified that the order will include armaments such as the 20mm Nexter gun pod, LAU32 rocket launchers, active self-protection SPEAR AECM EW pods from Elbit Systems, Full Mission Simulators and the integration of the Link 16 and the Air-to-air IRIS-T missile.
Canada (6 on order)
ITPS Canada ordered six M-346T Block 20 trainers in May 2026.
Indonesia (12 on order)
The Indonesian Air Force ordered twelve M-346F Block 20 in July 2026, with delivery expected to start in 2030.
Nigeria (24 on order)
In 2021, the Nigerian Air Force ordered twelve M-346FA (+ twelve options). The deal was reportedly $1.2 billion for twenty-four M-346 aircraft. In October 2024, it was confirmed that the order was for twenty-four aircraft, deliveries were expected to begin in early 2025.

== Accidents and incidents ==
- On 11 May 2013, an Alenia-operated M-346 crashed near the village of Piana Crixia, in Val Bormida, between the provinces of Cuneo and Savona, Italy, during a test flight. The pilot was able to eject successfully and survived the crash, but received serious injuries after jumping from the tree where his parachute had been entangled. The type was grounded for more than three months while the cause of the crash was investigated.
- On 12 July 2024, a Polish Air Force M-346 "Bielik" crashed near Gdynia. The pilot, major Robert Jeł was killed.

== Exports to Israel ==
Since the outbreak of the Gaza war in October 2023, exports of equipment relating to the M-346 have become the subject of political and legal scrutiny in both Italy and the United Kingdom.

=== Opposition in Italy and the United Kingdom ===
In Italy, opposition politicians and campaign organisations questioned whether components, support services or aircraft supplied to the Israeli Air Force were compatible with the Italian government's stated restrictions on military exports to Israel. Leonardo stated that the M-346 aircraft supplied to Israel had been delivered under earlier agreements and that it complied with applicable export control legislation.

In October 2026, Italian-language news outlet Anbamed published allegations from BDS that over 400 shipments of military aircraft parts had taken place from Leonardo's facility in Lonate Pozzolo to various Elbit locations in Israel, with many of the shipments being for M-346 components. In particular, it highlighted that a 105kg Auxiliary Power Unit for the M-346 was about to be transported by Lufthansa from Milan Malpensa Airport to Tel-Aviv and called on the authorities to prevent the shipment going ahead. Leonardo and Elbit declined to comment on the allegations.

In the United Kingdom, parliamentary questions, legal proceedings and media investigations examined the export of UK-manufactured components for the M-346, including parts produced by Moog Wolverhampton Ltd, a subsidiary of US aerospace and defence company Moog Inc.. Following the suspension of a number of UK export licences to Israel in September 2024, campaigners argued that some components continued to reach Israel, prompting further public debate over the operation of UK export controls.

=== Protests at manufacturing sites ===
Manufacturing sites associated with the M-346 supply chain have also been targeted by pro-Palestinian protests and direct action. On 26 August 2025, four protesters entered the Moog facility in Wolverhampton and occupied the roof of the factory. The group said that it had targeted the site because Moog manufactured aircraft components exported to Israel for the M-346, which is used by the Israeli Air Force to train pilots for F-15, F-16 and F-35 aircraft. Police reported damage to skylights and solar panels, and four people were arrested.

The four activists were subsequently charged with criminal damage and conspiracy to commit criminal damage. In October 2025, Moog obtained an injunction restricting protest activity at a number of its British facilities, citing the Wolverhampton action and the risk of further disruption. The criminal case against the four defendants, sometimes referred to as the "Moog 4", came to trial at Birmingham Crown Court in June 2026. The jury was discharged after failing to reach verdicts, and a retrial was subsequently scheduled.

=== Belgian seizures and allegations of illegal military exports ===
In April 2026, Belgian authorities reported the interception of shipments of military-related equipment at Liège Airport that had originated in the United Kingdom and were destined for Israel. Belgian media reported that the cargo was inspected following concerns that it contained controlled military items, and that a criminal investigation had been opened to determine whether export control or transit regulations had been breached.

According to Walloon minister-president, Adrien Dolimont, “We have to see if the legislation has been respected. Here, in this case, it’s clear that it hasn’t. No transit licence was requested; if it had been, it would have been refused”.

Statements from the Belgian government and media reports identified one of the seized shipments as coming from Moog's Wolverhampton factory and bound for Israel's M-346 program, with the shipment being consolidated with civilian goods including hearing aid batteries, music amplifiers and fingerprint imaging machines. The outcome of the criminal investigation was expected to be announced in August 2026.

== Specifications (M-346) ==
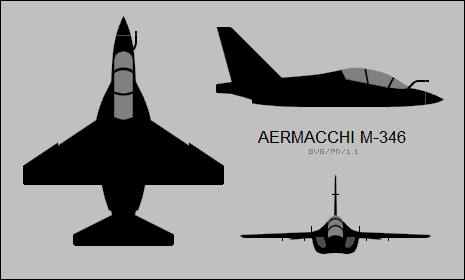
Orthographic projection of the Alenia Aermacchi M-346 Master

Video of a M-346 in flight, 2011

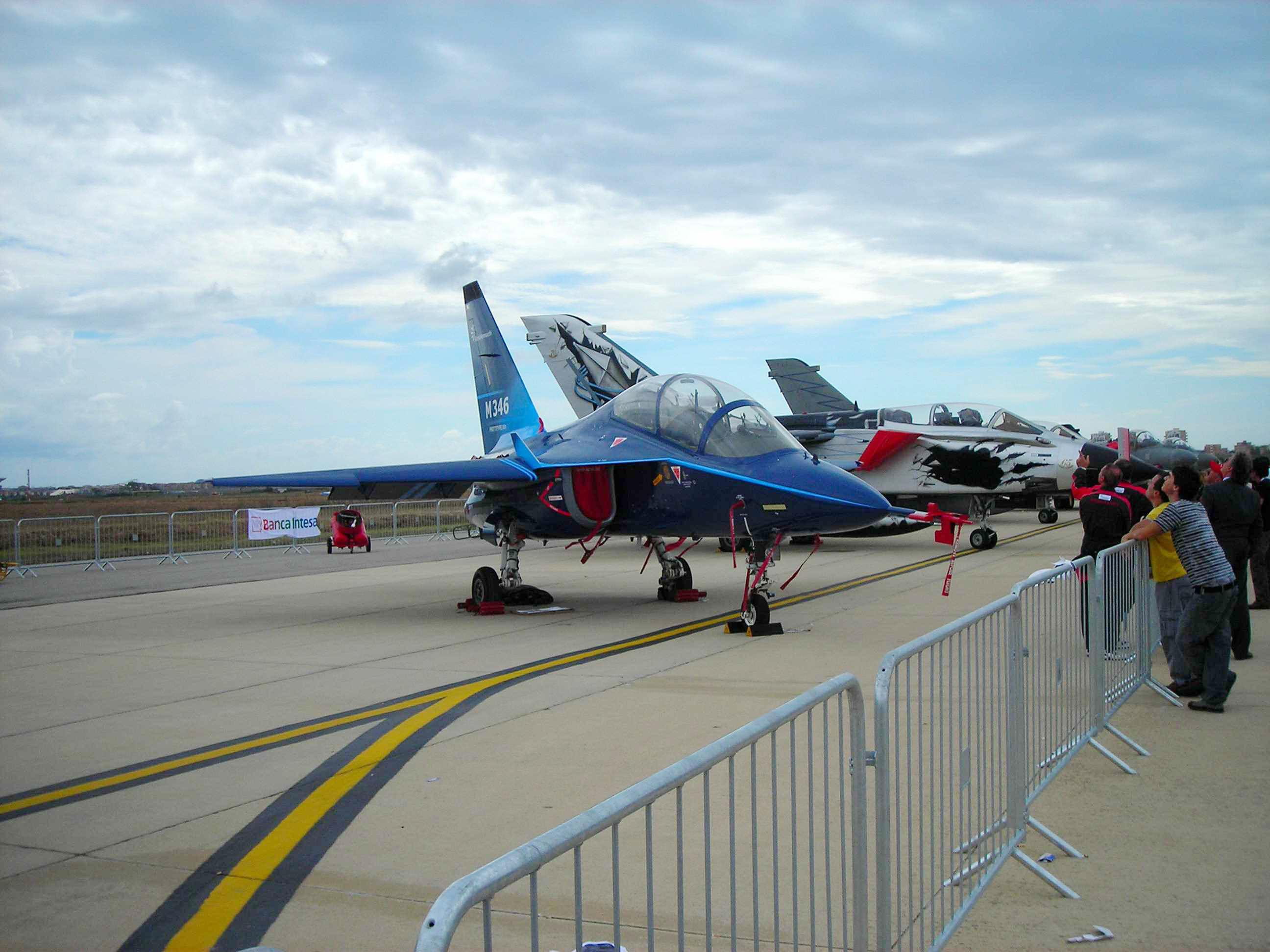
An M-346 at "Giornata Azzurra" 2006 at Pratica di Mare AFB, Italy

Data from Alenia Aermacchi; Leonardo

General characteristics

- Crew: 2
- Length: 11.49 m (37 ft 8 in)
- Wingspan: 9.72 m (31 ft 11 in)
- Height: 4.76 m (15 ft 7 in)
- Wing area: 23.52 m^{2} (253.2 sq ft)
- Empty weight: 4,900 kg (10,803 lb)
- Gross weight: 6,700 kg (14,771 lb)
- Max takeoff weight: 9,600 kg (21,164 lb) trainer
- Fuel capacity: 2,000 kg (4,409 lb) internal
- Powerplant: 2 × Honeywell/ITEC F124-GA-200 turbofan engines, 28 kN (6,300 lbf) thrust each

Performance

- Maximum speed: 1,090 km/h (680 mph, 590 kn)
- Maximum speed: Mach 0.95
- Stall speed: 176 km/h (109 mph, 95 kn)
- Never exceed speed: 1,470 km/h (910 mph, 790 kn) / M1.2
- Range: 1,925 km (1,196 mi, 1,039 nmi)
- Ferry range: 2,550 km (1,580 mi, 1,380 nmi) with 3 external drop tanks
- Endurance: 2 hours 45 minutes (4 hours with external drop tanks)
- Service ceiling: 13,716 m (45,000 ft)
- g limits: +8 -3
- Rate of climb: 112 m/s (22,000 ft/min)
- Wing loading: 285 kg/m^{2} (58 lb/sq ft)
- Thrust/weight: 0.84

Armament

- Hardpoints: Provision for a total of seven pylon stations (one× under-fuselage, four× under-wing plus two× wingtip), capable of mounting up to 3,000 kilograms (6,600 lb) of external payload and up to three× 630 litres (140 imp gal; 170 US gal) external drop tanks (only under-fuselage and two inward wing pylons are wet-plumbed)
  - Gun pods:
    - FN Herstal HMP250 12.7mm machine gun
    - Nexter 20mm M621 cannon
  - Air-to-air missiles:
    - AIM-9 Sidewinder
    - I-Derby ER
    - IRIS-T
  - Air-to-surface missiles:
    - AGM-65 Maverick air-to-ground missile
  - Anti-ship missiles:
    - Marte MK-2A anti-ship missiles
  - Mark 82 500lb and Mark-83 1,000lb free-fall or retarded bombs

Avionics

- Radar: Grifo-M346 radar (M-346FA)

== See also ==
Related development

- Yakovlev Yak-130

Aircraft of comparable role, configuration, and era

- AIDC T-5 Brave Eagle
- Boeing T-7 Red Hawk
- Hongdu L-15
- KAI T-50 Golden Eagle
- TAI Hürjet
