= List of Bomb Live Units =

Bomb Live Unit is:

"Standard nomenclature in accordance with MIL-STD 875 for bombs used by the Air Force, Navy and Marine Corps. These bombs can be configured as high explosives, chemical and pyrotechnic." - (U.S. Army Corps of Engineers EE/CA Addendum, Former Buckley Field, 1/98)

"When installed on a bomb, the JDAM kit is given a GBU (Guided Bomb Unit) nomenclature, superseding the MK-80 or BLU (Bomb, Live Unit) nomenclature of the bomb to which it is attached." - PeaceWorks Kansas City

Notable Bomb Live Units (see:) include:

- BLU-3
- BLU-3 Pineapple
- BLU-14
- BLU-26
- BLU-36
- BLU-43
- BLU-43 Dragontooth
- BLU-80
- BLU-80/B
- BLU-80/B Bigeye
- BLU-80/B Bigeye bomb
- BLU-82
- BLU-82B
- BLU-82 Commando Vault "Daisy Cutter"
- BLU-97/B
- BLU-97/B Combined Effect Bomb
- BLU-97/B Combined Effect Bomblets
- BLU-107
- BLU-107 Durandal
- BLU-108
- BLU-108/B
- BLU-108 Sensor Fuzed Weapon
- BLU-109
- BLU-109 bomb
- BLU-110
- BLU-111
- BLU-114/B
- BLU-116
- BLU-117
- BLU-118
- BLU-127

== See also ==
- Lists of weapons
