= Blu =

Blu or BLU may refer to:

== Businesses and brands ==
- Blu (Italian company), a telecommunications company
- Blu Manga, an imprint of Tokyopop
- blu eCigs, a brand of electronic cigarette owned by Imperial Tobacco
- BLU Products, an American mobile phone manufacturer

== Fictional entities ==
- Blu (Monica's Gang), from the Brazilian comic strip
- Quadra Blu, from Max Rep comics
- Blu, from the Rio franchise
- BLU, a playable faction in Team Fortress 2 video game

== Music ==
- Blu (album), by Giorgia, 2023
- "Blu", song by Mura Masa from Mura Masa, 2017
- "Blu", song by Aidan from This Is Aidan, 2023

== People ==
- Blu (artist), Italian artist
- Blu (rapper) (Johnson Barnes III, born 1983), American rapper
- David Blu (David Bluthenthal, born 1980), American–Israeli basketball player
- Françoise Ballet-Blu (born 1964), French politician
- Susan Blu (Susan Maria Blue, born 1948), American voice actress and casting director
- Blu Cantrell (born 1976), American singer
- Blu del Barrio (born 1997), American actor
- Blu Greenberg (Bluma Genauer, born 1936), American writer
- Blu Hunt (born 1995), American actress

== Other uses ==
- Boland-Lecky-Ussher building complex, Trinity College Dublin#Library

== Munitions ==
- Bomb Live Unit, a munition, see: and:
- BLU-3
- BLU-3 Pineapple
- BLU-14
- BLU-26
- BLU-36
- BLU-43
- BLU-43 Dragontooth
- BLU-80
- BLU-80/B
- BLU-80/B Bigeye
- BLU-80/B Bigeye bomb
- BLU-82
- BLU-82B
- BLU-82 Commando Vault "Daisy Cutter"
- BLU-97/B
- BLU-97/B Combined Effect Bomb
- BLU-97/B Combined Effect Bomblets
- BLU-107
- BLU-107 Durandal
- BLU-108
- BLU-108/B
- BLU-108 Sensor Fuzed Weapon
- BLU-109
- BLU-109 bomb
- BLU-110
- BLU-111
- BLU-114/B
- BLU-116
- BLU-117
- BLU-118
- BLU-127

== See also ==
- Blue (disambiguation)
- Blu-ray, a digital optical disc data storage format
- Blu Tack, a reusable putty-like pressure-sensitive adhesive
- TheBlu, digital media franchise founded in 2011
- Radisson Blu, a hotel brand
