= Works by Jesse Eisenberg =

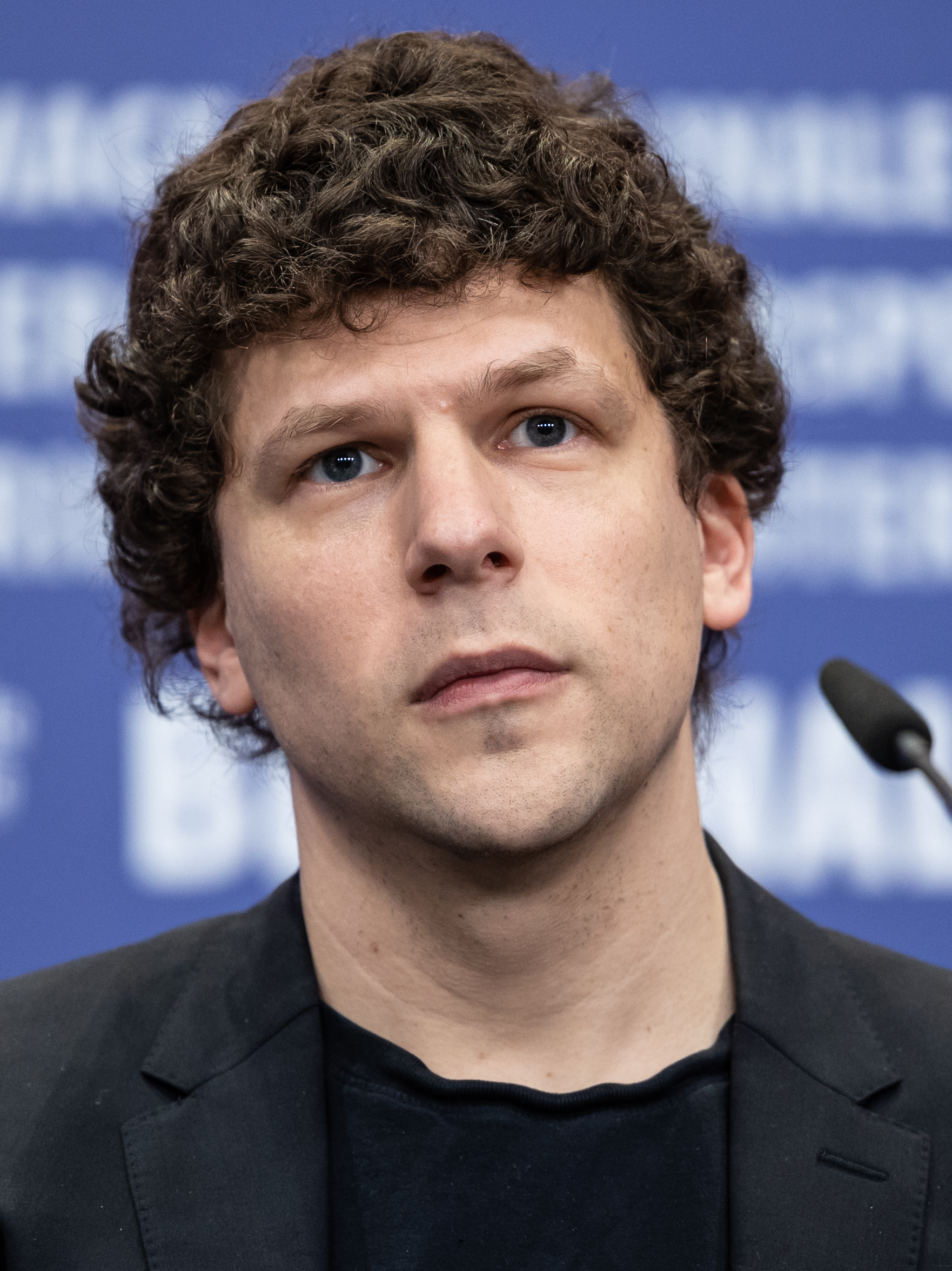
Eisenberg at the 73rd Berlin International Film Festival in 2023

Jesse Eisenberg is an American actor, playwright, and filmmaker known for his work on stage and screen. He began his career as a child with regular and understudy roles in Broadway and off-Broadway theater productions. During his senior year of high school at the Professional Performing Arts School, Eisenberg starred in the independent comedy-drama film Roger Dodger (2002), which earned a nomination for the Gotham Independent Film Award for Breakthrough Performer.

In 2005, Eisenberg appeared in Wes Craven's horror comedy Cursed and Noah Baumbach's drama The Squid and the Whale. He starred opposite Richard Gere and Terrence Howard as a young Hasidic Jewish man involved in the ecstasy smuggling trade in the comic thriller The Hunting Party (2007). After leading the comedies Adventureland and Zombieland (both 2009), Eisenberg was nominated for the Academy Award for Best Actor for his portrayal of Facebook founder Mark Zuckerberg in David Fincher's The Social Network (2010). He then starred in the Rio franchise (2011–present) and the Now You See Me film series (2013–present), while working with Woody Allen on the romantic comedies To Rome with Love (2012) and Café Society (2016). He later portrayed Lex Luthor in the superhero films Batman v Superman: Dawn of Justice (2016), Justice League (2017), and Zack Snyder's Justice League (2021).

Before starring in the television miniseries Fleishman Is in Trouble, Eisenberg made his feature directorial debut with the comedy-drama film When You Finish Saving the World (2022). He then wrote, directed, and starred opposite Kieran Culkin in the buddy comedy A Real Pain (2024), which earned him a BAFTA Award for Best Original Screenplay as well as nomination for the Academy Award in the same category. In literature, Eisenberg is a contributing writer for The New Yorker and Timothy McSweeney's Quarterly Concern; his humor essays have also appeared in Harper's Magazine and The New York Times. He has narrated numerous audiobooks and wrote several plays for the New York stage and the West End.

== Film ==
Year	Title	Role	Notes	Ref.
2001	Lightning: Fire from the Sky	Eric Dobbs	Television film	
2002	Roger Dodger	Nick		
2002	The Emperor's Club	Louis Masoudi		
2004	The Village	Jamison		
2005	The Squid and the Whale	Walt Berkman		
2005	Cursed	Jimmy Myers		
2007	The Education of Charlie Banks	Charlie Banks		
2007	The Living Wake	Mills Joaquin		
2007	One Day Like Rain	Mark		
2007	The Hunting Party	Benjamin Strauss		
2009	Some Boys Don't Leave	Boy	Short film	
2009	Adventureland	James Brennan		
2009	Beyond All Boundaries	Lt. Fiske Hanley / Sgt. Benjamin McKinney	Voice, short film	
2009	Zombieland	Columbus		
2009	Solitary Man	Daniel Cheston		
2010	Holy Rollers	Sam Gold		
2010	Camp Hell	Daniel Jacobs		
2010	The Social Network	Mark Zuckerberg		
2011	Rio	Blu	Voice	
2011	30 Minutes or Less	Nick Davis		
2012	Why Stop Now	Eli Bloom		
2012	To Rome with Love	Jack		
2012	Free Samples	Tex		
2013	He's Way More Famous Than You	Himself	Cameo	
2013	Now You See Me	J. Daniel Atlas		
2013	Night Moves	Josh Stamos		
2013	The Double	Simon James / James Simon		
2014	Rio 2	Blu	Voice	
2015	The End of the Tour	David Lipsky		
2015	Louder Than Bombs	Jonah		
2015	American Ultra	Mike Howell		
2016	Batman v Superman: Dawn of Justice	Lex Luthor		
2016	Café Society	Bobby Dorfman		
2016	Now You See Me 2	J. Daniel Atlas		
2017	Justice League	Lex Luthor	Cameo, post-credits scene	
2018	The Hummingbird Project	Vincent Zaleski		
2019	The Art of Self-Defense	Casey Davies		
2019	Vivarium	Tom	Also executive producer	
2019	Zombieland: Double Tap	Columbus		
2020	Resistance	Marcel Marceau		
2021	Wild Indian	Jerry	Also executive producer	
2021	Zack Snyder's Justice League	Lex Luthor	Director's cut of Justice League	
2023	Manodrome	Ralphie		
2024	Sasquatch Sunset	Male Sasquatch	Also producer	
2024	A Real Pain	David Kaplan	Also director, writer and producer	
2025	Now You See Me: Now You Don't	J. Daniel Atlas		
2026	Minions & Monsters	Dort	Voice	
2026	The Debut	Todd	Also director, writer and producer	

=== Filmmaking credits ===
Year	Title	Work			Note	Ref.
Year	Title	Director	Writer	Producer	Note	Ref.
2018	The World Before Your Feet	No	No	Executive		
2022	When You Finish Saving the World	Yes	Yes	No		
2023	I'll Be Right There	No	No	Executive		
2024	A Real Pain	Yes	Yes	Yes		
2024	Secret Mall Apartment	No	No	Executive		
2026	The Debut	Yes	Yes	Yes		

== Television ==
Year	Title	Role	Notes	Ref.
1999–2000	Get Real	Kenny Green	22 episodes	
2011	Saturday Night Live	Himself (host)	Episode: "Jesse Eisenberg / Nicki Minaj"	
2012	The Newsroom	Eric Neal (voice)	Episode: "We Just Decided To", uncredited	
2014	Modern Family	Asher	Episode: "Under Pressure"	
2018	Žigosani u reketu	Owner of an NBA club	Episode #1.9	
2019	Live in Front of a Studio Audience	David Brewster	Episode: "All in the Family and Good Times"	
2022	Fleishman Is in Trouble	Toby Fleishman	8 episodes	

== Theatre ==
Year	Title	Role	Theatre	Notes	Ref.
1996	Summer and Smoke	Young John (understudy)	Criterion Center Stage Right		
1999	The Gathering	Michael	Playhouse 91	Credited as Jesse Adam Eisenberg	
2005	Orphans	Phillip	Greenway Court Theatre	Workshop production	
2007	Scarcity	Billy	Linda Gross Theater		
2011	Asuncion	Edgar	Cherry Lane Theatre	Also playwright	
2013	The Revisionist	David	Cherry Lane Theatre	Also playwright	
2015	The Final Interrogation of Ceausescu's Dog	Man	Playing on Air	Podcast	
2015	The Spoils	Ben	Pershing Square Signature Center; The Alice Griffin Jewel Box Theatre	Also playwright, Off-Broadway run	
2015	A Little Part of All of Us	Joey	Playing on Air	Also writer, podcast	
2016	The Blizzard	Neil	Playing on Air	Podcast	
2016	The Spoils	Ben	Trafalgar Studios	Also playwright, West End debut	
2016	Oh, Hello	Himself (guest)	Lyceum Theatre	Cameo during the #2much2na segment	
2017	The People Speak	Cast member	Arie Crown Theater	Part of the People's Summit	
2017	Shoshana and Her Lovers	—N/a	United Artists Theater	Playwright and composer only, part of The 24 Hour Musicals: Los Angeles	
2019	Happy Talk	—N/a	Pershing Square Signature Center; The Alice Griffin Jewel Box Theatre	Playwright only	
2024	Titanic	Frank Carlson	Encores! at New York City Center	Cameo during the June 12 performance	

== Audiobooks ==
Year	Title	Role	Notes	Ref.
2004	The Gospel According to Larry	Narrator		
2004	Vote for Larry	Narrator		
2005	Be More Chill	Narrator		
2010	White Cat: The Curse Workers, Book One	Narrator		
2011	Red Glove: The Curse Workers, Book Two	Narrator		
2012	Black Heart: The Curse Workers, Book Third	Narrator		
2012	Colin Fischer	Narrator		
2015	Bream Gives Me Hiccups: And Other Stories	Narrator	Also writer	
2018	The Paris Review (episode 9, "God")	Frat Boy	Podcast	
2020	When You Finish Saving the World	Nathan Katz	Audible original, also writer	

== Bibliography ==
=== Short stories and humor pieces ===
- "Marv Albert is my therapist". Shouts & Murmurs. The New Yorker. March 18, 2013.
- "Men and dancing". Shouts & Murmurs. The New Yorker. 91 (14): 33. May 25, 2015.
- "An honest film review". Shouts & Murmurs. The New Yorker. 91 (37): 57. November 23, 2015.

=== From The New Yorker ===
Title	Date of publication	Department	Medium	Ref.
"I Didn't Win Any Pulitzer Prizes This Year"	April 17, 2013	Daily Shouts	Web	
"A Marriage Counselor Tries to Heckle at a Knicks Game"	April 25, 2013	Daily Shouts	Web	
"Separation-Anxiety Sleepaway Camp"	July 1, 2013	Shouts & Murmurs	Print	
"My Mother Explains the Ballet to Me"	July 10, 2013	Daily Shouts	Web	
"A Short Story Written with Thought-To-Text Technology"	August 15, 2013	Daily Shouts	Web	
"A Bully Does His Research"	September 9, 2013	Daily Shouts	Web	
"Final Conversations at Pompeii"	October 7, 2013	Shouts & Murmurs	Print	
"If I Was Fluent In ..."	January 13, 2014	Shouts & Murmurs	Print	
"Carmelo Anthony and I Debrief Our Friends After a Pickup Game at the YMCA"	June 10, 2014	Daily Shouts	Web	
"My Nephew Has Some Questions"	September 1, 2015	Daily Shouts	Web	
"Why I Broke Up with the Little Mermaid"	February 12, 2016	Daily Shouts	Web	
"My Cousin Recently Became a Realtor"	May 19, 2016	Daily Shouts	Web	
"Low Talk in High Places"	December 11, 2016	Daily Shouts	Web	
"You Never Really Know"	January 16, 2017	Shouts & Murmurs	Web	
"My N.B.A. Knowledge Comes In Handy"	May 14, 2018	Shouts & Murmurs	Print	

=== From McSweeney's ===
Title	Date of publication	Medium	Ref.
"Manageable Tongue Twisters"	November 30, 2009	Web	
"Marxist-Socialist Jokes"	February 24, 2010	Web	
"A Post Gender Normative Man Tries to Pick Up a Woman at a Bar"	December 28, 2011	Web	
"Jeremy Lin Has Helped Me Through Some Pretty Tough Times"	February 15, 2012	Web	
"Bream Gives Me Hiccups: Restaurant Reviews from a Privileged Nine-Year-Old: Masgouf"	June 6, 2012	Web	
"Bream Gives Me Hiccups: Restaurant Reviews from a Privileged Nine-Year-Old: The Whiskey Blue Bar at the W Hotel"	July 9, 2012	Web	
"Bream Gives Me Hiccups: Restaurant Reviews from a Privileged Nine-Year-Old: Tcby"	August 1, 2012	Web	
"Bream Gives Me Hiccups: Restaurant Reviews from a Privileged Nine-Year-Old: Robert Frost Elementary School Cafeteria"	August 20, 2012	Web	
"Bream Gives Me Hiccups: Restaurant Reviews from a Privileged Nine-Year-Old: Organix vs. the San Gennaro Street Festival"	October 2, 2012	Web	
"Bream Gives Me Hiccups: Restaurant Reviews from a Privileged Nine-Year-Old: Thanksgiving With Vegans"	November 11, 2012	Web	
"Body Rituals Among the Lauxesortem"	December 11, 2012	Web	
"Bream Gives Me Hiccups: Restaurant Reviews from a Privileged Nine-Year-Old: Matthew's House"	February 22, 2013	Web	
"Bream Gives Me Hiccups: Restaurant Reviews from a Privileged Nine-Year-Old: Fuddruckers and an Unreliable New Friend"	June 3, 2013	Web	
"Bream Gives Me Hiccups: Restaurant Reviews from a Privileged Nine-Year-Old: A Crawfish Boil and Dad's New Family"	August 6, 2013	Web	
"A Post Gender Normative Woman Tries to Pick Up a Man at a Bar"	October 2, 2013	Web	
"Bream Gives Me Hiccups: Restaurant Reviews from a Privileged Nine-Year-Old: The Museum of Natural History and Making Compromises"	November 1, 2013	Web	
"Alexander Graham Bell's First Five Phone Calls"	November 12, 2013	Web	
"Bream Gives Me Hiccups: Restaurant Reviews from a Privileged Nine-Year-Old: The Ashram and Mom"	December 12, 2013	Web	
"Bream Gives Me Hiccups: Restaurant Reviews from a Privileged Nine-Year-Old: Sushi Nozawa"	September 17, 2015	Web	
"Self-Deprecating Heroes"	November 4, 2016	Web	

=== Collections ===
Title	Date of publication	Publisher	Ref.
Bream Gives Me Hiccups: And Other Stories	September 8, 2015	Grove Press, New York	

=== Other ===
Title	Date of publication	Notes	Ref.
"What if I hadn't written that fan letter to Dan Majerle in April 1993?"	May 2018	Published in Upon Further Review, a collection of sports what-if short stories compiled by editor Mike Pesca	

=== Plays ===
Title	Year of publication	Publisher	Ref.
Asuncion	2011	Dramatists Play Service, New York	
The Revisionist	2013	Grove Press, New York	
The Spoils	2015	Grove Press, New York	
A Little Part of All of Us	2015	Playing on Air	

== See also ==
- List of awards and nominations received by Jesse Eisenberg
