= GBU =

GBU may refer to:

== Organizations ==
- Air Bissau (ICAO code: GBU), the national airline of Guinea-Bissau
- Football Association of Greenland (Grønlands Boldspil-Union), the governing body of association football in the island country of Greenland
- Gabriel Resources (TSX-V code: GBU), a Canadian resource company
- Gaston Berger University, the second university established in Senegal
- Gautam Buddha University, a university established by the Uttar Pradesh Gautam Buddha University Act 2002
- Groupes Bibliques Universitaires, student groups that meet at universities or nearby for in-depth Bible study

== Precision-guided munitions "Guided Bomb Unit" ==
- GBU-10 Paveway II, an American Paveway-series laser-guided bomb
- GBU-12 Paveway II, an American aerial laser-guided bomb
- GBU-15, an unpowered, glide weapon
- GBU-16 Paveway II, an American Paveway-series laser-guided bomb
- GBU-24 Paveway III, a family of laser-guided bombs
- GBU-28, a 5,000-pound laser-guided "bunker busting" bomb
- GBU-27 Paveway III, a laser-guided bomb with bunker buster capabilities
- GBU-37 GPS-Aided Munition, a GPS-Aided Munition developed for use with the B-2 Bomber
- GBU-39 Small Diameter Bomb, a 250 lb precision-guided glide bomb
- GBU-43/B MOAB, a large-yield bomb
- GBU-44/B Viper Strike, a GPS-aided laser-guided variant of the Northrop Grumman Brilliant Anti-Tank munition
- GBU-53/B, an American air-launched, precision-guided glide bomb
- GBU-57A/B MOP, a 30,000-pound (13,600 kg)-class precision-guided "bunker buster" bomb developed for the United States Air Force (USAF)

== Other ==
- The Good, the Bad and the Ugly - 1966 Spaghetti western film
- Good Bad Ugly - 2025 Indian film
- Countermine System (also GBU-61), an anti-land-mine system consisting of chemical or explosive projectiles
- Gaagudju language (ISO 639-3 code: gbu), an extinct Australian Aboriginal language
- GBU Indoor Stadium, an indoor stadium located in the campus of Gautam Buddha University
