= The Mummy Demastered =

2017 Metroidvania video game by WayForward

- Developer: WayForward Technologies
- Publisher: WayForward Technologies
- Directors: Austin Ivansmith; Matt Bozon
- Producer: Glenn Seidel
- Designers: Tomm Hulett; Austin Ivansmith
- Programmer: John Eric Hart
- Artist: Damon DuBois
- Writer: Tomm Hulett
- Composer: Gavin Allen
- Engine: Unity
- Platforms: Microsoft Windows; Nintendo Switch; PlayStation 4 Xbox One; Amazon Luna
- Release: Windows, Switch, PS4, Xbox One; October 24, 2017; Amazon Luna; October 20, 2020
- Genre: Metroidvania
- Mode: Single-player

The Mummy Demastered is a 2017 Metroidvania video game developed by WayForward Technologies and based on the 2017 film The Mummy. It takes place concurrently with the events of the film, with players playing as an unnamed Prodigium soldier under the command of Dr. Henry Jekyll (with the likeness of Russell Crowe from the film) who must fight the evil forces of Princess Ahmanet (with the likeness of Sofia Boutella). The game was released for Windows, PlayStation 4, and Xbox One in October 2017. The Nintendo Switch version was released in Japan on July 30, 2020, while a version for Amazon Luna was released on October 20 of the same year. The game received positive reviews.

== Gameplay ==
The Mummy Demastered is a Metroidvania-style game where players traverse a large map which opens up to the player as they make progress in the game. Upon dying the game resets the player as a new character, who then must retrieve their items from a zombified version of their former selves.

The player's character is a soldier who works for Prodigium, as they follow Princess Ahmanet and battle her monsters, before eventually defeating her and Set in the final battle. There are two endings in this game, each of which are determined by the player's survival in their escape from the collapsing tomb. A third ending is seen if the player hasn't died in the save file, thus never having created a new character.

In terms of the Metroidvania genre, Destructoid noted that the game seems to more closely resemble later side scrolling Castlevania games as opposed to Super Metroid, with GameSpot noting that it also seemingly takes influence from Ghosts 'n Goblins.

== Development ==
Pre-production of The Mummy Demastered began in early November 2016. Austin Ivansmith, the game's director, wrote a game design document using the pitch they gave to Universal Brand Development and information based on the movie. Meanwhile, the lead programmer began working on a platforming engine and relevant support tools for it. The artists also began working on concept art for the game. They got tens of thousands of photos from the set of the film, using 2000 of them as references for backgrounds and characters before they began working on the game. Development began in January 2017. The game was designed from the start to be a side story to the film, as this allowed them more freedom. The game was originally meant to be released alongside the film, but was delayed by a couple months in order to make it what the game developers wanted for the final version.

== Reception ==
Reception

Aggregate score
Aggregator	Score
Metacritic	PC: 78/100; PS4: 75/100; XONE: 73/100; NS: 75/100

Review scores
Publication	Score
Destructoid	7.5/10
GameSpot	7/10
Nintendo Life	9/10
Nintendo World Report	6/10

The Mummy Demastered received "generally positive" reviews for Microsoft Windows, PlayStation 4, and Nintendo Switch and "mixed or average" reviews for Xbox One, with critics praising WayForward's pixel art and mastery of the Metroidvania genre, while also noting it as a massive improvement over the film it was based on.

== Comparison to Aliens Infestation ==
Critics and fans noted that The Mummy Demastered shares strong spiritual DNA with WayForward's earlier licensed Metroidvania, Aliens Infestation (2011). Both games feature a respawn system where the player controls a rotating cast of expendable soldiers, and both were praised for elevating their licensed source material through strong game design. The connection was widely cited as evidence of WayForward's particular skill in adapting action-horror IP into the Metroidvania format.
