= Dylan Kussman =

American film and television writer and actor (born 1961)

- Born: January 21, 1971 (age 55); Los Angeles, California, U.S.
- Education: University of California, Berkeley
- Occupations: Actor; screenwriter
- Years active: 1987–present

Dylan Kussman (born January 21, 1971) is an American film and television writer and actor. He played the part of Richard Cameron in the film Dead Poets Society (1989) and Dr. Allen Painter in The Way of the Gun (2000). He has also appeared in such films as Wild Hearts Can't Be Broken (1991), X2 (2003), Leatherheads (2008), Flight (2012) and Jack Reacher (2012), and is the writer, director and star of the online noir drama The Steps. He also co-wrote the screenplay for the 2017 Tom Cruise film The Mummy. In 2019, he appeared in the Clint Eastwood film Richard Jewell.

== Early life ==
Kussman was born and raised in Los Angeles, California. He attended the University of California, Berkeley.

== Filmography ==
=== Film ===
Year	Title	Role	Notes
1989	Dead Poets Society	Richard Cameron	
1991	Shogun Warrior	Smitty	
1991	Wild Hearts Can't Be Broken	Clifford Henderson	
1996	93 Million Miles from the Sun	Eddie	
2000	The Way of the Gun	Dr. Allen Painter	
2003	X2	Stryker Soldier Wilkins	
2006	Monday	Neighbor	
2006	Ten 'til Noon	Rush	
2007	One Day Like Rain	Mick	
2008	Leatherheads	Soldier Frank	
2012	Jayne Mansfield's Car	Milton	Uncredited
2012	Flight	Two Beer Barry	
2012	Jack Reacher	Gary	
2014	The Salience Project	Quincy	
2017	The Mummy	Writer Tech	
2018	The Mule	Sheriff	
2019	Richard Jewell	FBI Special Agent Bruce Hughes	

=== Television ===
Year	Title	Role	Notes
1987	Silver Spoons	Elliott	Episode: "Rumors Are Flying"
1988	Day by Day	Billy	Episode: "That Saturday Feeling"
1988	Punky Brewster	Harold	Episode: "Going to Camp"
1988	Days of Our Lives	Christopher Brachman	1 episode
1989	Married... with Children	Butch	Episode: "A Three Job, No Income Family"
1990	Life Goes On	Mark	Episode: "The Bicycle Thief"
1996	Nash Bridges	Marvin	Episode: "Hit Parade"
2000	The X-Files	Med Student	Episode: "Theef"
2000	The Fugitive	Garrett 'Gary' Davis	2 episodes
2001	Roswell	Brian	Episode: "Control"
2002	My Sister's Keeper	Leon	TV movie
2004	Wild Things 2	Irvin Brillman	Television film
2005	Monk	Deputy Paul Coby	Episode: "Mr. Monk Gets Cabin Fever"
2005	House	Mr. Carroll	Episode: "Kids"
2007	Cold Case	Cliff Burrell (1987)	Episode: "Offender"
2008	Without a Trace	Patrick	Episode: "Last Call"
2010	Memphis Beat	TJ Williams	Episode: "It's Alright, Mama"
2010	Drop Dead Diva	Frank	Episode: "Begin Again"
2010	One Tree Hill	Attorney	3 episodes
2020	Dwight in Shining Armor	Angus Pewlet	Episode: "Just Desserts"
