= One Day Like Rain =

- Directed by: Paul Todisco
- Written by: Paul Todisco
- Produced by: Jeff Beard; Paul Todisco; Chris Aronoff
- Starring: Samantha Figura; Marina Resa; Jesse Eisenberg
- Cinematography: Douglas W. Shannon
- Edited by: Steven Sprung
- Production company: Life on Mars Productions
- Release date: June 2007 (Seattle)
- Running time: 87 minutes
- Country: United States
- Language: English

One Day Like Rain is a 2007 American science fiction drama film written and directed by Paul Todisco and starring Samantha Figura, Marina Resa and Jesse Eisenberg.

== Cast ==
- Samantha Figura as Gina
- Marina Resa as Jennifer
- Jesse Eisenberg as Mark
- Trevor Zacharias as Stefan
- William P. Benz as Ian
- Dylan Kussman
- Dalton Leeb as Jeremy
- Marisa Petroro as Tatiana

== Reception ==
Robert Koehler of Variety gave the film a negative review and wrote that the film's "tendency to stuff too many notions and devices into less than 90 minutes — from Richard Kelly-ish everyday apocalypse to scenes of alien creatures on what may be Mars (judging from the production company moniker) — points to an imaginative, overactive and serious mind that has yet to find its voice."
