= The Mummy (2017 film) =

Film by Alex Kurtzman

- Theatrical release poster
- Directed by: Alex Kurtzman
- Screenplay by: David Koepp; Christopher McQuarrie; Dylan Kussman
- Story by: Jon Spaihts; Alex Kurtzman; Jenny Lumet
- Based on: The Mummy by: John L. Balderston; Nina Wilcox Putnam; Richard Schayer
- Produced by: Alex Kurtzman; Chris Morgan; Sean Daniel; Sarah Bradshaw
- Starring: Tom Cruise; Annabelle Wallis; Sofia Boutella; Jake Johnson; Courtney B. Vance; Marwan Kenzari; Russell Crowe
- Cinematography: Ben Seresin
- Edited by: Paul Hirsch; Gina Hirsch; Andrew Mondshein
- Music by: Brian Tyler
- Production companies: Dark Universe; Perfect World Pictures; Secret Hideout; Conspiracy Factory; Sean Daniel Company
- Distributed by: Universal Pictures
- Release date: June 9, 2017
- Running time: 110 minutes
- Country: United States
- Language: English
- Budget: $125–195 million
- Box office: $410 million

The Mummy is a 2017 American action-adventure film co-produced and directed by Alex Kurtzman from a screenplay written by David Koepp, Christopher McQuarrie, and Dylan Kussman based on a story by Kurtzman, Jon Spaihts, and Jenny Lumet. A reboot of the Mummy franchise, it stars Tom Cruise as U.S. Army Sergeant Nick Morton, a soldier of fortune who accidentally unearths the ancient tomb of entrapped Egyptian princess Ahmanet (Sofia Boutella). Annabelle Wallis, Jake Johnson, Courtney B. Vance, and Russell Crowe also star.

The Mummy premiered at the State Theatre in Sydney, Australia on May 22, 2017, and was theatrically released in the United States on June 9, 2017. It received generally negative reviews from critics and was a box-office bomb, grossing $410 million worldwide, losing $60–95 million due to high production and marketing costs. Intended to kick-start the Dark Universe, a shared universe based on the classic Universal Monsters film series, the film's poor reception led to the cancellation of the shared universe.

== Plot ==
In ancient Egypt, Princess Ahmanet is in line to rule over the pharaoh's kingdom, until the pharaoh sires a son. Knowing that her place to rule has been taken, she makes a deal with the deity Set and is given demonic powers through a ceremonial dagger. She murders her family and attempts to set the deity free, but is caught and mummified alive by Egyptian priests for her crimes. Her sarcophagus is then entombed in a region far away so she can never escape.

In present-day London, construction workers discover the tomb of a crusader knight who was buried with an Egyptian ruby, and Dr. Henry Jekyll takes over the operation. In Iraq, former U.S. Army Staff Sergeant Nick Morton and Corporal Chris Vail discover the tomb of Princess Ahmanet, unknowingly bringing Ahmanet back to life. British archaeologist, Jenny Halsey, and the soldiers fly with Ahmanet's sarcophagus to Britain.

During the flight, Chris is possessed by Ahmanet through a spider bite, and he attacks the others, only to be killed by Nick. A large flock of crows attacks the plane and is sucked into the engines. The plane crashes, killing the crew except for Jenny, who escapes with a parachute Nick gives her.

Nick returns to life in a morgue. Chris's ghost appears and tells him he has been cursed by Ahmanet, who seeks to use him as a vessel for Set. Ahmanet's mummy escapes from the sarcophagus and begins feeding on people to regenerate her body, turning them into zombies. She recovers the Dagger of Set and attempts to stab Nick before realizing that the ruby is not attached to it. She and her army chase after Nick and Jenny until soldiers appear and subdue her.

Jekyll explains that Jenny is an agent of Prodigium, a secret society dedicated to hunting supernatural threats. Nick and Jenny discover that Jekyll intends to allow Set to possess Nick's body completely, believing that this will render Set vulnerable. Jekyll transforms into Eddie Hyde. Nick stops him with a serum that Jekyll invented for this purpose, allowing Nick and Jenny to escape. Ahmanet finds them, regains the dagger, summons many crusader zombies, and creates a large sandstorm in London. The crusader zombies kill the Prodigium soldiers and scientists and Ahmanet recovers the ruby, combining it with the dagger in order to free Set.

Guided by Chris's ghost, Nick and Jenny flee into the London Underground, where Ahmanet's zombies attack them. Ahmanet captures Jenny and drowns her. When Nick is brought to Ahmanet, he sees Jenny's body, and the zombies turn to dust. Nick is injured when he tries to attack Ahmanet and lets her embrace him as a ruse to steal the dagger and shatter the ruby. He strikes the pommel of the dagger against the floor, cracking the ruby, but Ahmanet reminds him that the dagger could grant him the power to reverse death; instead, he stabs himself, and his body is possessed by Set. Set goes to Ahmanet as he begins to take over, but Nick looks at Jenny's dead body and remembers both her and Jekyll's words. Nick regains control and uses Set's powers to extract Ahmanet's life force, killing her, and Jenny is revived. Struggling against Set and knowing that Prodigium is coming for him, Nick says goodbye to Jenny and vanishes.

As Ahmanet is sealed back in her sarcophagus, Jenny and Jekyll wonder whether Nick, now fused with Set, will use his powers for good. Nick returns to the desert and resurrects Chris. The two go on an adventure, hoping to find a cure to remove the curse.

== Cast ==
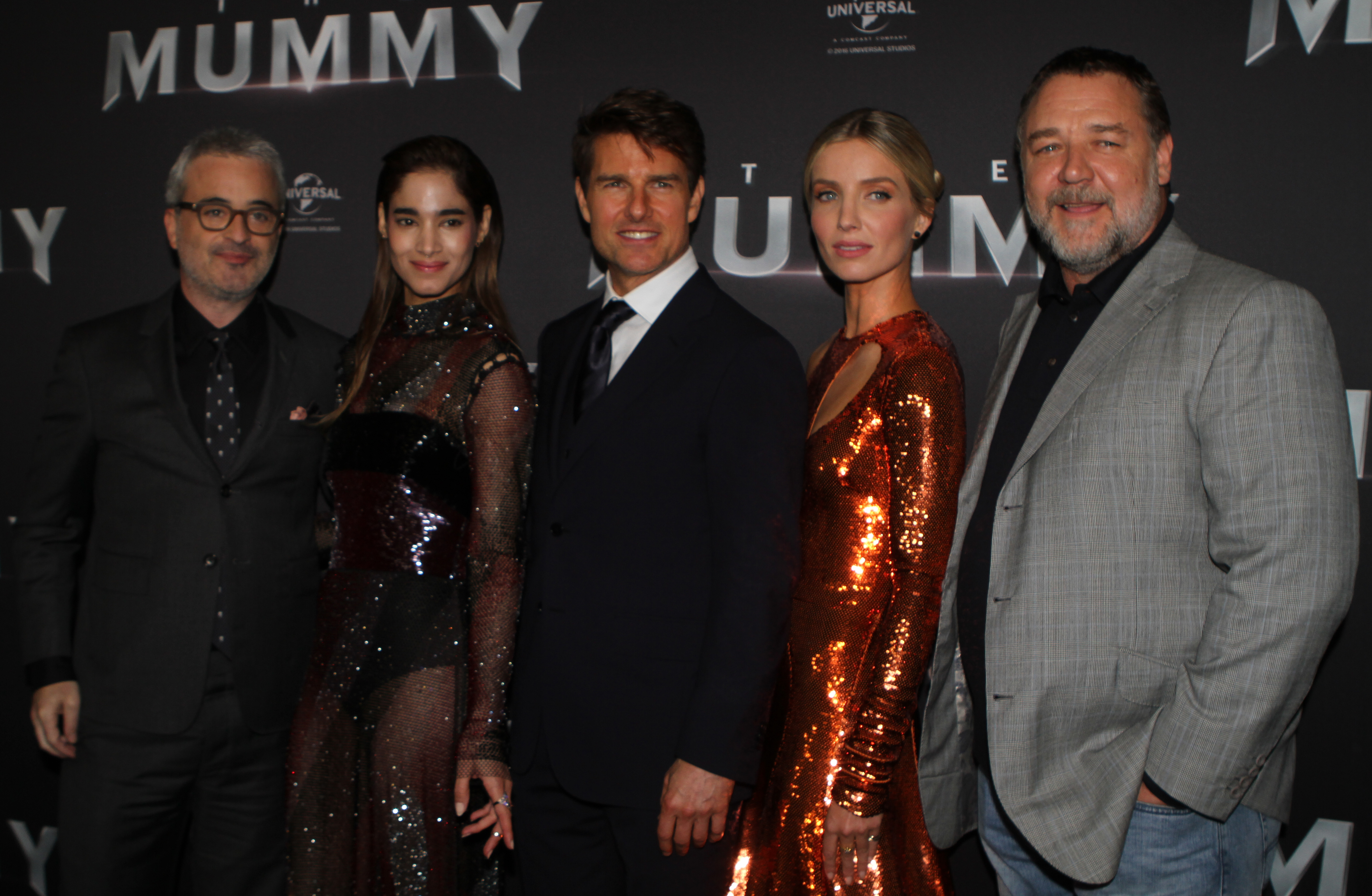
Director Alex Kurtzman with the film's main actors. Left to right: Sofia Boutella, Tom Cruise, Annabelle Wallis, and Russell Crowe.

- Tom Cruise as Nick Morton, a U.S. Army sergeant
- Annabelle Wallis as Jennifer "Jenny" Halsey, a British archaeologist
- Sofia Boutella as Ahmanet, the title character. She is loosely based on Imhotep from the original Mummy films, as well as the ancient Egyptian goddess Amunet
- Jake Johnson as Chris Vail, (Note: Jake Johnson's character is listed as Sgt. Vail in the closing credits, but is called Corporal Vail by Morton in the scene where they talk with Greenway.) Nick's friend and closest ally
- Courtney B. Vance as Colonel Greenway, Nick and Chris's superior officer
- Russell Crowe as Dr. Henry Jekyll / Edward "Eddie" Hyde
- Marwan Kenzari as Malik, Jekyll's chief of security and a member of Prodigium
- Javier Botet as Set, the ancient Egyptian god of death

== Production ==
=== Development ===
==== The Mummy 4 and reboot attempts ====
Ahead of the summer release of The Mummy: Tomb of the Dragon Emperor, Maria Bello was hopeful that a fourth entry in the series would be made. Series newcomer Luke Ford was signed on for three films. The film, entitled The Mummy: Rise of the Aztecs, was to be set in South America and would have seen Antonio Banderas portray the villain. Rob Cohen was interested in directing a future installment while Brendan Fraser and John Hannah were supposedly on board. Plans for the fourth film came to halt in April 2012 when Universal Pictures opted to reboot the series.

Jon Spaihts, known for his work on the Alien prequel Prometheus, was writing the film, while Sean Daniel would act as producer. Spaihts hoped to take the franchise back to its horror roots and "simultaneously open it up to an epic scale we haven't seen before". Alex Kurtzman and Roberto Orci became involved with the project shortly thereafter; signing a two-year deal with the studio to produce The Mummy as well as a "reimagining" of Van Helsing. Len Wiseman was selected to direct the film in September 2012 due to his work on Underworld. Wiseman aimed for a contemporary setting and to make something "entirely different" than the Fraser-led films, while Kurtzman indicated that while The Mummy would still fall into the "four-quadrant audience zone", the film would have a darker tone. The works of Michael Crichton were also cited as an influence on the reboot. Universal anticipated a 2014 release. The studio was keen on having production underway in 2013. State of Play screenwriter Billy Ray was contracted to pen a competing draft as a contingency plan should Spaihts' draft fail to satisfy. Universal also prepared to combine the "best of" both scripts if neither were up to par. Wiseman would fall off the project in July 2013 in order to focus on Sleepy Hollow. Despite the setback, the project was still a high priority for Universal and was still moving "full-speed ahead".

The studio quickly began searching for a replacement the following month, with Andy Muschietti emerging as the front-runner in September. Spaihts remained attached while an April 2016 release date was slotted in November. Spaihts would later be joined by Kurtzman and Orci for subsequent drafts. But Muschietti's involvement would not last much longer, with the Mama filmmaker exiting the project in May 2014. Muschietti intended to follow the previously established darker tone, but a newer family friendly action adventure-approach was favored by the producers, leading to his departure.

==== Kurtzman and Dark Universe ====
In April 2014, Orci would depart from his producing duties in order to focus on directing the third Star Trek film, while Kurtzman would continue developing The Mummy. Universal then paired Kurtzman with Chris Morgan, credited for "rebooting" the Fast & Furious franchise, to oversee a new shared universe featuring the Universal Monsters. Days later, Kurtzman was in final talks to helm the film. A new release date of June 24, 2016, was given at month's end. Jenny Lumet of Rachel Getting Married was brought in for further rewrites. Lumet chose to turn the titular character from a man to a woman without notifying the studio beforehand. The writer strove to humanize the antagonist and not have them be "evil for the sake of evil" or "not pining away for some lost love". Another delay resulted in the film being pushed to March 24, 2017.

=== Pre-production ===
Tom Cruise began talks about playing the lead in November 2015. Cruise, who was paid between $11–13 million for his involvement, was expected to hold a degree of power during development. Filming was gearing up to begin in February 2016. Sofia Boutella entered negotiations that December to portray the title character. Kurtzman cast Boutella after seeing and being impressed by her largely mute performance in Kingsman: The Secret Service. Kurtzman noted that "if you look at her eyes, and this is what I got from watching Kingsman, there's a whole performance going on here. And in not saying anything but conveying that much to me, I thought oh my god, no matter how much prosthetics we put on her, no matter how much CG we put on her face, if I see this, she's going to convey something very emotional to me." A final delay occurred in January 2016, dating the film for June 9, 2017. Throughout March and April, Annabelle Wallis was cast as a co-lead, while Jake Johnson, Marwan Kenzari, and Courtney B. Vance were cast in supporting roles. Tom Hardy was the first actor courted to play Dr. Jekyll and Mr. Hyde, but talks fell apart. The studio would turn to Javier Bardem, but no deal would be reached. Russell Crowe was cast in the role in May 2016. The studio hoped for a potential spin-off film for the character. Javier Botet was cast in June as Set.

=== Filming ===
Principal photography on the film began on April 3, 2016, in Oxford, United Kingdom. Pinewood Studios and Shepperton Studios were also used for production, with underwater scenes shot at Pinewood. Filming on the movie concluded on July 17, 2016, in London. Production then moved to Namibia for two weeks, with principal photography wrapping up on August 13, 2016.

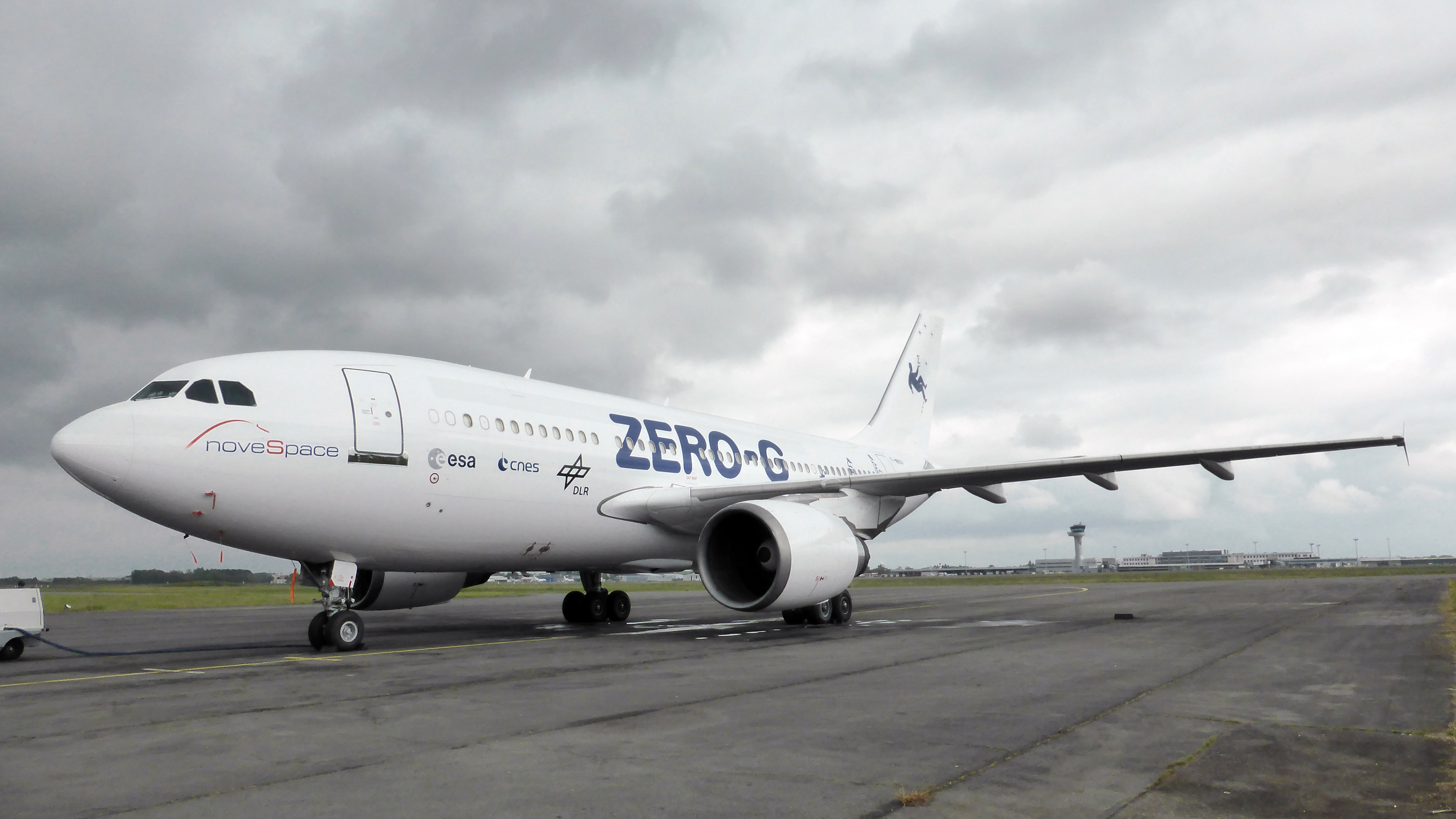
The Airbus A310 used at the scene of the plane crash parked at the Bordeaux-Mérignac airport.

For the filming of the plane crash the production made use of The Vomit Comet and parabolic flight to simulate the illusion of weightlessness. The crew did a total of 64 takes with many of the crew becoming sick to their stomachs. Initially Kurtzman planned to shoot the scene entirely using wires and a rotating set; however, Cruise's insistence changed his mind.

During production, Cruise wielded "nearly complete creative oversight" on the film. Cruise was said to have felt like the "real director" of The Mummy by handling the action sequences and "micro-managing" the overall project when Kurtzman struggled to handle the scope of the film. Christopher McQuarrie and Dylan Kussman were enlisted, along with one or two other writers, to help transform the screenplay into a full-fledged Tom Cruise-vehicle; subsiding Boutella's role whilst bringing Cruise to the forefront. The new writers also implemented a plot point which involved the protagonist becoming possessed. Universal was reportedly unimpressed, but continued to let Cruise rework the film. McQuarrie, Kussman, and David Koepp, who was writing the Bride of Frankenstein reboot at the time, were awarded screenplay credit, while story credit was attributed to Spaihts, Kurtzman, and Lumet. On set, crew members were allegedly split between whether they believed Cruise's direction was over-excessive or if he was improving a film "troubled from its inception". Universal denied that the actor's influence negatively impacted the film, saying "Tom approaches every project with a level of commitment and dedication that is unmatched by most working in our business today. He has been a true partner and creative collaborator, and his goal with any project he works on is to provide audiences with a truly cinematic moviegoing experience." Kurtzman would later reflect that, "The Mummy wasn't what I wanted it to be", describing the experience of working on the film as "painful."

=== Post-production ===
Erik Nash was the film's visual effects supervisor. MPC was the top contractor, with over 1,000 effects plates. Industrial Light & Magic and DNEG also contributed to key sequences.

=== Music ===
Composer Brian Tyler started work on the music for the movie early, writing about a half hour of music before filming even began. Working on the film for a year and half, Tyler recorded with an 84-piece orchestra and 32-voice choir at London's Abbey Road. He ultimately wrote and recorded over two hours of music, which, given the length of the film (110 minutes), resulted in a soundtrack album longer than the film itself.

== Release ==
Initially scheduled for a 2016 release, the film was released in the United States and Canada on June 9, 2017, with international roll out beginning the same day.

On December 20, 2016, IMAX released a trailer with the wrong audio track attached; this unintentionally prompted the creation of memes and video montages featuring the mistakenly included audio track, which was missing most of the sound effects and instead featured Tom Cruise's grunts and screams. IMAX reacted by taking down the trailer and issuing DMCA takedown notices in an attempt to stop it from spreading.

=== Home media ===
The Mummy was released on Digital HD on August 22, 2017, and on DVD, Blu-ray and Ultra HD Blu-ray on September 12, 2017.

== Reception ==
=== Box office ===
The Mummy grossed $80.2 million in the United States and Canada and $329.8 million in other territories for a worldwide total of $410 million. Due to a combined production and marketing cost of $345 million, it was estimated the film needed to gross $450 million in order to break-even, and ended up losing the studio between $60–95 million.

In North America, the film was released alongside It Comes at Night and Megan Leavey and was originally projected to gross $35–40 million from 4,034 theaters in its opening weekend. However, after making $12 million on its first day (including $2.66 million from Thursday night previews), weekend projections were lowered to $30 million. It ended up debuting to $31.7 million, marking the lowest of the Mummy franchise and finishing second at the box office behind Wonder Woman ($58.2 million in its second week). Deadline Hollywood attributed the film's underperformance to poor critic and audience reactions, as well as "blockbuster fatigue". In its second weekend the film made $14.5 million (dropping 54.2%), finishing 4th at the box office. It was pulled from 827 theaters in its third week and made $5.8 million, dropping another 60% and finishing 6th at the box office.

The film did better overseas. Outside North America, the film opened in 63 overseas territories, with China, the UK, Mexico, Germany, Ireland, Australia, New Zealand, Brazil and Russia receiving the film the same day as in North America, and was projected to debut to $125–135 million. It opened on June 6, 2017, in South Korea and grossed $6.6 million on its first day, the biggest-ever debut for both Tom Cruise and Universal in the country. It ended up having a foreign debut of $140.7 million, the biggest of Cruise's career. In its opening weekend the film made $52.4 million in China, $7.4 million in Russia, $4.9 million in Mexico and $4.2 million in the United Kingdom.

=== Critical response ===
The Mummy received negative reviews from critics, with criticism aimed at its narrative tone and plot points setting up the Dark Universe. On Rotten Tomatoes, the film holds an approval rating of 15% based on 314 reviews, with an average rating of 4.2/10. The website's critical consensus reads, "Lacking the campy fun of the franchise's most recent entries and failing to deliver many monster-movie thrills, The Mummy suggests a speedy unraveling for the Dark Universe." On Metacritic, the film has a weighted average score of 34 out of 100, based on 44 critics, indicating "generally unfavorable reviews". Audiences polled by CinemaScore gave the film an average grade of "B−" on an A+ to F scale, while PostTrak reported filmgoers gave it a 70% overall positive score.

Vince Mancini of Uproxx gave the film a negative review, writing: "If you like incomprehensible collections of things that vaguely resemble other things you might've enjoyed in the past, The Mummy is the movie for you." IndieWire's David Ehrlich gave the film a D−, calling it the worst film of Cruise's career and criticizing its lack of originality, saying: "It's one thing to excavate the iconography of old Hollywood, it's another to exploit it. This isn't filmmaking, it's tomb-raiding."

Owen Gleiberman of Variety wrote: "The problem at its heart is that the reality of what the movie is—a Tom Cruise vehicle—is at war with the material. The actor, at 54, is still playing that old Cruise trope, the selfish cocky semi-scoundrel who has to grow up. ... The trouble is that Cruise, at least in a high-powered potboiler like this one, is so devoted to maintaining his image as a clear and wholesome hero that his flirtation with the dark side is almost entirely theoretical." Writing for Rolling Stone, Peter Travers gave the film one star out of four, saying: "How meh is The Mummy? Let me count the ways. For all the huffing and puffing and digital desperation from overworked computers, this reboot lands onscreen with a resounding thud."

Glen Kenny of RogerEbert.com gave the film 1.5/4 stars, writing: "I found something almost admirable about the film's cheek. It's [so] amazingly relentless in its naked borrowing from other, better horror and sci-fi movies that I was able to keep occupied making a checklist of the movies referenced." Entertainment Weekly's Chris Nashawaty wrote that the film "feels derivative and unnecessary and like it was written by committee."

In BBC World News Culture, Nicholas Barber calls the film "a mish-mash of wildly varying tones and plot strands, from its convoluted beginning to its shameless non-end. Tom Cruise's new film barely qualifies as a film at all. None of it makes sense. The film delivers all the chases, explosions, zombies and ghosts you could ask for, and there are a few amusing lines and creepy moments, but, between the headache-inducing flashbacks and hallucinations, the narrative would be easier to follow if it were written in hieroglyphics."

Peter Bradshaw of The Guardian wrote that the film "has some nice moments but is basically a mess. The plot sags like an aeon-old decaying limb, a jumble of ideas and scenes from what look like different screenplay drafts," and concluded that "It's a ragbag of action scenes which needed to be bandaged more tightly." Empire film magazine was more positive, with Dan Jolin awarding the film three stars. "It's running and jumping grin-flashing business as usual for Cruise, once more on safe character territory as an Ethan Hunt-esque action protagonist who couples up with a much younger woman, while another woman chases after him," he wrote. "And if the next installment-teasing conclusion is anything to go by, Cruise seemed to have enough fun making this that he may just return for more."

In 2022, director Alex Kurtzman commented that the film is "probably the biggest failure of [his] life" and that there's "about a million things I regret about it". However, he noted that the job gave him more experience and knowledge as a filmmaker. Brendan Fraser, who starred in the previous Mummy films, stated that, in his view, the film failed due to a lack of "fun. That was what was lacking in that incarnation. It was too much of a straight-ahead horror movie. The Mummy should be a thrill ride, but not terrifying and scary. I know how difficult it is to pull it off. I tried to do it three times." In 2024, Stephen Sommers, who directed the first two installments of the Brendan Fraser-led series, said that he "was kind of insulted" that no one contacted him about the reboot. "They never contacted me or called me. I was doing other things, and it's not like I sat crying. I just think it's common courtesy."

=== Accolades ===
| Year | Award | Category | Subject | Result | Ref. |
|---|---|---|---|---|---|
| 2018 | Golden Raspberry Awards | Worst Picture | Sarah Bradshaw, Sean Daniel, Alex Kurtzman, Chris Morgan | Nominated | |
| 2018 | Golden Raspberry Awards | Worst Director | Alex Kurtzman | Nominated | |
| 2018 | Golden Raspberry Awards | Worst Actor | Tom Cruise | Won | |
| 2018 | Golden Raspberry Awards | Worst Supporting Actor | Russell Crowe | Nominated | |
| 2018 | Golden Raspberry Awards | Worst Supporting Actress | Sofia Boutella | Nominated | |
| 2018 | Golden Raspberry Awards | Worst Screenplay | David Koepp, Christopher McQuarrie, Dylan Kussman | Nominated | |
| 2018 | Golden Raspberry Awards | Worst Prequel, Remake, Rip-off or Sequel | The Mummy | Nominated | |
| 2018 | Golden Raspberry Awards | The Razzie Nominee So Rotten You Loved It | The Mummy | Nominated | |

== Other media ==
Two video games based on the film, The Mummy Demastered and The Mummy: Dark Universe Stories, were released on October 24, 2017. The former is a Metroidvania featuring a stand-alone story, which takes place concurrently with the events of the film and follows Prodigium soldiers under the command of Dr. Jekyll who fight the forces of Princess Ahmanet, while the latter is a choose-your-own-adventure game set after the events of the film, establishing the original Universal Monsters films as existing in its canon; unlike the film, both video games received positive reviews. A manga series set concurrently with the film, The Mummy: Dark Stories, was released by GANMA! from July 15 to 29, 2017.

== Cancelled franchise ==
The film was part of Universal Pictures' "Dark Universe", an attempt to create a modern cinematic universe based on the classic Universal Monsters film series. A remake of Bride of Frankenstein, with Angelina Jolie attached for the lead, was originally scheduled for release on February 14, 2019, but on October 5, 2017, Universal decided to postpone it indefinitely. The 2014 film Dracula Untold was originally retrospectively considered to be the first film in the series; however, since the film's release, the connection to the Dark Universe was purposefully downplayed, and The Mummy was then repositioned as the first film in the series. On May 22, 2017, the official Dark Universe Twitter account posted an image with Tom Cruise, Sofia Boutella, Johnny Depp (attached to star in a new film version of The Invisible Man), Javier Bardem (who had signed on to play Frankenstein's monster) and Russell Crowe standing together. By late 2017 Kurtzman and Morgan were reported to have walked away from their roles as the franchise's creative leads. Kurtzman later confirmed in a 2019 interview that "I'm no longer involved in [the franchise] and have no idea what's going on with it." By 2019, Universal had returned to stand-alone features instead of using a shared film narrative, effectively ending the Dark Universe.

== See also ==
- Development hell
