= Jesse Eisenberg =

American actor, playwright, and filmmaker (born 1983)

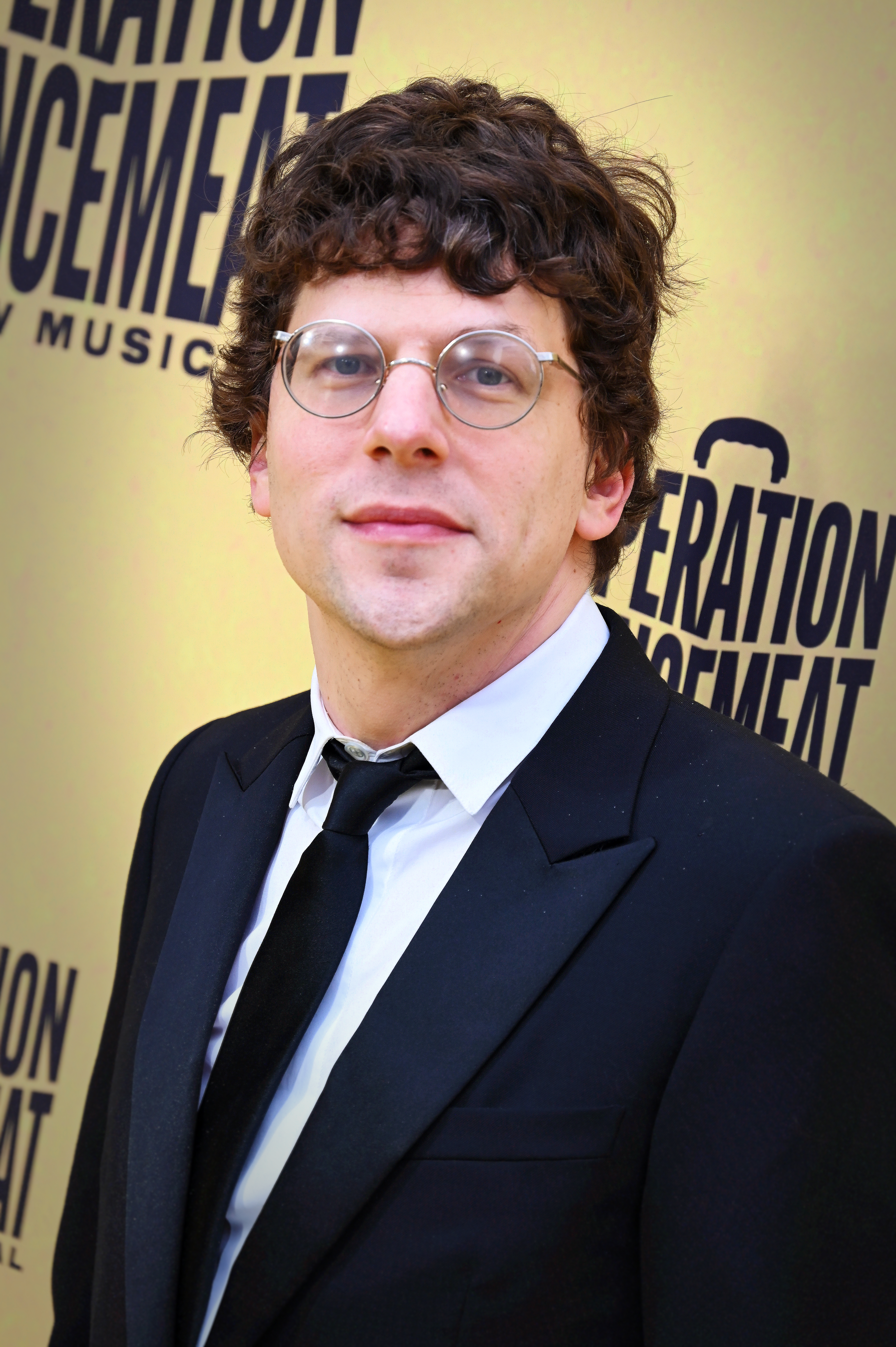
- Eisenberg in 2025
- Born: Jesse Adam Eisenberg; October 5, 1983 (age 43); New York City, U.S.
- Citizenship: United States; Poland (since 2025)
- Occupations: Actor; playwright; film director; screenwriter; producer
- Years active: 1996–present
- Works: Full list
- Spouse: Anna Strout (m. 2017)
- Children: 1
- Relatives: Hallie Eisenberg (sister)
- Awards: Full list

Jesse Adam Eisenberg (/ˈaɪzənbɜːrɡ/ EYE-zən-burg; born October 5, 1983) is a Polish-American actor, playwright, and filmmaker. Recognized for playing smart but socially awkward characters in both comedies and dramas, his accolades include a BAFTA Award as well as nominations for two Academy Awards, and three Golden Globes.

Eisenberg made his television debut with the short-lived comedy-drama series Get Real (1999–2000). Following his first leading role in the film Roger Dodger (2002), he starred in films such as The Squid and the Whale (2005), Adventureland (2009) and Zombieland (2009). He gained wider recognition for starring as Facebook founder Mark Zuckerberg in David Fincher's film The Social Network (2010), for which he was nominated for the Academy Award for Best Actor. Eisenberg then starred in the Woody Allen films To Rome with Love (2012) and Café Society (2016), the heist films Now You See Me (2013) and its two sequels (2016 and 2025), and independent dramas such as The Double (2013).

He starred as Lex Luthor in the DC Extended Universe (DCEU) superhero films Batman v Superman: Dawn of Justice (2016) and Zack Snyder's Justice League (2021), and had a lead voice role as Blu in the animated films Rio (2011) and Rio 2 (2014). In 2022, he starred in the FX / Hulu miniseries Fleishman Is in Trouble and made his film directorial debut with the black comedy When You Finish Saving the World. He has since directed, written, and starred in the comedy-drama A Real Pain (2024), which earned him the BAFTA Award for Best Original Screenplay and an Academy Award nomination in the same category.

Jesse Eisenberg has contributed pieces to The New Yorker and the website McSweeney's. He has written and starred in three plays for the New York stage: Asuncion, The Revisionist, and The Spoils. He released his first book, Bream Gives Me Hiccups: and Other Stories, in 2015.

== Early life ==
"... It taught me ... about the discipline about performance ... Every morning she had a duck party, she would wake up very early and tune her guitar and warm up her voice, and it taught me that you could take performance seriously. I think a lot of actors have trouble taking things seriously, ... but it's really like anything else in the world ... So it gave me the confidence to take it seriously and not make me feel silly for indulging in a role."

— Eisenberg, on the influence his mother's previous job as a children's clown had on his acting

Jesse Adam Eisenberg was born in Astoria, Queens (NYC) and grew up in East Brunswick, New Jersey. His mother, Amy (née Fishman), who now teaches cross-cultural sensitivity in hospitals, previously worked as a clown named Bonabini at children's parties and as a director/choreographer for a high school for 20 years. She was also a Socialist Zionist and member of the Hashomer Hatzair youth organization. His father, Barry Eisenberg, drove a taxicab, then worked at a hospital, and later became a college professor, teaching sociology. He has two sisters: Hallie Eisenberg, a former child actress who was once famous as the "Pepsi Girl" in a series of commercials; and Kerri Eisenberg, now Kerry Lea, who also worked as an actress, ran a vegetarianism- and animal rights-based children's theatre troupe, later becoming an independent artist in New York.

Eisenberg was raised in a secular Jewish household. His ancestors came from Poland and from the area that later became Ukraine. He attended the East Brunswick Public Schools at Frost Elementary School, Hammarskjold Middle School (6th & 7th), Churchill Junior High School (8th & 9th), and spent his sophomore and junior years at East Brunswick High School. He then transferred to the Professional Performing Arts School in New York for his senior year. When he was a senior, he received his breakthrough role in the independent comedy-drama film Roger Dodger. His work in the film prevented him from enrolling at New York University. Instead, he studied anthropology and contemporary architecture at The New School in Greenwich Village, where he majored in liberal arts, with a focus on democracy and cultural pluralism.

== Career ==
=== Beginnings ===
Eisenberg struggled to fit in at school due to an anxiety disorder, and began acting in plays at an early age. When he was seven he starred as Oliver Twist in a children's theater production of the musical Oliver!, and by 12 he was an understudy in the 1996 Broadway revival of Tennessee Williams' Summer and Smoke. At 13, he understudied the role of Young Scrooge in a musical version of A Christmas Carol starring Tony Randall. He had his first professional role in Arje Shaw's off-Broadway play The Gathering at age 16. He said, "When playing a role, I would feel more comfortable, as you're given a prescribed way of behaving."

Eisenberg started writing screenplays at 16, some of which were optioned by major studios, but he claimed that he was dissatisfied with the lack of control he had over his creations once they were sold. He once got into trouble with Woody Allen's lawyers when, as a teenager, he penned a play about how Allen came to change his name and managed to get the script to Allen's "people." Instead of a seal of approval, he received cease and desist letters from Allen's attorney. Eisenberg later starred in two films directed by Allen, To Rome with Love and Café Society.

=== 1999–2008: Early work ===
Eisenberg made his television debut in the series Get Real, from 1999 to 2000. In 2001, he appeared in a UK Dr Pepper commercial as "Butt Naked Boy." After appearing in the made-for-television film Lightning: Fire from the Sky at 18, he starred in the independent film Roger Dodger (for which he won an award at the San Diego Film Festival for Most Promising New Actor), and in The Emperor's Club, both of which were released in 2002 to generally positive reviews. Eisenberg was sick for the majority of the nightclub scene and can be seen sweating in different shots.

In 2005, Eisenberg appeared in Cursed, a horror film directed by Wes Craven, and The Squid and the Whale, a well-reviewed independent drama starring Laura Linney and Jeff Daniels. In 2007, he starred opposite Richard Gere and Terrence Howard in The Hunting Party, a comic thriller in which he plays an American journalist reporting from Bosnia and was also cast in the indie comic-drama Holy Rollers alongside his sister, Hallie Eisenberg, who played his fictional sister in the film. He played a young Hasidic Jew who becomes involved in the ecstasy smuggling trade, using his religion as a disguise to deal without suspicion. Filming took place in New York in 2008. In 2009, Eisenberg played the lead role alongside Kristen Stewart which would be the first of many collaborations between them in Adventureland, a comedy directed by Greg Mottola and filmed in Kennywood Park, near Pittsburgh, Pennsylvania. Filming wrapped in October 2007, and the film had its premiere at the Sundance Film Festival in 2009. During the late 2000s, he also had roles in the independent films Solitary Man, playing college student Daniel, and Camp Hell, a horror film directed by George Van Buskirk.

=== 2009–2011: Breakthrough and critical success ===
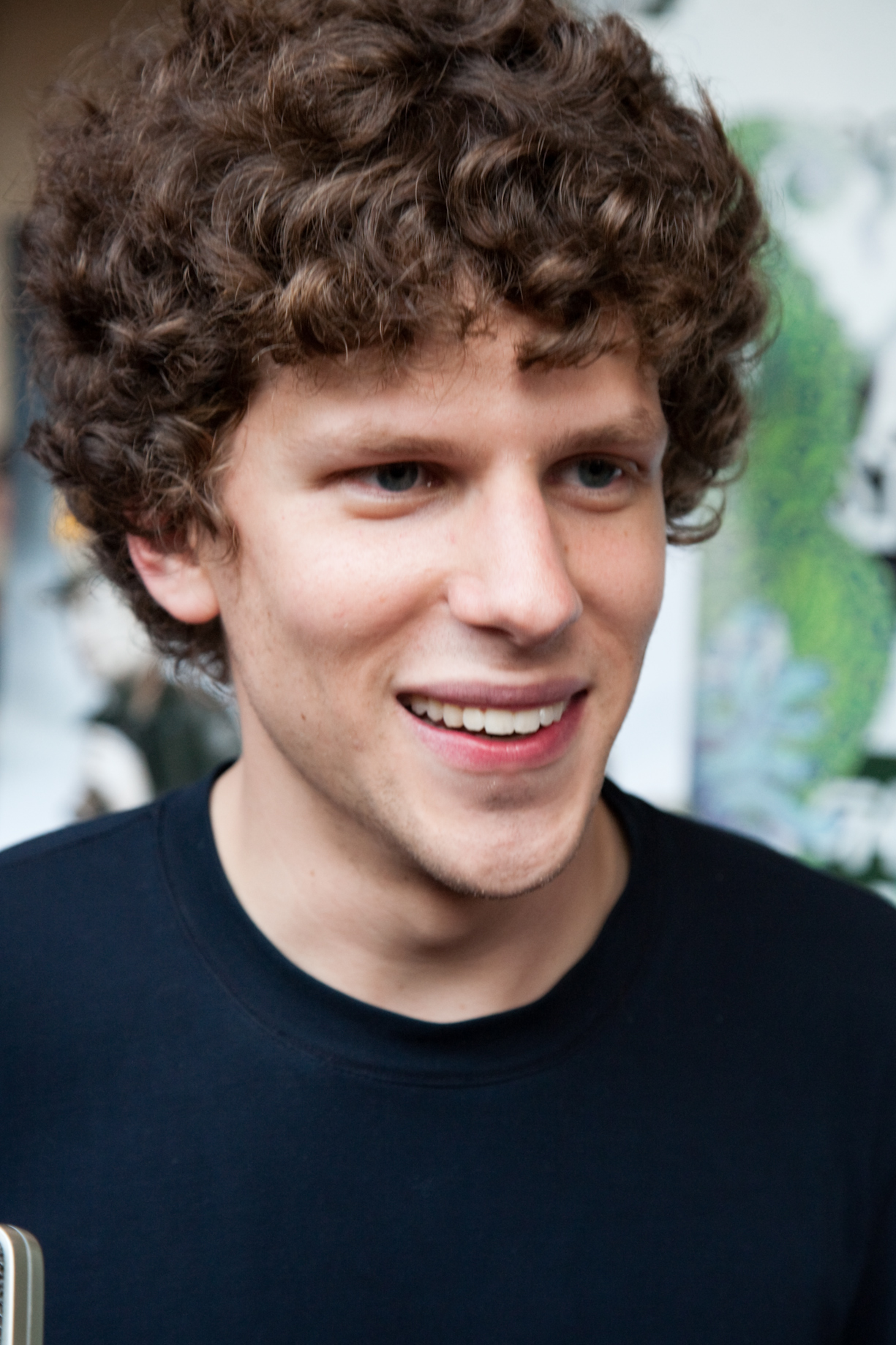
Jesse Eisenberg at the premiere of Zombieland in September 2009

Jesse Eisenberg's first major box office success was a lead role in the horror-comedy Zombieland (2009). He starred opposite Woody Harrelson, Emma Stone, and Abigail Breslin as a group of survivors on a road trip through a post-zombie apocalypse America, and was a sleeper hit. In 2010, he portrayed Facebook creator Mark Zuckerberg in the film The Social Network, for which he earned the Best Actor Award from the National Board of Review of Motion Pictures, and nominations for Best Actor at the BAFTA Awards, Golden Globes, and Academy Awards but lost to Colin Firth for his performance of George VI in The King's Speech. According to the film's director, David Fincher, both he and screenwriter Aaron Sorkin knew Eisenberg was the one for the role as soon as they watched his audition tape, despite Eisenberg's own anxieties about his audition.

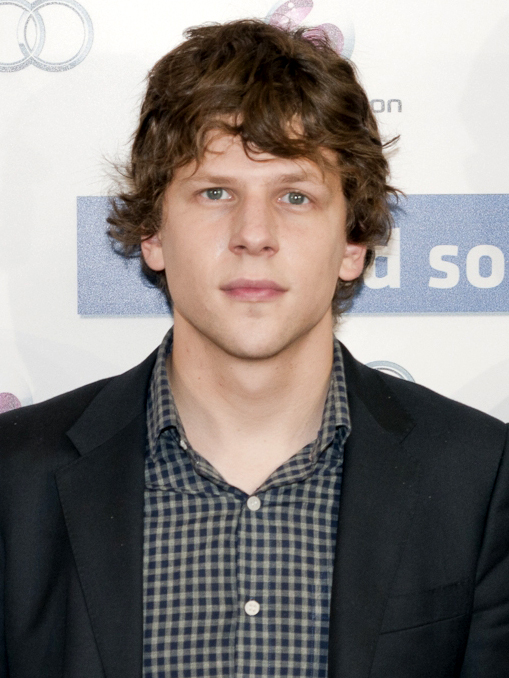
Jesse Eisenberg at the Madrid premiere of The Social Network in October 2010

On January 29, 2011, Eisenberg hosted Saturday Night Live on NBC, with musical guest Nicki Minaj. During his opening monologue, Zuckerberg himself appeared. Eisenberg said that meeting the man he portrayed on-screen was "an overwhelming experience," and was happy that "we were both able to have fun at the situation." Zuckerberg, who has complained frequently about the artistic licenses taken by The Social Network, would later say that he thought Eisenberg "was a little afraid to meet me after his portrayal, but I tried to be nice."

In 2011, he starred in the box-office animated hit Rio, as the main character Blu, a metropolitan domesticated male Spix's macaw who learns how to fly. He starred alongside Anne Hathaway, his former co-star (and onscreen sibling) from Get Real, as well as George Lopez, Tracy Morgan, will.i.am, and Jamie Foxx. He featured in one song, "Real in Rio," in the film's soundtrack, which was nominated for an Academy Award for Best Original Song. He also starred alongside Aziz Ansari, Danny McBride, and Nick Swardson in 30 Minutes or Less, a film noir heist-comedy about a pizza delivery man, played by Eisenberg, who is forced to rob a bank, which was released in August 2011. In October 2011, Eisenberg made his playwriting debut in Rattlestick Playwrights Theater's Off-Broadway production of Asuncion, staged at Cherry Lane Theatre. Jesse Eisenberg also acted in the play, which was directed by Kip Fagan. The play highlights two overeducated, liberal-minded friends, played by Jesse Eisenberg and Justin Bartha, whose assumptions are challenged by their new Filipina roommate, played by Camille Mana.

=== 2012–2019: Work as a playwright and acting roles ===
In 2012, he starred alongside Melissa Leo in Why Stop Now, a drama about a drug addict mother (Leo) and her piano prodigy son (Eisenberg), and in the magical realist romantic comedy To Rome with Love, directed by Woody Allen. That same year, he filed a $3 million lawsuit against the producers of the 2010 direct-to-DVD film Camp Hell, claiming exploitation. According to the lawsuit, Eisenberg agreed to appear in the film as a favor to his friends. He was on set for one day of filming in 2007, earned about $3,000, and logged only a few minutes of total screen time. Because of his minimal involvement in the production, he was surprised to see that his face was prominently featured on the cover of the DVD, implying that he starred in the film. His lawsuit asserts various California law causes of action, including claims for unfair business practices and publicity rights.

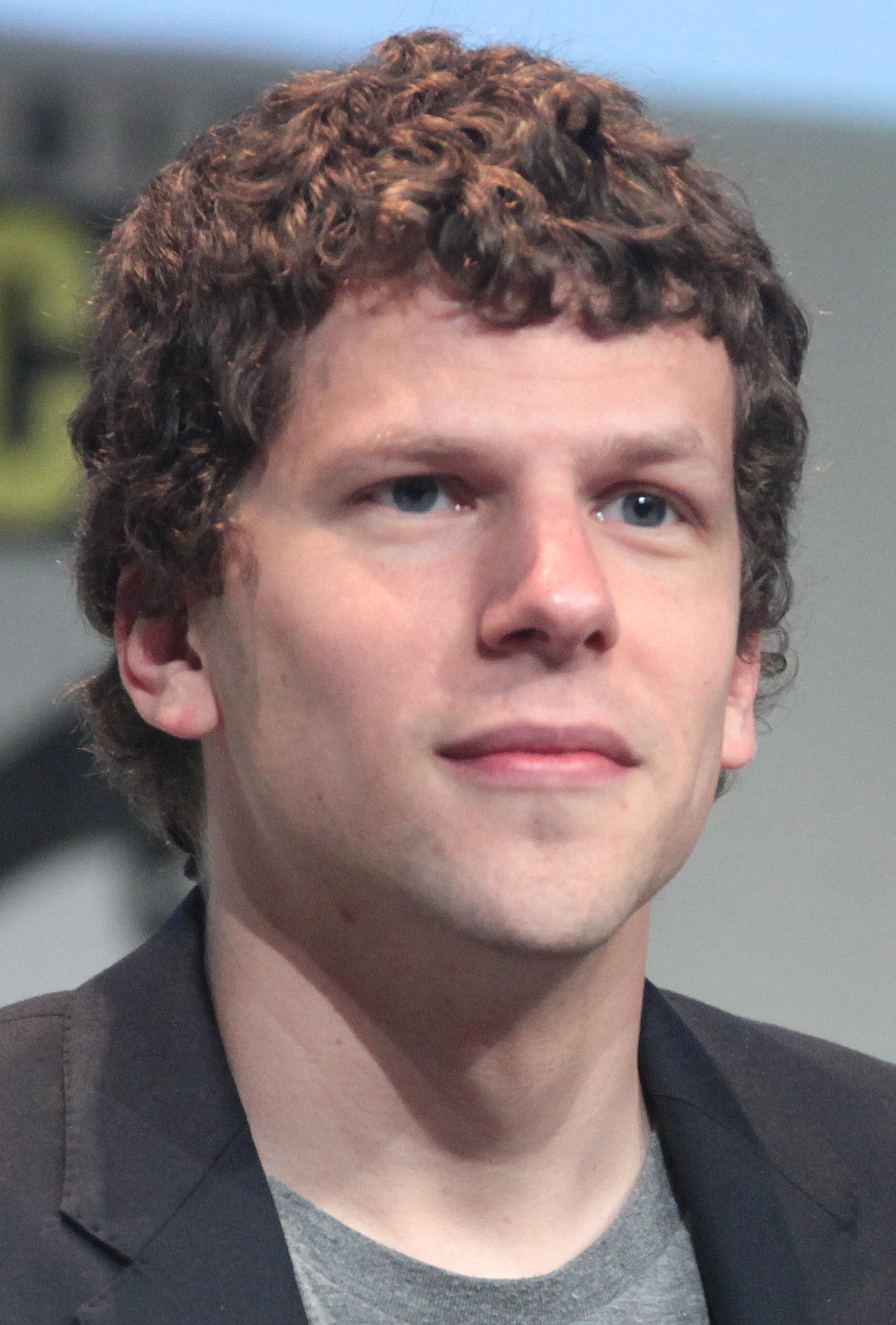
Eisenberg at the 2015 San Diego Comic-Con

In 2013, Eisenberg reunited with Woody Harrelson for the magician heist thriller Now You See Me, playing a world-famous close-up magician and street performer recruited into a secret group of elite magicians to pull off bank heists with magic tricks, redistributing the money from a wealthy businessman (Michael Caine) to victims of his corrupt capitalist schemes. That year he announced his plan to continue writing, for both stage and screen, as well as continuing to act. He debuted his second play, The Revisionist, and starred in Richard Ayoade's drama, The Double (2013), which was shot in 2012. In the following years, Eisenberg reprised his role as Blu in Rio 2 (2014), and reunited with Stewart in the action comedy American Ultra (2015), playing a rogue sleeper agent being chased by the C.I.A.

In 2015, Eisenberg portrayed Rolling Stone journalist David Lipsky in the biographical drama film The End of the Tour, appearing opposite Jason Segel, who portrayed the late author David Foster Wallace. Eisenberg's third play, The Spoils, premiered off-Broadway in The New Group Perishing Square Signature Center Alice Griffin Box Theatre. The play featuring Eisenberg as Ben, also starring Kunal Nayyar, Michael Zegen, Erin Darke, and Annapurna Sriram, was the winner of The Blanche and Irving Laurie Foundation Theatre Visions Fund Award. On September 8, 2015, Eisenberg released his first book, Bream Gives Me Hiccups, a collection of short humor pieces.

Eisenberg serves on the Board of Advisors for Playing On Air, a public radio show/podcast that works with contemporary playwrights to produce plays for "today's digital audience." He has written one short play for Playing On Air, called A Little Part of All of Us (2015), which he starred in with Justin Bartha. He has voiced for two other plays, The Final Interrogation of Ceaucescu's Dog (2015), written by Warren Leight, and The Blizzard (2016), written by David Ives and directed by John Rando. Eisenberg played the supervillain Lex Luthor in Batman v Superman: Dawn of Justice, which was released in March 2016, to generally negative reviews. His performance in particular was criticized by comic book fans and film reviewers, later earning him the Golden Raspberry Award for Worst Supporting Actor. He defended himself by saying he attempted to "make these people real and relatable and interesting and engaging." Years later, Eisenberg shared that he felt joining the project was detrimental to his career because he was poorly received in the high-profile film.

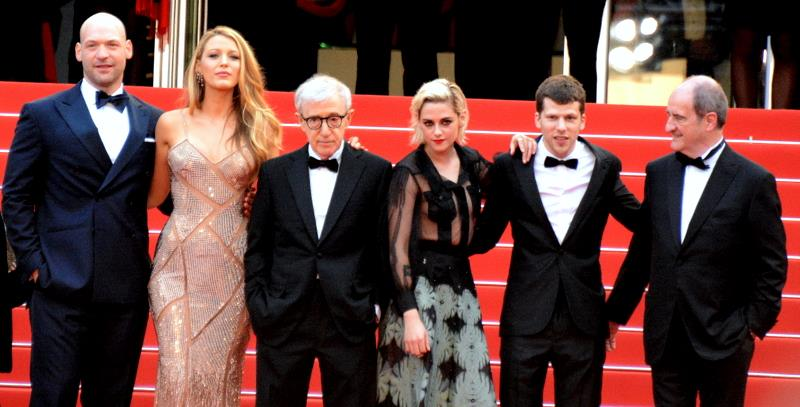
Jesse Eisenberg with the cast of Café Society at the 2016 Cannes Film Festival

Jesse Eisenberg then reunited with Woody Allen and Kristen Stewart (for the third time) in Café Society. The film held its world premiere at the Cannes Film Festival on May 11, 2016. Eisenberg next reprised his role as street magician J. Daniel "Danny" Atlas in Now You See Me 2, which was released on June 10, 2016, previewed June 9, to mixed reviews. The film was shot primarily in London and Macau. It grossed over $267 million worldwide, and Lionsgate CEO Jon Feltheimer announced that they had "already begun early planning" for Now You See Me 3. On June 2, 2016, Eisenberg's play The Spoils began a run at London's Trafalgar Studios in the West End, with Scott Elliott returning to direct. Eisenberg again played the lead role, along with Nayyar and Sriram, while Zegen and Darke's characters were replaced by Alfie Allen and Katie Brayben respectively. In May 2016, Eisenberg teased that he would reprise his role of Lex Luthor in the Justice League film (2017). An official press kit, released by Warner Bros. on December 22, 2016, confirmed the return. He appeared as Luthor in the post-credits scene alongside Joe Manganiello as Slade Wilson/Deathstroke. Eisenberg joined Riley Stearns's dark comedy The Art of Self-Defense alongside Imogen Poots and Alessandro Nivola. Principal photography began in Louisville, Kentucky, on September 11, 2017 and the film had its world premiere in 2019.

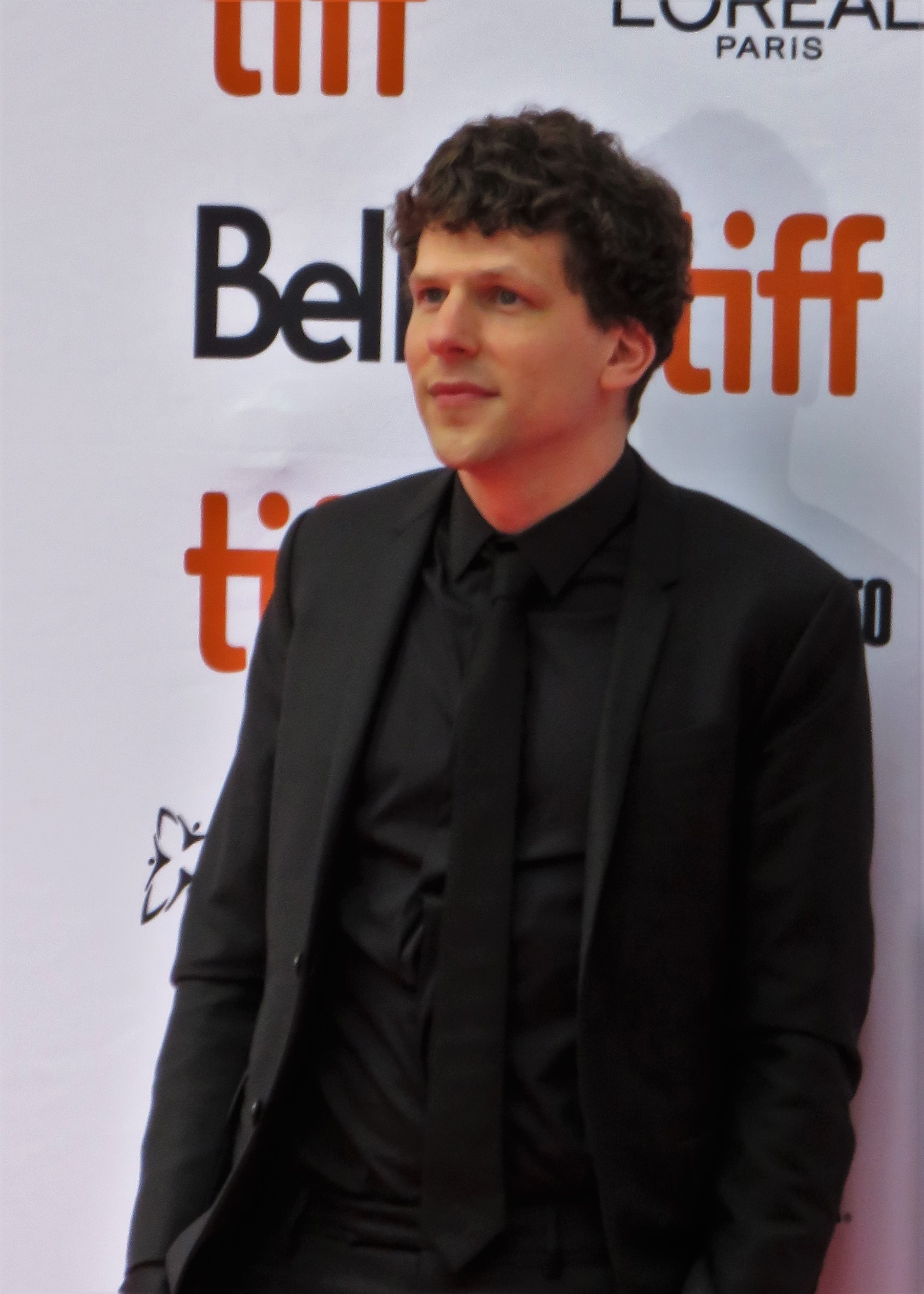
Jesse Eisenberg at the premiere of The Hummingbird Project at the 2018 Toronto International Film Festival

Eisenberg starred alongside Alexander Skarsgård in the role of an intermediary in the financial sector in Kim Nguyen's tech drama The Hummingbird Project that was released in 2018. In the same year, he produced Jeremy Workman's documentary The World Before Your Feet, which follows a 37-year-old man named Matt Green who has walked over 9,000 miles on the streets of New York City. In an interview with Variety, Eisenberg talked about the film, stating, "it's this fantastic tour of New York City. But more than that, its central character has this unusual relationship to his environment. He's simultaneously a tourist and a philosopher." The documentary premiered to critical acclaim at the 2018 South by Southwest Film Festival where it was acquired by distributor Greenwich Entertainment. It was released theatrically in November 2018 and has an approval rating of 100% on Rotten Tomatoes. The same month he appeared in the Serbian TV series Žigosani u reketu as the owner of an NBA club.

In 2019, Eisenberg starred in the sequel Zombieland: Double Tap, directed by Ruben Fleischer. Writers of the first Zombieland, Rhett Reese and Paul Wernick, penned the script with David Callaham. Eisenberg's new play Happy Talk had its world premiere in 2019, with production by The New Group, marking his second collaboration with the company. The production is about "a suburban woman's efforts to take care of her family while starring in a community-theater production of South Pacific." Originally titled Yea, Sister, the show was directed by Scott Elliott.

=== 2020–present: Career expansion ===
Eisenberg portrayed Marcel Marceau in the 2020 film Resistance, written and directed by Jonathan Jakubowicz, which focused on Marceau's part in the French resistance during World War II. He also reappeared as Luthor in the post-credits scene for Zack Snyder's Justice League alongside Manganiello.

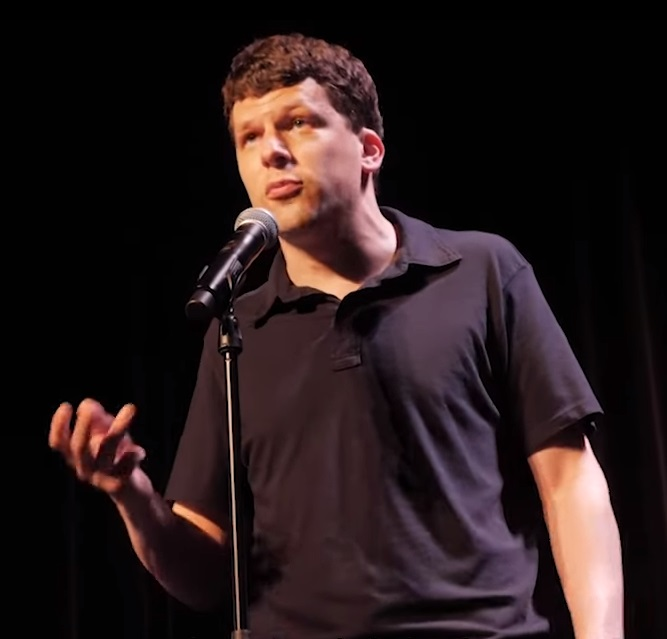
Jeese Eisenberg at the 2022 Cannes Film Festival

Jesse Eisenberg starred as Toby Fleishman in FX's limited series Fleishman is in Trouble opposite Lizzy Caplan. Created by Taffy Brodesser-Akner, it is an adaptation of her New York Times bestselling debut novel of the same name. The series premiered on FX on Hulu on November 17, 2022. Eisenberg made his feature directorial debut in When You Finish Saving the World which was adapted from his own original audiobook series. The film stars Julianne Moore and Finn Wolfhard and is produced by his Zombieland co-star, Stone. The film premiered at 2022 Sundance Film Festival and was released in cinemas on January 20, 2023. That same year he appeared as the main character, Ralphie, in the film Manodrome and received favorable reviews for his acting.

The following year, he directed and wrote the comedy-drama A Real Pain, a film which he also acted in opposite Kieran Culkin, who won the 2025 Academy Award for Best Performance by an Actor in a Supporting Role It had its world premiere at the 2024 Sundance Film Festival where it received positive reviews. Searchlight Pictures paid $10 million for the distribution rights. He earned two Golden Globe nominations for Best Actor in a Motion Picture – Musical or Comedy and Best Screenplay, as well as a nomination for the Academy Award for Best Original Screenplay.

He was the executive producer of the 2024 documentary Secret Mall Apartment.

Eisenberg's next project is The Debut, a musical comedy film starring Julianne Moore and Paul Giamatti, which he will direct, write, and also contribute original music for.

== Personal life ==
Jesse Eisenberg dated Anna Strout from 2002 to 2012 after they met on the set of The Emperor's Club, where she worked as an assistant to Lisa Bruce. He then dated Mia Wasikowska, his co-star in The Double, from 2013 to 2015. He later resumed his relationship with Strout and they married in 2017. Their son, Banner, was born in April 2017. They divide their time between Bloomington, Indiana (his wife's hometown), and New York City. He previously lived with his younger sister Hallie and her boyfriend, singer-songwriter Owen Danoff, until June 2016, when Hallie and Danoff moved to Nashville, Tennessee.

Eisenberg has played the drums since he was eight years old. His favorite band is Ween.

In 2007, Jesse Eisenberg started an online wordplay website with his cousin, a social design evangelist at Facebook, called OneUpMe. They re-launched the site in 2010, instead exclusively formatted for Facebook users.

Jesse Eisenberg does not use social media and said in 2016: "I'm terrified of that stuff. I live inside a bubble on purpose." When asked if he used Facebook to prepare for his role as its founder Mark Zuckerberg for The Social Network, his answer was "I signed on for, like, 20 seconds one time".

Jesse Eisenberg is an alumnus of the Bloomington Playwrights Project and has become deeply involved with the city of Bloomington, Indiana. He is a supporter of Indiana University Bloomington and has donated to and volunteered with Middle Way House, a domestic violence program that his mother-in-law led for three decades. He is a fan of the Indiana Pacers basketball team. For an article he wrote for InStyle magazine, he played a game of one-on-one with Indiana University women's basketball player Tyra Buss. He is also a long-time fan of the Indy Thunder beep baseball team and its founder Darnell Booker.

On December 30, 2025, Jesse Eisenberg made an altruistic kidney donation to a stranger at NYU Langone Health after being inspired by the philosophy of effective altruism.

Jesse Eisenberg has Polish-Jewish ancestry. His family lived in Krasnystaw until World War II, and his wife's family is from Łódź. In May 2024, he revealed he had applied for Polish citizenship, reportedly to help "create better relationships between Jews and Polish people". The citizenship was granted on March 4, 2025, by the President of Poland Andrzej Duda in New York.

== Charity work and other interests ==
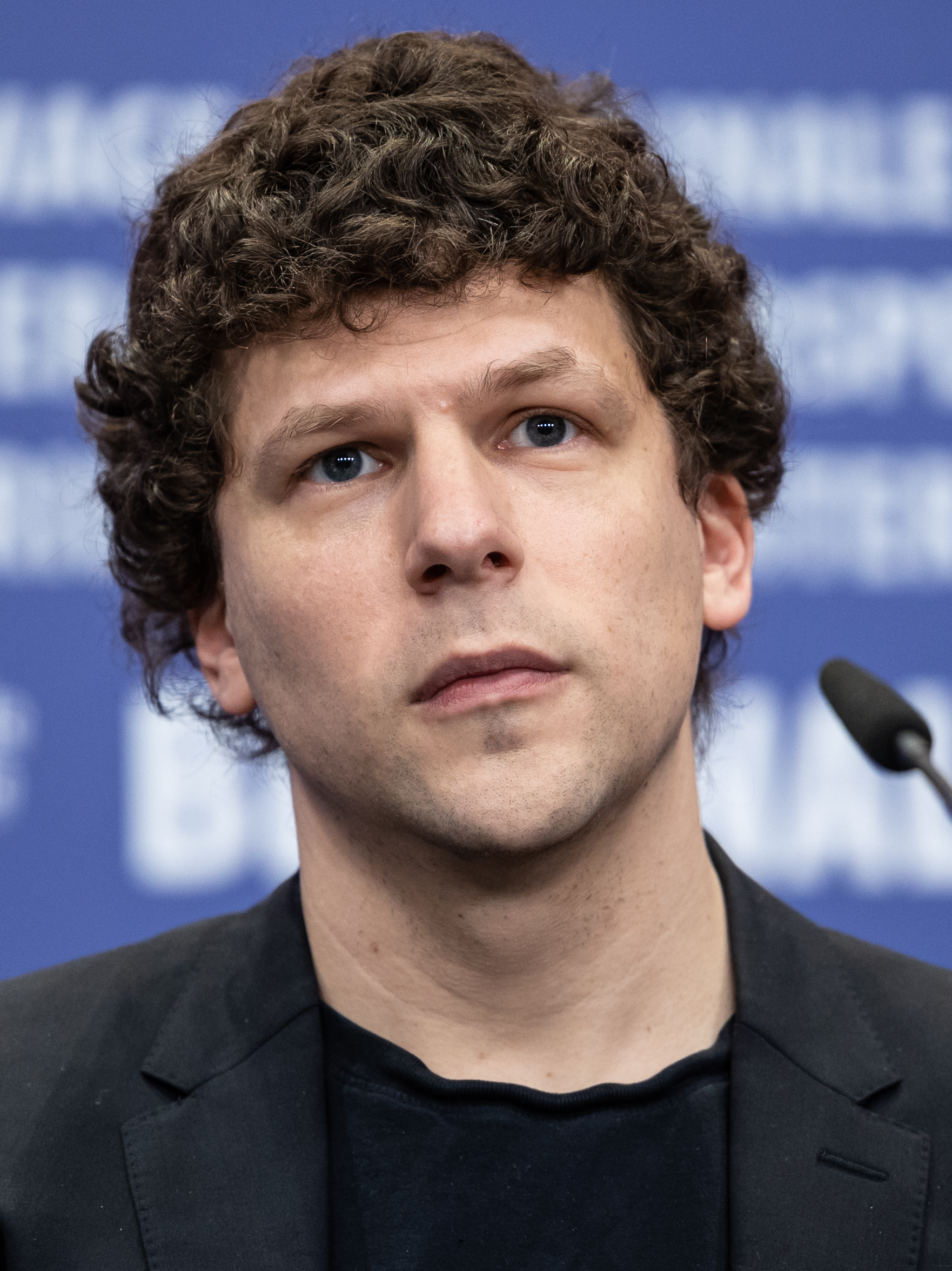
Eisenberg at the 2023 Berlin Film Festival

Eisenberg collaborated with Child Mind Institute in their #MyYoungerSelf project, where "each day in May a prominent individual will speak to his or her younger self about growing up with a mental health or learning disorder." In a video published on May 2, he spoke about his OCD and anxiety growing up.

Eisenberg is fond of cats and has been involved in fostering animals. He has been associated with Farm Sanctuary and has presented at several of their galas. In 2015 he stated, "I'm like 95% vegetarian."

During the 2014 Gaza War, Eisenberg visited Beit Lessin Theater in Tel Aviv for the premiere of a Hebrew adaptation of The Revisionist, going against advice from the US State Department to not travel to the region and visiting cities in Israel such as Jerusalem and Haifa.

In September 2015, Eisenberg announced that from November, he would match donations made to Middle Way House, a domestic violence shelter in Bloomington, Indiana, up to $100,000 until April 3, 2016. All contributions went toward the organization's mortgage payment fund that was matched by a committee, led by Eisenberg. On the shelter, Eisenberg said, "It's an incredible collective. It's the kind of place where the residents go through their wonderful program and end up working there. It's saved so many lives." In an interview with Variety in March 2018, Eisenberg stated that he has raised almost $1 million for the shelter.

Eisenberg is a cast member with Theater of War, a performing arts non-profit that presents readings of Sophocles's Ajax and Philoctetes to military and civilian communities across the United States and Europe. "As an actor, sometimes you feel limited by the role you're in; stories without much meaning. [Theatre of War] allows you do something that has more substance and benefits people ... It's a greater purpose than just entertainment," Eisenberg said of the organization.

Eisenberg also works in performing for Voices of a People's History of the United States, which is an organization that works to "encourage civic engagement and to further history education by bringing the rich history of the United States to life through public readings of primary source materials." He read Howard Zinn's "The Problem is Civil Obedience" (1970) for Voices of a People's History as part of "NYU Portraits" 2011 event. Eisenberg is involved with Keep America Beautiful, which "[engages] individuals to take greater responsibility for improving their community environments," as well as Shoe Revolt, a "hybrid start-up company that auctions celeb shoes to raise funds to deploy a social franchising model which aims to educate, engage, and empower youth to take the lead in the fight against domestic sex trafficking through peer-to-peer involvement, training, activism and social enterprise development."

On September 12, 2016, Eisenberg, Cate Blanchett, Chiwetel Ejiofor, Peter Capaldi, Douglas Booth, Neil Gaiman, Keira Knightley, Juliet Stevenson, Kit Harington, and Stanley Tucci were featured in a video from the United Nations' refugee agency UNHCR to help raise awareness about the global refugee crisis. The video, titled "What They Took With Them," has the actors reading a poem, written by Jenifer Toksvig and inspired by primary accounts of refugees, and is part of UNHCR's #WithRefugees campaign, which also includes a petition to governments to expand asylum to provide further shelter, integrating job opportunities and education.

Eisenberg participated in the inaugural "The 24 Hour Musicals: Los Angeles" on July 17, 2017, at the United Artists Theater, Ace Hotel. He composed the music and co-wrote, alongside his writing partner, Elizabeth Meriwether, Shoshana and Her Lovers, a musical about four lesbian sisters. The event proceeds went to the Dramatists Legal Defense Fund, a "nonprofit arm of the Dramatists Guild of America which advocates for the freedom of expression and advocates on behalf of all who are confronting censorship on stages across America." He previously acted in 24 Hour Plays: On Broadway 2011 and 2015, both times for New York's Urban Arts Partnership. He was a special guest at the 2011 Urban Arts Partnership Prom and was an Honorary Chair on the organisation's 25th Anniversary Gala Benefit Committee. On March 29, Urban Arts Partnership announced Eisenberg as a special guest for its 2018 gala AmplifiED, dedicated to New Yorkers fighting inequality in public education.

Eisenberg was among a small group of actors and musicians who performed at The People's Summit 2017 in June, "a three-day conference of 4,000 left-wing activists and progressive political groups," as part of an adaptation of Howard Zinn's Voices of a People's History of the United States. The production, titled "The People Speak," was performed after Senator Bernie Sanders's keynote address. Eisenberg was cast by his brother-in-law Anthony Arnove, who, along with Zinn, edited Voices of a People's History of the United States.

Eisenberg spoke at a rally in support of Democratic Illinois gubernatorial candidate Daniel Biss on March 10, 2018, as well as at a meet and greet hosted by Reclaim Chicago and University of Chicago Student Action the day before, alongside State Representative Will Guzzardi. He filmed two videos for the campaign, one for Biss's Facebook account and one for the Biss For Illinois YouTube platform.

== Acting credits and awards ==
According to the review aggregator site Rotten Tomatoes, Eisenberg's most critically acclaimed films are Roger Dodger (2002), The Squid and the Whale (2005), Adventureland (2009), Zombieland (2009), The Social Network (2010), The End of the Tour (2015), Wild Indian (2021), and A Real Pain (2024).

Eisenberg has been recognized by the Academy of Motion Picture Arts and Sciences for the following:

- 83rd Academy Awards: Best Actor, nomination, for The Social Network (2010)
- 97th Academy Awards: Best Original Screenplay, nomination, for A Real Pain (2024)

== See also ==
- List of Polish Academy Award winners and nominees
