= BLU-43 Dragontooth =

US air-dropped anti-personnel land mine

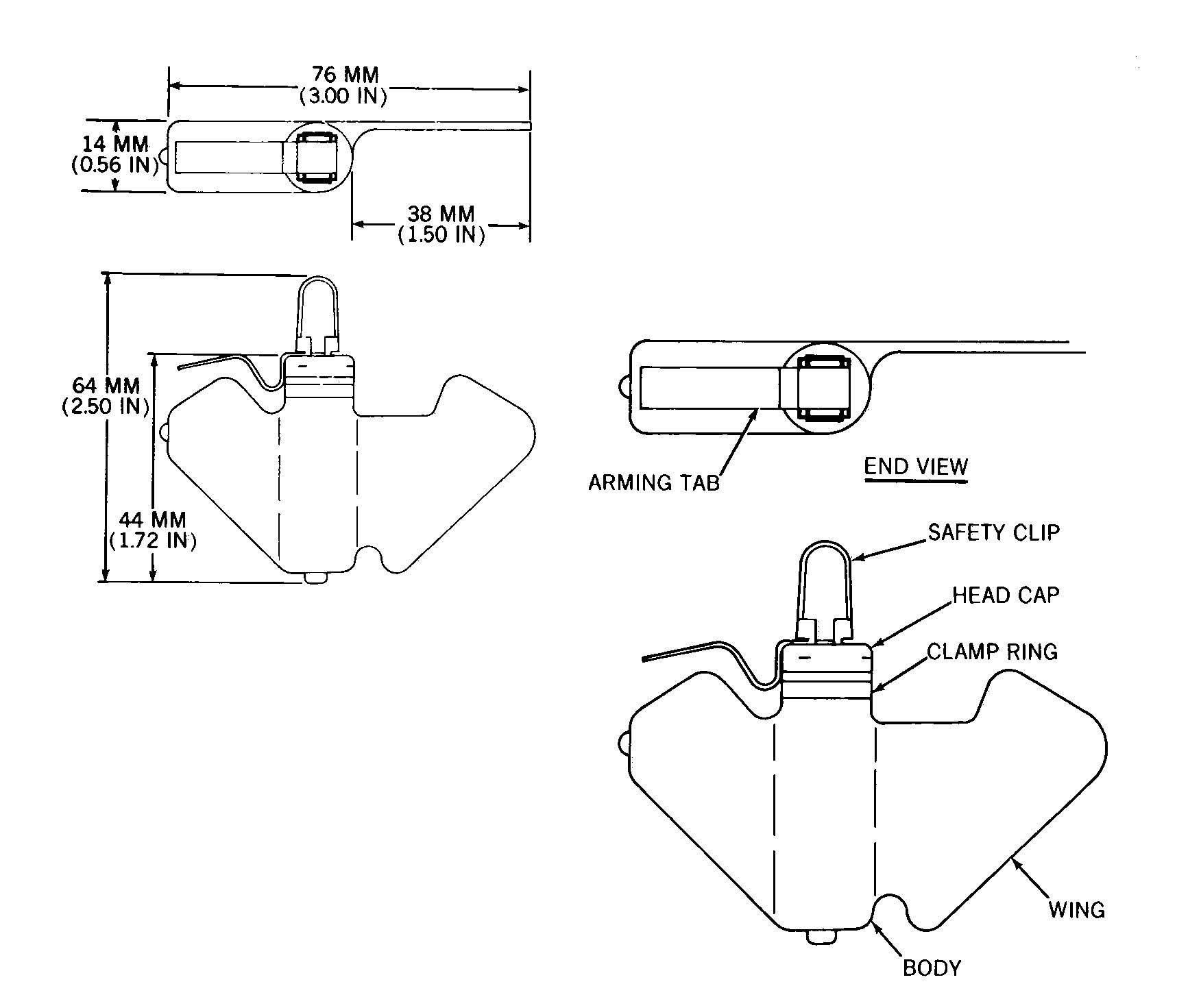
BLU-43/B schematic: external

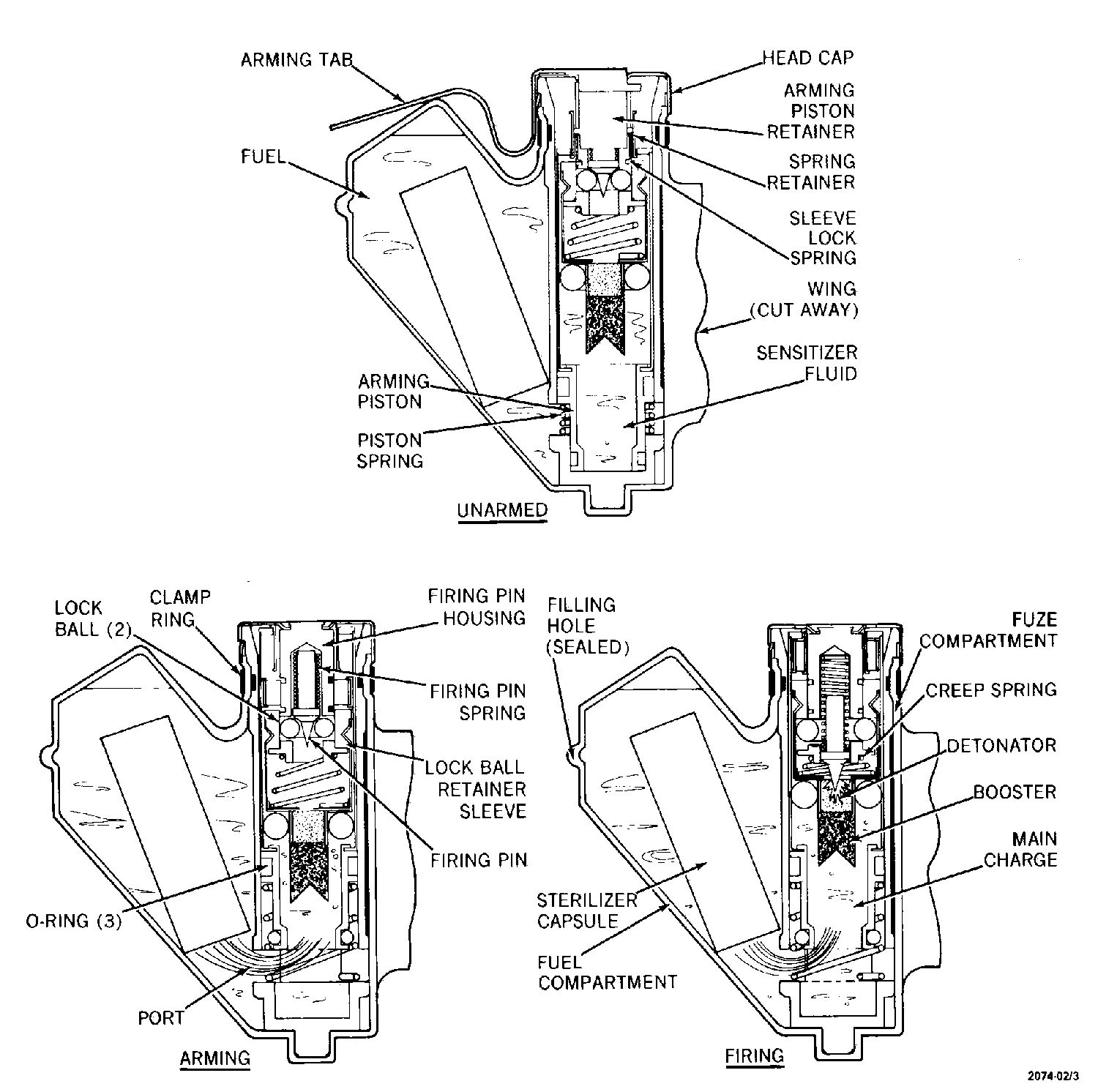
BLU-43/B schematic: internal cutaway view

BLU-43/B and BLU-44/B (Bomb Live Unit) "Dragontooth" were air-dropped cluster-type land mines used by the United States during the Vietnam War. It is chemically activated and has a relatively low explosive content, typically maiming rather than killing.

== Overview ==
The Dragontooth was designed during the Vietnam War as part of a number of programs designed to prevent infiltration into South Vietnam. Dragontooth was one of several airborne land mines tested, being preferred by the military because they could be used to deny access to large areas to foot traffic. Its area-denial qualities were exemplified in the fact that the explosive content of any individual mine was readily capable of killing the victim, being powerful enough to remove a person's foot, but potentially incapable of even flattening the tire of a truck passing over it.

The use of Dragontooth mines in Vietnam went largely unnoticed, likely as a product of its essentially classified usage primarily in Laos as part of Operation Igloo White. Production of the system had ceased by 1970, and it was predicted that existing stocks would be exhausted by the end of 1971.

In stark contrast to the lack of public commentary on the Dragontooth system, the subsequent Soviet equivalent, the PFM-1, spurred a lot of controversy after being used in Afghanistan during the Soviet intervention in Afghanistan, being a key element leading to the International Campaign to Ban Landmines.

== Design ==
The mine itself is made out of plastic, and is hydraulically activated and contact/pressure detonated. The color of the plastic varied and could be olive drab, tan, brown, or camouflaged, and had no painted or molded markings. Each mine contained a small amount of liquid nitromethane/nitroethane explosive and was designed with a shape that would cause it to spiral down to the ground, removing the need for a parachute. A chemical self-neutralization system was used in the mines, rendering the main explosive content inert after a period of time after activation. The two major variants, the BLU–43/B and BLU–44/B, differ only in the process by which they were thus "sterilized." However the reliability of the mechanism was largely unknown, and the detonator and booster charge could still present a hazard.

The complete Dragontooth system involved the loading of either the BLU–43/B or BLU–44/B (or its variant BLU–44A/B) into complete cluster munitions. A total of 120 BLU–43/B fit into a single CDU–2/B cluster adapter, forty of which were then loaded into a SUU-13/A cluster dispenser to form the complete CBU-28/A cluster munition. An identical number of BLU–44/B mines loaded into an identical number of CDU–3/B adapters fitted to the SUU–13/A dispenser formed the complete CBU–37/A. The SUU–13/A was a cluster dispenser that remained attached to the aircraft, dispensing cluster adapters of mines as the aircraft flew forward, unlike cluster bombs, which are released from an aircraft and then dispense their submunitions.

== Specifications ==
- Weight: 20 g (0.71 oz)
- Length: 75 mm (3.0 in)
- Width: 45 mm (1.8 in) (when armed)
- Depth: 45 mm (1.8 in)
- Explosive content: 9 g (0.32 oz) of a nitromethane-nitroethane mixture
- Sensitizer: propylenediamine and methanol

== See also ==
- Gravel mine, a small US made fabric wrapped mine used in Vietnam.
- PFM-1 mine Soviet/Russian counterpart.
