= GBU Indoor Stadium =

Indoor stadium in Uttar Pradesh, India

Gautam Buddha University Indoor Stadium
- GBU Indoor Stadium
- Interactive map of Gautam Buddha University Indoor Stadium
- Location: Greater Noida, Uttar Pradesh, India
- Coordinates: 28.4256°N 77.5284°E
- Owner: Gautam Buddha University
- Operator: Gautam Buddha University
- Capacity: 2,000

Construction
- Opened: 2015

Tenants
- Pro Wrestling League; 2015-

GBU Indoor Stadium or Gautam Buddha University Indoor Stadium is an indoor stadium located in the campus of Gautam Buddha University area of Greater Noida in Uttar Pradesh, India. GBU Indoor Stadium is one wing of Eklavya Sports Complex which consists of a separate cricket stadium, hockey stadium, football stadium, track and field ground, basketball and volleyball courts, and other sports facilities. The stadium was built in 2015 with a cost of ₹78 crore (780,000,000) for the purpose of promoting indoor sport in the city. The stadium has international standards as a table tennis court, an outdoor basketball court, a badminton court as well as TT complex.

The stadium was used by Pro Wrestling League. The stadium is also non-sports activities like exhibitions, seminars, and cultural activities.
