= Association of University Bible Groups of France =

The Association of University Bible Groups of France (Association des Groupes Bibliques Universitaires de France) is an evangelical Christian student movement with affiliate groups on university campuses in France. It is a member of the International Fellowship of Evangelical Students.

== History ==
In 1942, during the German occupation of France, some students began to meet in Aix-en-Provence in order to pray and study the Bible together. They were encouraged by M. René Pache, the founder of the Swiss GBU in 1932 and vice-president of IFES in 1947, who was the speaker at the first GBU camp in Anduze in 1943. Immediately afterwards, groups of university and high school students were formed in Marseille, Montpellier, Nîmes and Alès, and a year or two later in Grenoble, Lyon, Paris and Bordeaux. The “Union des GBU de France” was officially established in 1950.

The events of 1968 sent shock waves that tremendously affected university life and reverberated within the GBU. The following decade was one of unprecedented development. Groups multiplied, more students were committed and became members of the GBU, large Easter congresses were organised, more people were contacted In 1976, the PBU (Presses Bibliques Universitaires]) were established jointly with the Swiss and Belgian GBUs. Books were published on issues such as culture, ideologies, nuclear power, poetry, etc.

Around 1,000 students currently gather weekly in over 90 groups in France.

== Supporters ==
When they have finished their studies, students are invited to remain members of AGBUF in order to ensure the continuity of the movement and its development.

The Friends of the GBU used to be organised in a separate organisation. The AGBUF is now made both of students who take an active role in local groups and of post-graduates. The latter are willing to help maintain and develop the movement they entered during their studies. These post-graduates and friends are invited to create local support groups in order to help to develop local GBU groups.

== Organization ==
They bring together students who are eager to study the Bible. They provide them with the opportunity to meet at or around universities and to deepen their knowledge together with other students.

Local groups are run autonomously. The GBU is a student organisation. All its student activities are under the responsibility of the Student Executive Committee which reports to a supervisory board, the National Council. The main activity is reading the Bible together. Meetings are open to all and everyone is free to share their beliefs concerning the Scriptures. At the international level, the French GBU are a founding member of IFES (International Fellowship of Evangelical Students).
