= List of awards and nominations received by Jesse Eisenberg =

Jesse Eisenberg awards and nominations
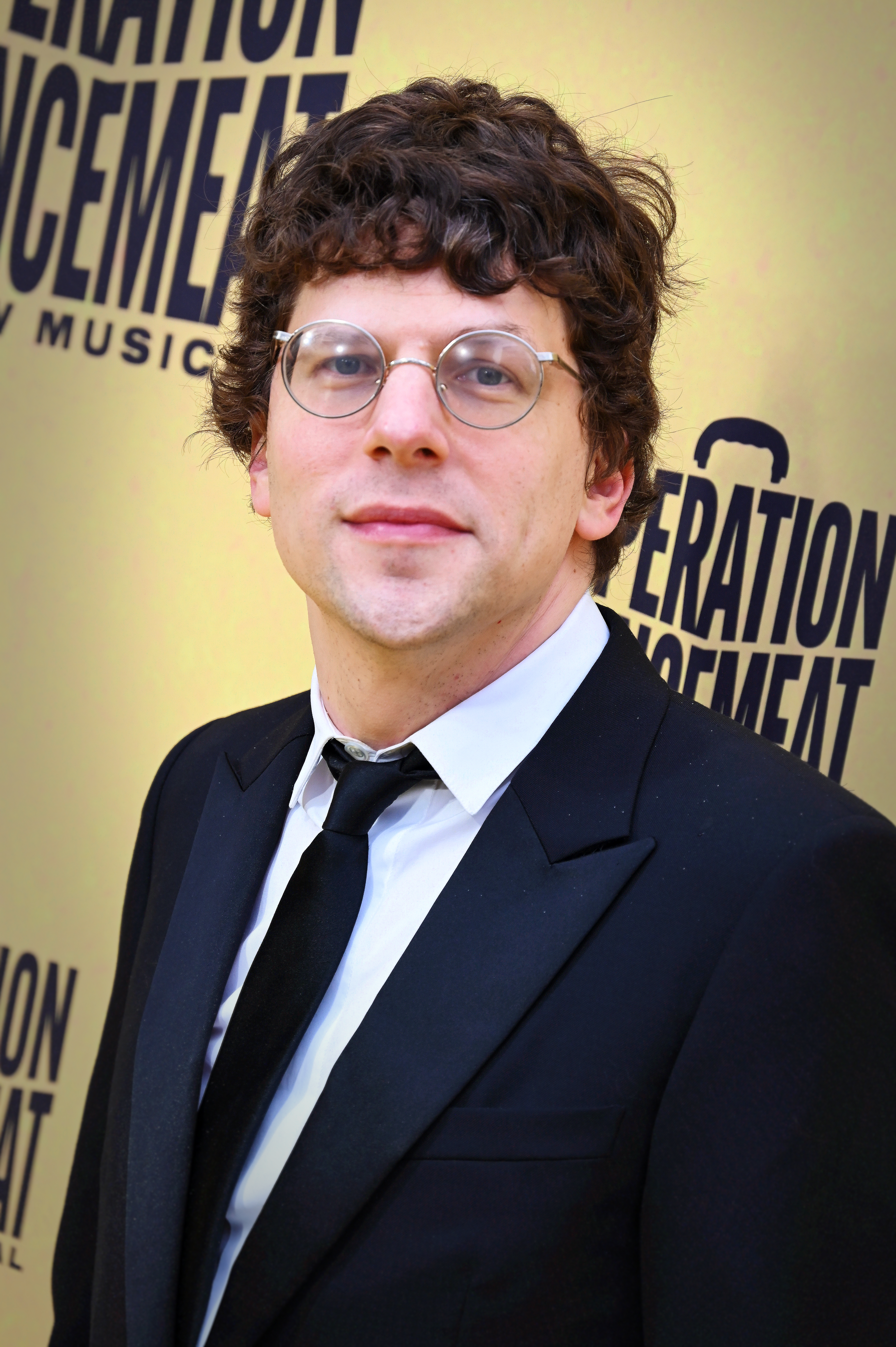
- Eisenberg in 2025 at the Opening night performance of musical Operation Mincemeat on Broadway
Awards and nominations
Award	Wins	Nominations
Academy Awards	0	2
British Academy Film Awards	1	3
Golden Globe Awards	0	3
Screen Actors Guild Awards	0	2
Producers Guild of America Awards	0	1
Writers Guild of America Awards	0	1

Totals (Note: Certain award groups do not simply award one winner. They acknowledge several different recipients, have runners-up, and have third place. Since this is a specific recognition and is different from losing an award, runner-up mentions are considered wins in this award tally. For simplification and to avoid errors, each award in this list has been presumed to have had a prior nomination.)
- Wins: 27
- Nominations: 82

American actor, playwright and filmmaker Jesse Eisenberg has received numerous accolades and nominations throughout his acting career. He is best known for playing Facebook founder Mark Zuckerberg in The Social Network (2010), for which he received BAFTA Award, Golden Globe, and Academy Award nominations in the Best Actor category.

== Major associations ==
=== Academy Awards ===
Year	Category	Nominated work	Result	Ref.
2011	Best Actor	The Social Network	Nominated	
2025	Best Original Screenplay	A Real Pain	Nominated	

=== British Academy Film Awards ===
Year	Category	Nominated work	Result	Ref.
2010	Rising Star Award		Nominated	
2011	Best Actor in a Leading Role	The Social Network	Nominated	
2025	Best Original Screenplay	A Real Pain	Won	

=== Golden Globe Awards ===
Year	Category	Nominated work	Result	Ref.
2011	Best Actor in a Motion Picture – Drama	The Social Network	Nominated	
2025	Best Actor in a Motion Picture – Musical or Comedy	A Real Pain	Nominated	
2025	Best Screenplay	A Real Pain	Nominated	

=== Screen Actors Guild Awards ===
Year	Category	Nominated work	Result	Ref.
2011	Outstanding Actor in a Leading Role	The Social Network	Nominated	
2011	Outstanding Cast in a Motion Picture	The Social Network	Nominated	

=== Producers Guild of America Awards ===
Year	Category	Nominated work	Result	Ref.
2025	Best Theatrical Motion Picture	A Real Pain	Nominated	

=== Writers Guild of America Awards ===
Year	Category	Nominated work	Result	Ref.
2025	Best Original Screenplay	A Real Pain	Nominated	

== Film critics awards ==
=== Broadcast Film Critics Association ===
Year	Nominated work	Category	Result	Ref.
2006	The Squid and the Whale	Best Young Performer	Nominated	
2011	The Social Network	Best Actor	Nominated	

=== Chicago Film Critics Association ===
Year	Nominated work	Category	Result	Ref.
2011	The Social Network	Best Actor	Nominated	

=== Dallas–Fort Worth Film Critics Association ===
Year	Nominated work	Category	Result	Ref.
2005	The Squid and the Whale	Best Supporting Actor	Nominated	
2010	The Social Network	Best Actor	Nominated	

=== IndieWire Critics Poll ===
Year	Nominated work	Category	Result	Ref.
2010	The Social Network	Best Actor	Runner-up	

=== London Film Critics' Circle ===
Year	Nominated work	Category	Result	Ref.
2011	The Social Network	Actor of the Year	Nominated	

=== National Society of Film Critics ===
Year	Nominated work	Category	Result	Ref.
2011	The Social Network	Best Actor	Won	

=== Online Film Critics Society ===
Year	Nominated work	Category	Result	Ref.
2011	The Social Network	Best Actor	Nominated	

=== San Diego Film Critics Society ===
Year	Nominated work	Category	Result	Ref.
2010	The Social Network	Best Actor	Nominated	
2010	The Social Network	Best Performance by an Ensemble (shared with the others)	Nominated	

=== St. Louis Film Critics Association ===
Year	Nominated work	Category	Result	Ref.
2010	The Social Network	Best Actor	Nominated	

=== Toronto Film Critics Association ===
Year	Nominated work	Category	Result	Ref.
2011	The Social Network	Best Actor	Won	

=== Vancouver Film Critics Circle ===
Year	Nominated work	Category	Result	Ref.
2010	The Social Network	Best Actor	Nominated	

=== Village Voice Film Poll ===
Year	Nominated work	Category	Result	Ref.
2010	The Social Network	Best Actor	Won	

=== Washington D.C. Area Film Critics Association ===
Year	Nominated work	Category	Result	Ref.
2010	The Social Network	Best Actor	Nominated	
2010	The Social Network	Best Ensemble (shared with the others)	Nominated	

== Film festival awards ==
=== Abu Dhabi Film Festival ===
Year	Nominated work	Category	Result	Ref.
2013	The Double	Best Actor	Won	

=== American Film Festival (Poland) ===
Year	Nominated work	Category	Result	Ref.
2024	A Real Pain	Indie Star Award	Awarded	

=== Big Apple Film Festival ===
Year	Nominated work	Category	Result	Ref.
2008	—	NY Emerging Talent Award	Won	

=== Capri Hollywood International Film Festival ===
Year	Nominated work	Category	Result	Ref.
2009	Solitary Man	Capri Exploit Award	Won	

=== Film Club's The Lost Weekend ===
Year	Nominated work	Category	Result	Ref.
2016	Louder Than Bombs	Best Ensemble Cast (shared)	Won	

=== Karlovy Vary International Film Festival ===
Year	Award	Achievement	Result	Ref.
2026	Festival President's Award	Fundamental contribution to the development of film and cinema	Honored	

=== Palm Springs International Film Festival ===
Year	Nominated work	Category	Result	Ref.
2011	The Social Network	Ensemble Cast Award (shared)	Won	

=== San Diego International Film Festival ===
Year	Nominated work	Category	Result	Ref.
2002	Roger Dodger	Most Promising New Actor	Won	

=== Sarajevo Film Festival ===
Year	Nominated work	Category	Result	Ref.
2022	—	Honorary Heart of Sarajevo	Won	

=== Sundance Film Festival ===
Year	Nominated work	Category	Result	Ref.
2024	A Real Pain	Waldo Salt Screenwriting Award	Won	

=== Vail Film Festival ===
Year	Nominated work	Category	Result	Ref.
2008	—	Rising Star Award	Won	

== Film industry awards ==
=== Alliance of Women Film Journalists ===
Year	Nominated work	Category	Result	Ref.
2011	The Social Network	Best Actor (EDA)	Nominated	

=== Awards Circuit Community ===
Year	Nominated work	Category	Result	Ref.
2005	The Squid and the Whale	Best Actor in a Supporting Role	Nominated (ACCA)	
2005	The Squid and the Whale	Best Cast Ensemble (shared)	Nominated (ACCA)	
2010	The Social Network	Davis Award for Best Performance by an Actor in a Leading Role	Nominated	
2010	The Social Network	ACCA for Best Performance by an Actor in a Leading Role	Nominated	

=== CinemaCon, USA ===
Year	Nominated work	Category	Result	Ref.
2016	—	Male Star of the Year	Won	

=== Fangoria Chainsaw Awards ===
Year	Nominated work	Category	Result	Ref.
2016	—	Male Star of the Year	Won	

=== Gold Derby Awards ===
Year	Nominated work	Category	Result	Ref.
2006	The Squid and the Whale	Ensemble Cast (shared)	Nominated	
2011	The Social Network	Ensemble Cast (shared)	Nominated	
2011	The Social Network	Lead Actor	Nominated	

=== Golden Raspberry Awards ===
Year	Nominated work	Category	Result	Ref.
2017	Batman v Superman: Dawn of Justice	Worst Supporting Actor	Won	

=== Gotham Awards ===
Year	Nominated work	Category	Result	Ref.
2003	Roger Dodger	Breakthrough Actor	Nominated	
2005	The Squid and the Whale	Best Ensemble Cast (shared)	Won	
2009	Adventureland	Best Ensemble Performance (shared)	Nominated	

=== Hollywood Film Awards ===
Year	Nominated work	Category	Result	Ref.
2010	The Social Network	Ensemble of the Year (shared	Won	

=== IGN Summer Movie Awards ===
Year	Nominated work	Category	Result	Ref.
2010	The Social Network	Best Actor	Nominated	

=== Independent Spirit Awards ===
Year	Nominated work	Category	Result	Ref.
2006	The Squid and the Whale	Best Supporting Male	Nominated	
2025	A Real Pain	Best Screenplay	Won	

=== Indiana Film Journalists Association ===
Year	Nominated work	Category	Result	Ref.
2010	The Social Network	Best Actor	Runner-up	

=== International Cinephile Society Awards ===
Year	Nominated work	Category	Result	Ref.
2011	The Social Network	Best Actor	Nominated	

=== Irish Film and Television Awards ===
Year	Nominated work	Category	Result	Ref.
2011	The Social Network	Best International Actor	Won	

=== National Board of Review ===
Year	Nominated work	Category	Result	Ref.
2010	The Social Network	Best Actor	Nominated	

=== Satellite Awards ===
Year	Nominated work	Category	Result	Ref.
2010	The Social Network	Best Actor in a Motion Picture, Drama	Nominated	
2024	A Real Pain	Best Actor in a Motion Picture – Musical or Comedy	Nominated	
2024	A Real Pain	Best Original Screenplay	Won	

=== Young Artist Awards ===
Year	Nominated work	Category	Result	Ref.
2000	Get Real	Best Performance in a TV Series – Young Ensemble (shared)	Nominated	

== Audience awards ==
=== Italian Online Movie Awards ===
Year	Nominated work	Category	Result	Ref.
2011	The Social Network	Best Actor (Miglior attore protagonista)	Nominated	

=== MTV Movie Awards ===
Year	Nominated work	Category	Result	Ref.
2010	Zombieland	Best Scared-As-S**t Performance	Nominated	
2011	The Social Network	Best Male Performance	Nominated	
2011	The Social Network	Best Line from a Movie "If you guys were the inventors of Facebook, you'd have invented Facebook."	Nominated	

=== National Film Awards, UK ===
Year	Nominated work	Category	Result	Ref.
2011	The Social Network	Performance of the Year	Nominated	

=== Teen Choice Awards ===
Year	Nominated work	Category	Result	Ref.
2010	Zombieland and Adventureland	Choice Movie: Male Breakout Star	Nominated	
2011	The Social Network	Choice Movie Actor: Drama	Nominated	
2016	Batman v Superman: Dawn of Justice	Choice Movie: Villain	Nominated	

== Directed Academy Award performances ==
Under Eisenberg's direction, these actors have received Academy Award wins and nominations for their performances in their respective roles.

Year	Performer	Film	Result
Academy Award for Best Supporting Actor
2025	Kieran Culkin	A Real Pain	Won
