= Diaminopropane =

1,2-Diaminopropane

1,3-Diaminopropane

Diaminopropane may refer to either of two isomeric chemical compounds:

- 1,2-Diaminopropane
- 1,3-Diaminopropane
