= CBU-24 =

American cluster bomb

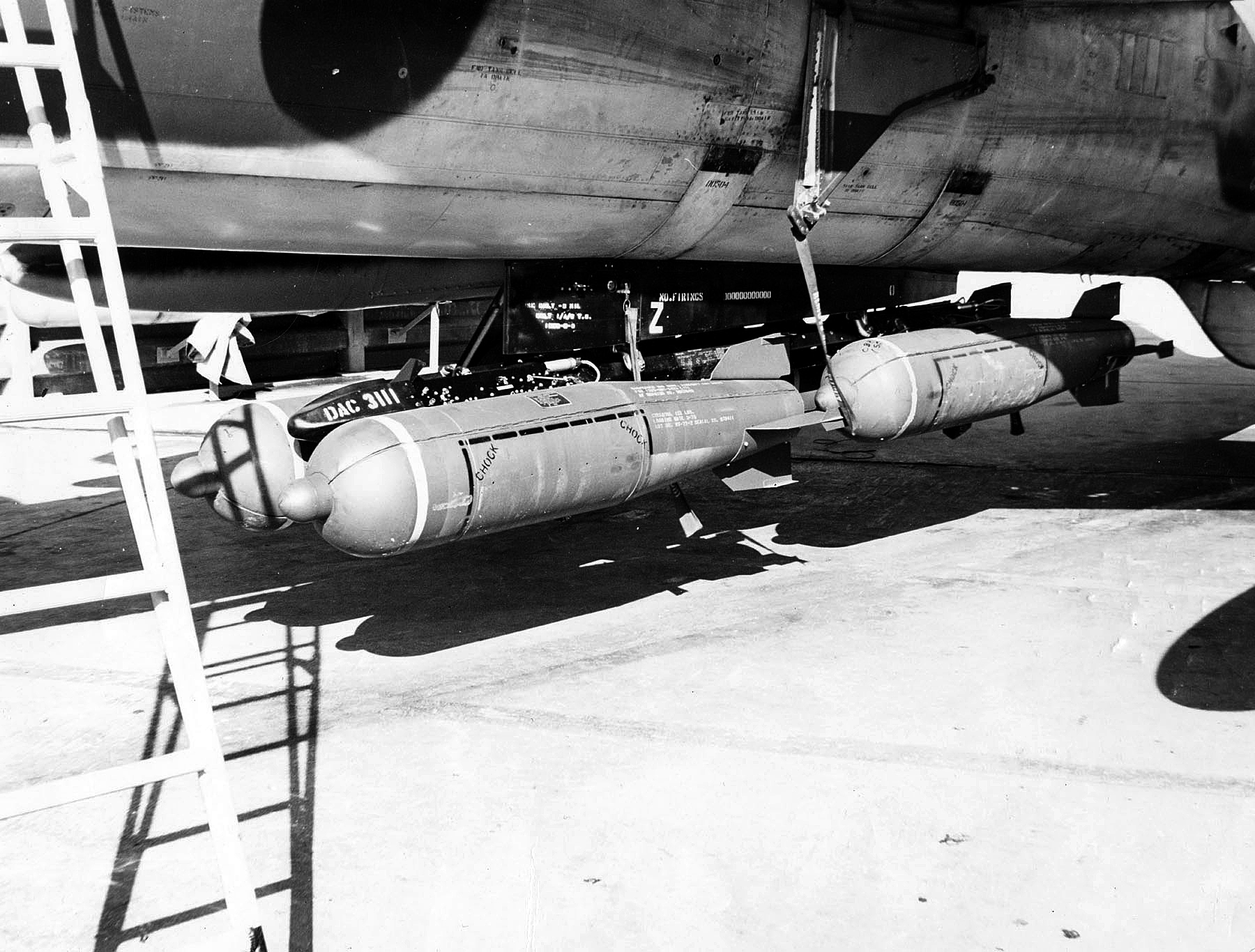
CBU-24 cluster bombs being carried by a US Air Force F-105 Wild Weasel.

The CBU-24 (Cluster Bomb Unit-24) is an unguided, aircraft delivered anti-personnel and anti-materiel weapon developed by the United States. Because it is an unguided weapon, the CBU-24 can be carried and dropped by any aircraft capable of carrying standard "dumb" or "iron" bombs.

The CBU-24 cluster bomb consists of a SUU-30 dispenser unit containing a payload of 665 tennis ball-sized BLU-26 or BLU-36 fragmentation submunitions, also known as bomblets. Once dropped from the delivery aircraft, the CBU-24 casing breaks open in-flight and releases the individual submunitions, scattering them over a large area.

Each submunition is designed to detonate and damage or destroy targets within the weapon's footprint by explosion, concussion and fragmentation effects. While most BLU-26 submunitions explode on impact, they can also be set for air-burst or fixed-period delayed detonation. The BLU-36 submunition has a random time-delay fuse and will detonate at some point after impact.

The time-delay function of the submunitions is designed to continue to deny the area to the enemy for some time after the initial attack and hamper clean up and casualty recovery operations.

While primarily designed as an anti-personnel weapon, the bomblets can also damage structures and soft vehicle targets within the target area.

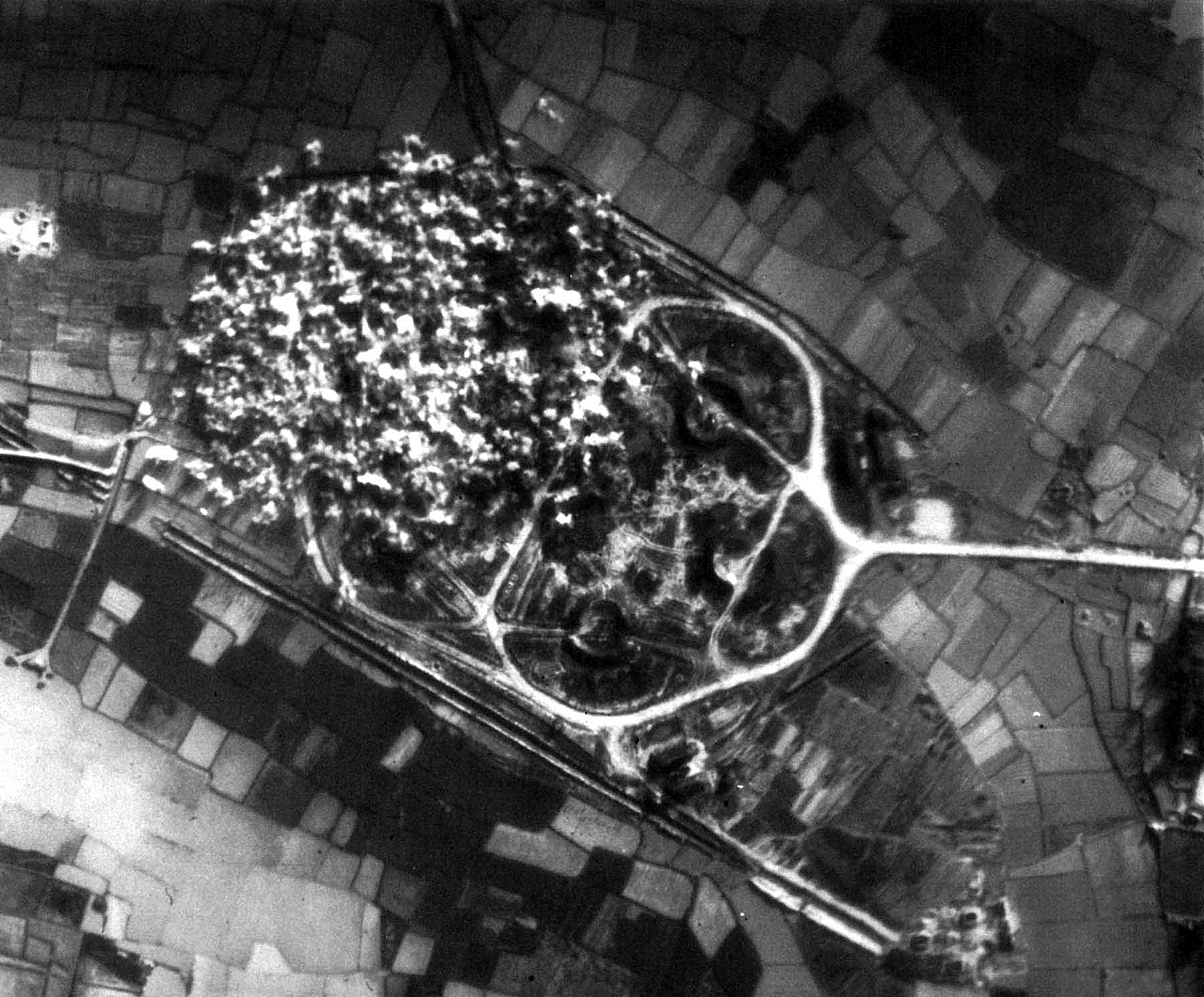
One half of an SA-2 Surface to Air missile site being hit with cluster bombs dropped from F-105 Wild Weasels.
