= BLU-80/B Bigeye bomb =

Concept for binary chemical bomb weapon

The BLU-80/B BIGEYE bomb was a developmental U.S. air-launched binary chemical weapon. The BIGEYE was a 500-pound (230 kg) class glide bomb with a radar altimeter fuze intended to disperse the binary generated nerve agent VX, made in flight from the non-lethal chemical components "QL" and sulfur only after aircraft release. The BLU-80-B was designed under the auspices of the U.S. Navy as a safe chemical weapons alternative in response to chemical weapons (CW) threats from the USSR and other actors. BIGEYE was a genuine tri-service program led by the U.S. Navy with significant U.S. Army and U.S. Air Force participation. Initially approved in the 1950s, the program persisted into the 1990s.

== Background ==
As the stockpile of U.S. unitary (live agent) chemical weapons began to show troubling leakage, the Department of Defense (DoD) became acutely aware of the safety hazard to military personnel and public backlash this could generate. It is now known that the Soviets experienced the same and likely worse leakage issues with their unitary live agent weapons. With this in mind, the Pentagon insisted that it needed a binary chemical weapons program to counter and deter a Soviet Union or third-world chemical attack threat.

The U.S. Army Chemical Corps was reactivated in 1976 to assess and deal with this threat, and with it came the increased desire to acquire a retaliatory chemical capability in the form of much safer binary chemical weapons. Initially, the United States was in Strategic Arms Limitation Talks with the Soviet Union, and then-President Jimmy Carter rejected U.S. Army requests for authorization of the binary chemical weapons program. The talks deteriorated, and President Carter eventually granted the Army request. However, at the last minute Carter pulled the provision from the budget. This action left the decision on a retaliatory binary chemical weapons option to the Ronald Reagan administration.

== History ==
BIGEYE (an acronym for Binary Internally Generated chemical weapon within the "EYE" series of 500-pound (230 kg) canister weapons) was the common name for the BLU-80/B, a concept conceived during the 1950s. During the 1970s at Pine Bluff Arsenal around 200 test articles were produced. Initial production contracts for the BIGEYE were awarded in June, 1988, to The Marquardt Company of Van Nuys, CA, the project's prime contractor for most of the program. The original timeline for the U.S. binary chemical weapons program called for the BIGEYE to be deployed by September 1988. President Reagan authorized the spending of more than $59 million in 1986 to revive the binary chemical weapons program. Under the original timeline, the BIGEYE was to be the second binary chemical weapon to be produced (the first being a binary artillery shell) with binary chemical agent rockets to follow. After a General Accounting Office (GAO) report pointed out numerous flaws in the program the U.S. Senate moved to effectively kill the binary chemical weapons program, including the BIGEYE bomb. In 1989 President George H. W. Bush announced that the U.S. would retain the option to produce such binary weapons. At the time of his announcement, 1992 was the earliest date BIGEYES were expected to be deployed.

== Specifications ==
The BIGEYE was an air-launched 500 pound-class canister weapon to be delivered by various U.S. Navy and Air Force aircraft. The interior of the weapon consisted of two separate containers of non-lethal chemical compounds, stored separately and assembled only immediately before flight, and then combined to create the active chemical nerve agent VX only after release from the aircraft. It was the storage separation of less aggressive chemical components that ensured safe storage/handling and simpler maintenance requirements. The bomb was a Navy weapon design that would atomize the percutaneous nerve agent VX over a targeted area by releasing the binary-generated agent while gliding through the air over the target.

The BIGEYE bomb weighed 595 lb (270 kg); 180 lb (82 kg) and would have generated the chemical agent VX. It was to have a length of 7 ft 6 in (2.29 m) and a diameter of 13.25 in (337 mm). The glide bomb had a wingspan of 1 ft 5.25 in (438.1 mm). The BIGEYE was not planned to have any internal guidance, propulsion or autopilot systems (hence its "glide bomb" designation).

== Problems and issues ==
The 25+ year old, on-again off-again BIGEYE bomb program was plagued with problems and controversy from its outset. Much of the controversy was based on analysis by the Government Accountability Office (GAO). Also criticized was the entire idea of a modern American chemical weapons program. Such a program, the argument went, would actually encourage others to develop chemical weapons, as opposed to acting as a deterrent.

The testing, which had mixed results, presented its own set of problems. In 1987 the Navy and Air Force conducted 70+ tests, results which were characterized as "very inconsistent" by the GAO. Following a test suspension and subsequent significant design improvements, vastly better weapons function and reliability results were achieved. Problems the Navy encountered with the BIGEYE included excessive pressure build-up, questions about the lethality of the chemical mixture resulting from variable mix times, and overall reliability concerns. Scientists debated the efficacy of the binary weapons program, especially since the BIGEYE had only been tested using simulants.

In the end, the BLU-80/B BIGEYE binary chemical weapon might possibly have been the tipping point in chemical weapons disarmament talks with the USSR, as the Soviets agreed to significant chemical weapons disarmament agreements immediately after successful operational test results of the BIGEYE resulting from improvements implemented by the U.S. Navy's Naval Air Weapons Center, China Lake.
