= BLU-3 Pineapple =

American fragmentation bomblet

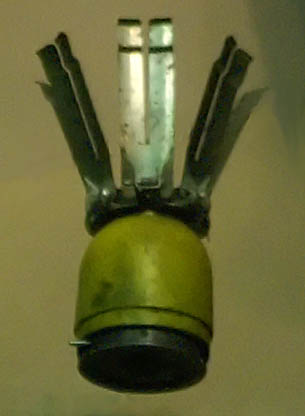
A BLU-3 cluster bomblet at the Imperial War Museum, London.

BLU-3 Pineapple was a cluster bomblet, 360 were deployed from the CBU-2A cluster bomb. It was used extensively in the Vietnam War by American forces. It was named "Pineapple" because of its appearance. On some Arc Light missions, the B-52Ds carried two SUU-24 dispensers in the bomb bay, containing a total of 10,656 bomblets.

The BLU-3/B 'Pineapple' was a fragmentation bomblet for use against personnel and unarmored targets. After release from the aerial dispenser, the bomblet was stabilized by six pop-out drag vanes. It detonated on impact, and dispersed 250 high-velocity steel pellets.

== Specifications ==
- Length: 3.75 inches (95 mm); with vanes extended: 6.7 inches (170 mm)
- Diameter: 2.75 inches (70 mm)
- Weight: 1.75 pounds (794 g)
- Warhead: 0.35 pounds (160 g) Cyclotol embedded with 200 steel pellets.
