= BLU-14 =

BLU-14/B
- Type: General-purpose bomb
- Place of origin: United States

Specifications
- Mass: 766 lb (347 kg)
- Length: 8 ft (2.4 m)
- Diameter: 11.25 in (286 mm)
- Filling: Destex ( +- 75% TNT 18.7% Al +- 5% wax +- 1.97% C6 graphite )
- Filling weight: 236 lb (107 kg)

The BLU-14/B was an American 347 kg (766 lb) ground-penetrating anti-vehicle mine for release by low-flying (down to 11 m (35 ft) altitude) aircraft. It was a derivative of the MLU-10/B 750 lb (340 kg) land mine, and therefore essentially identical in shape and weight to the BLU-31/B anti-vehicle demolition mine and bomb. The designation "BLU" stands for Bomb Live Unit, as opposed to "BDU" (Bomb Dummy Units) used for practice.

The BLU-14/B has a low, stable ricochet trajectory that is predictable within close limits. It will penetrate into the ground at an angle that is less than half that required by an M117 bomb. The BLU-14/B and MLU-10/B differ only in regard to their respective fusing.

All three weapons (the BLU-14, MLU-10, and MLU-31) have a blunt flat front end of 2.5 in (6.4 cm) thickness.
