= BLU-108 =

Air-delivered anti-vehicle submunition

The BLU-108 is an air-delivered submunition, containing four further smart "Skeet" warheads. The system is manufactured by Textron Systems Weapon & Sensor Systems since 1992. The BLU-108 is released from a munitions dispenser, with a parachute being used to slow its descent. It then fires the four rapidly rotating skeets, which use multi-mode optical sensors to identify a variety of targets ranging from tanks and missile launchers to railway locomotives and stationary aircraft. When the skeet passes over what it considers a high priority target (this priority can be changed prior to employment), it fires a 0.9 kg (2 lb) explosively formed penetrator providing armor-piercing and incendiary effects, as well as a fragmentation ring meant to damage any soft targets, primarily enemy personnel, in the immediate vicinity of the target.

== BLU-108/B specifications ==
- Length: 78.8 cm (31.0 in)
- Diameter: 13.3 cm (5.25 in)
- Maximum lateral dimension: 18.4 cm (7.25 in)
- Weight: 29.5 kg (65 lb)

== Skeet specifications ==
- Height: 9.5 cm (3.75 in)
- Diameter: 12.7 cm (5.0 in)
- Weight: 3.4 kg (7.5 lb)
- Seeker: Dual-mode active (laser) and passive (infrared) sensors
- Explosive: 945 g (2.08 lb) Octol
- Kill mechanism: Explosively formed penetrator and fragmentation

== Weapon systems ==
- AGM-154B Joint Standoff Weapon
- CBU-97 Sensor Fuzed Weapon
- U-ADD (Universal aerial delivery dispenser)
