= Chalcogenidotetrelate =

Chalcogenidotetrelates are chemical compounds containing a group 14 element, known as a tetrel, and a group 16 element, known as a chalcogen. The group 14 elements are carbon, silicon, germanium, tin, lead and flerovium. Flerovium compounds like this are unknown due to its short half-life. The group 16 elements are oxygen, sulfur, selenium, tellurium, polonium and livermorium. Livermorium compounds like this are unknown due to its short half-life. Chalcogenidotetrelates are a class of chalcogenidometalates. In chalcogenidotetrelates, the chalcogen atom is normally divalent, and the tetrel atom is normally tetravalent. The chalcogen atom has one or two single bonds, or one double bond to tetrel atoms. The tetrel atom has one, two, three or four single bonds to chalcogen atoms, or one double bond plus one or two single bonds to chalcogen atoms. The tetrel atom would normally have four bonds in a +4 oxidation state. Carbon differs significantly from the other elements in seldom having four single bonds to chalcogens, and so has few compounds in this class such as orthocarbonates.

== Properties ==
Chalcogenidotetrelates form numerous structures, from zero-dimensional simple tetrahedra, clusters or supertetrahedra, one-dimensional chains, two-dimensional layers or three-dimensional networks, which may also be porous.

=== Structures ===
The ortho-chalcogenidotetrelate anions [TE_{4}]^{4−} (T is a tetrel and E is a chalcogen) are tetrahedral in arrangement. A supertetrahedron can fuse 4 or 10 of these into a larger tetrahedral adamantane cluster [T_{4}E_{10}]^{4−} eg [Ge_{4}Se_{10}]^{4−}. Dimers that share a corner have formula [T_{4}E_{7}]^{6−}, and sharing an edge yield [T_{4}E_{6}]^{4−}.

== Natural occurrence ==
Chalcogenidotetrelates encompass the most common minerals on Earth, and other terrestrial planets in the form of silicates and carbonates. Feldspar, olivine, pyroxene and calcite are common. Other chalcogenidotetrelate minerals containing sulfur and other elements are known.

== Production ==
Chalcogenidotetrelates may be produced by heating together the chalcogen compounds of the desired ingredients. A high temperature flux of a molten salt may be used. Or solutions in amines or organic solvents may crystallise at low temperatures.

== Use ==
Chalcogenidotetrelates are researched to find ion-conductors, ion exchange materials, semiconductors, photovoltaics, photoluminescence, photocatalysts and non-linear optical materials.

== Related ==
Related materials include the chalcogenidotrielates, and organo-functionalized chalcogenidotetrelates, which have one or more organic groups attached to the tetrel atom.

== Subtypes ==
	tetrel	carbon	silicon	germanium	tin	lead	flerovium
chalcogen	chalcogenidotetrelate	chalcogenidocarbonate	chalcogenidosilicate	chalcogenidogermanate	chalcogenidostannate	chalcogenidoplumbate	chalcogenidoflerovate^{×}
oxygen	tetrelate	carbonate	silicate	germanate	stannate	plumbate	flerovate^{×}
sulfur	sulfidotetrelate	thiocarbonate	sulfidosilicate	sulfidogermanate	sulfidostannate	sulfidoplumbate	sulfidoflerovate^{×}
selenium	selenidotetrelate	selenidocarbonate	selenidosilicate	selenidogermanate	selenidostannate	selenidoplumbate	selenidoflerovate^{×}
tellurium	telluridotetrelate	telluridocarbonate	telluridosilicate	telluridogermanate	telluridostannate	telluridoplumbate	telluridoflerovate^{×}
polonium	polonidotetrelate^{×}	polonidocarbonate^{×}	polonidosilicate^{×}	polonidogermanate^{×}	polonidostannate^{×}	polonidoplumbate^{×}	polonidoflerovate^{×}
livermorium	livermoridotetrelate^{×}	livermoridocarbonate^{×}	livermoridosilicate^{×}	livermoridogermanate^{×}	livermoridostannate^{×}	livermoridoplumbate^{×}	livermoridoflerovate^{×}

^{×} Not known to exist.

Mixed chalcogen compounds or ions are also known.
