= Thiogermanate =

Class of chemical compounds

Sulfidogermanates or thiogermanates are chemical compounds containing anions with sulfur atoms bound to germanium. They are in the class of chalcogenidotetrelates. Related compounds include thiosilicates, thiostannates, selenidogermanates, telluridogermanates and selenidostannates.

Coordination of sulfur around germanium is tetrahedral meaning there are four sulfur atoms symmetrically arranged. This basic structure can form ortho salts with GeS_{4}^{4−}, oligomers, or polymeric structures. Similar structures are also formed with heavy group 13 and group 14 elements due to their relatively stronger bonds with sulfur. Light elements from these groups have lower affinity for sulfur, so there are fewer compounds like this for boron, aluminium, carbon, and silicon. Other heavy group 12 and 15 elements also form chalcogenidometallates which may have other kinds of coordination. Selenium forms similar compounds to sulfur in this family.

Where sulfur is deficient, an anion is not formed, and instead cation-like covalent compounds can exist with halogens, such as Ge_{4}S_{6}Br_{4}, or Ge_{4}S_{6}I_{4}.

== Production ==
The solvochemical method of production involves dissolving germanium oxide, sulfur and other salts in a heated solvent under pressure. The solvents can include simple alcohols, amines or N,N-dimethyl formamide. The containers can be glass tubes, quartz tubes, or teflon lined stainless steel.

== List ==
formula	name	system	space group	cell Å	volume	density	comments	ref
H_{4}Ge_{4}S_{10}	thiogermanic acid	triclinic	P1̅	a = 8.621, b = 9.899, c = 10.009, α = 85.963°, β = 64.714°, γ = 89.501°, Z = 2				
H_{2}Ge_{4}S_{9}	thiogermanic acid							
Li_{2}GeS_{3}		hexagonal	P6_{1}	a = 6.79364 c = 17.9072				
[CH_{3}NH_{3}]_{4}Ge_{2}S_{6}	tetrakis(methylammonium) bis(μ-sulfido)-tetrakis(sulfido)-di-germanium	triclinic	P1̅	a 7.3336 b 7.3760 c 10.0007, α 108.598° β 111.332° γ 90.297°				
[CH_{3}CH_{2}NH_{3}]_{4}Ge_{2}S_{6}•CH_{3}CH_{2}NH_{2}	tetrakis(ethylammonium) bis(μ-sulfido)-tetrakis(sulfido)-di-germanium ethylamine	orthorhombic	Pnma	a 7.8501 b 18.3444 c 17.4386				
[CH_{3}CH_{2}NH_{3}]_{3}[CH_{3}NH_{3}]Ge_{4}S_{10}	tris(diethylammonium) methylammonium hexakis(μ-sulfido)-tris(sulfido)-tetra-germanium		Pa3	a 17.9402 c 17.9402				
(NH_{4})_{2}[NH_{2}(CH_{3})_{2}]_{2}Ge_{2}S_{6}		monoclinic	P2_{1}/c	a = 6.965, b = 15.7195, c = 7.2045, β = 92.765°			band gap 3.50 eV	
(NH_{3}NH_{2})_{2}[(R^{N}Ge)_{2}(μ-S)_{2}S_{2}]								
[(R^{1}Ge)_{4}(μ-S)_{6}]	R^{1} = CMe_{2}CH_{2}COMe							
(trenH_{2})_{2}[Ge_{2}S_{6}]	tren = tris(2-aminoethyl)amine	monoclinic	C2/c	a=25.264 b=7.313 c=16.584 β=122.616 Z=4	2581	1.632	colourless	
(enH)_{4}Ge_{2}S_{6}	en = ethylenediamine	triclinic	P1̅	a 7.859 b 9.514 c 9.727, α 64.21° β 66.80° γ 84.92°				
Na_{4}Ge_{2}S_{6} · 14H_{2}O		triclinic	P1̅	a = 9.978, b = 7.202, c = 9.601, α = 108.41 β = 92.39, γ = 91.69° Z = 1				
Na_{6}Ge_{2}S_{7}								
Li_{4}MgGe_{2}S_{7}		monoclinic	Cc	a=16.872 b=6.771 c=10.156 β=95.169°			SHG 0.7 ×AGS	
Na(AlS_{2})(GeS_{2})_{4}		monoclinic	P2_{1}/n	a = 6.803, b = 38.207, c = 6.947, β = 119.17°				
Li_{10}GeP_{2}S_{12}		tetragonal					lithium ion conductor	
K_{6}Ge_{2}S_{7}								
[VO(dien)]_{2}GeS_{4}		orthorhombic	Pna2_{1}	a =19.831, b = 8.0814, c = 12.0889, Z = 4	1937.4			
{[V(en)_{2}]_{2}O}Ge_{2}S_{6}	en = ethylenediamine	monoclinic	P2_{1}/n	a=8.352 b=12.682 c=11.339 β=94.75 Z=2	1196.9	1.931	black	
[VO(dap)_{2}]_{2}Ge_{2}S_{6}·dap	dap = 1,2-diaminopropane	hexagonal	R2̅c ?	a=38.284 c=11.170 Z=18	14178	1.619	purple; hexagonal nanotubes	
Li_{4}MnGe_{2}S_{7}		monoclinic	Cc	a=16.833 b=6.709 c=10.121 β=94.76° Z=4	1139.1	2.637	light pink	
{[Mn(2,2′-bipy)_{2}(H_{2}O)]_{2}Ge_{4}S_{10}}·3H_{2}O	bipy = bipyridine	triclinic	P1̅	a=10.6511 b=13.0443 c=22.995, α=79.539 β=77.653° γ=79.737° Z=2	3036.6	1.570		
{Mn(tepa)}_{2}(μ-Ge_{2}Se_{6})		tetragonal	I4_{1}/a					
Mn_{2}(en)_{4}Ge_{2}S_{6}	en=ethylenediamine							
[Mn(en)_{3}]_{2}Ge_{2}S_{6}		monoclinic	C2/c	a 15.115 b 10.530 c 22.897, 118.777°				
Mn_{2}(dap)_{4}Ge_{2}S_{6}	dap = 1,2-diaminopropane							
H_{2}dienMnGeS_{4}	dien = diethylenetriamine							
[(dien)_{2}Mn]Ge_{2}S_{4}	dien=diethylenetriamine	orthorhombic	P2_{1}2_{1}2_{1}	a=9.113, b=12.475, c=17.077, Z=4	1941		1D [Ge_{2}S_{4}]^{2−} chains	
Mn_{3}Ge_{2}S_{7}(NH_{3})_{4}		orthorhombic	Pbcn	a=9.107 b=13.923 c=12.750 Z=4	1616.6	2.476	green	
[Mn^{II}(tren)]_{2}(μ_{2}-Ge_{2}S_{6})	tren = N,N,N-tris(2-aminoethyl)amine	triclinic	P1̅	a 7.631 b 8.039 c 11.957, α 98.952° β 101.263° γ 109.696°				
[Mn^{II}(tepa)]_{2}(μ_{2}-Ge_{2}S_{6})	tepa= tetraethylenepentaamine	orthorhombic	I 4_{1}/a	a =25.770 b =25.770 c =9.812				
[Fe(2,2′-bipy)_{3}]_{2}[Ge_{4}S_{10}]·10H_{2}O		monoclinic	P2_{1}/c	a=23.8411 b=13.6462 c=22.9029 β=93.400° Z=4	7438.1	1.643		
{Fe(tepa)}_{2}(μ-Ge_{2}Se_{6})		tetragonal	I4_{1}/a					
K_{2}FeGe_{3}S_{8}		triclinic	P1̅	a = 7.016, b= 7.770, c = 14.342, α = 93.80°, β = 92.65°, γ = 114.04°				
K_{2}CoGe_{3}S_{8}		monoclinic	P2_{1}	a = 7.1089, b = 11.8823, c = 16.759, β = 96.604°				
[{Co(tepa)}_{2}(μ-Ge_{2}S_{6})]	tepa= tetraethylenepentaamine	tetragonal	I4_{1}/a					
[dienH_{2}][Co(dien)_{2}][Ge_{2}S_{6}]	dien = diethylenetriamine	triclinic	P1̅	a 11.3224 b 14.6492 c 18.3710, α 71.000° β 78.352° γ 73.441° Z=4	2741.5	1.715	yellow	
[dienH_{2}][Co(dien)_{2}][Ge_{2}S_{6}]		triclinic	P1̅	a 11.3224 b 14.6492 c 18.3710, α 71.000° β 78.352° γ 73.441° Z=1	679.62	1.730	yellow	
[dienH_{2}][Co(dien)_{2}][Ge_{2}S_{6}]		orthorhombic	Pbca	a=15.2110 b=16.7025 c=21.8821 Z=8	5559.4	1.692	yellow	
[dienH_{2}][Co(dien)_{2}][Ge_{2}S_{6}]		orthorhombic	Pca2_{1}	a=a=14.7043 b=9.0099 c=21.4540 Z=4	2842.3	1.655	yellow	
[Ni(cyclam)]_{3}[Ni(cyclam)(H_{2}O)_{2}][Ge_{4}S_{10}]_{2}·21H_{2}O	cyclam = 1,4,8,11-tetraazacyclotetradecane	monoclinic	Cc	a=35.915 b=10.047 c=30.607 β =115.32 Z=4	9983	1.778		
[Ni(en)_{3}]_{2}Ge_{2}S_{6}	en=ethylenediamine	orthorhombic	Pbca	a 15.56 b 11.226 c 18.07				
[Ni(dien)_{2}]_{3}[Ge_{3}Sb_{8}S_{21}]·0.5H_{2}O	dien = diethylenetriamine							
[Ni(trien)_{2}]_{2}Ge_{4}S_{10}	bis(bis(triethylenetetramine)-nickel) hexakis(μ_{2}-sulfido)-tetrasulfido-tetra-germanium	monoclinic	C2/c	a =21.618 b =10.957 c =22.719, β=111.224°				
[{Ni(tepa)}_{2}(μ-Ge_{2}S_{6})]	tetrakis(μ_{2}-sulfido)-disulfido-bis(tetraethylenepentamine)-di-germanium-di-nickel	orthorhombic	Pbca	a =15.151 b =13.083 c =15.255				
[Ni^{II}(dien)_{2}]_{2}(Ge_{2}S_{6})	dien = diethylenetriamine	monoclinic	P 2_{1}/n	a 10.093 b 14.219 c 11.703, β 91.631°				
[Ni^{II}(dien)_{2}](H_{2}pipe)(Ge_{2}S_{6})	pipe = piperazine	triclinic	P1̅	a 6.980 b 8.530 c 11.527, α 93.03° β 106.29° γ 101.95°				
[Ni^{II}(tepa)]_{2}(μ_{2}-Ge_{2}S_{6})	tepa = tetraethylenepentamine	orthorhombic	Pbca	a =15.147 b =13.0552 c =15.238				
[(CH_{3}CH_{2})_{4}N]_{3}CuGe_{4}S_{10}	catena-[hexakis(tetraethylammonium) hexadecakis(μ-sulfido)-tetrakis(sulfido)-octa-germanium-di-copper]	monoclinic	P 2_{1}/n	a 15.0956 b 14.2127 c =19.5889, β 91.131°				
[H_{4}teta]_{5}[Cu_{40}Ge_{15}S_{60}]·2.5(teta)								
Cu(AlS_{2})(GeS_{2})_{4}		monoclinic	P2_{1}/n	a 6.796 b 37.628 c 6.8797, β 119.52°				
Cu_{4}MnGe_{2}S_{7}		monoclinic	Cc	a=16.7443 b=6.47893 c=9.8060 β=93.188°				
Cu_{4}FeGe_{2}S_{7}		monoclinic	C2	a=11.7405 b=5.3589 c=8.3420 β=98.661°				
Cu_{4}CoGe_{2}S_{7}		monoclinic	C2	a=11.7280 b=5.3399 c=8.3313 β=98.668°				
Cu_{4}NiGe_{2}S_{7}		monoclinic	C2	a=11.703 b=5.333 c=8.311 β=98.37°				
Sr_{2}CoGe_{2}OS_{6}		tetrahedral	P4̅2_{1}m	a=9.4056 c=6.1741 Z=2	546.19	3.574	dark green; oxysulfide	
Y_{3}LiGeS_{7}								
[Y_{2}(tepa)_{2}(μ-OH)_{2}(μ-Ge_{2}S_{6})](tepa)_{0.5}·H_{2}O		monoclinic	C2/c	a=19.638 b=14.415 c=16.910 β=122.47 Z=4	4038.6	1.863	colourless	
KYGeS_{4}								
[{R^{N}Ge(μ-S)_{3}}_{4}Pd_{6}]·MeOH	R^{N} = CMe_{2}CH_{2}CMeNNH_{2}							
Ag_{10}Ge_{3}S_{11}		monoclinic	Cc	a = 2.6244 b = 0.65020 c = 2.5083 β = 109.910°				
[(CH_{3}CH_{2})_{4}N]_{3}AgGe_{4}S_{10}	catena-[hexakis(tetraethylammonium) hexadecakis(μ-sulfido)-tetrakis(sulfido)-di-silver-octa-germanium]	monoclinic	P 2_{1}/n	a 15.1898 b 14.3043 c 19.5059, β 91.056°				
Ag(AlS_{2})(GeS_{2})_{4}		monoclinic	P2_{1}/n	a 6.799 b 38.4169 c 6.813 β 119.65°				
Li_{4}CdGe_{2}S_{7}		monoclinic	Cc	a=17.4432 b=6.9353 c=10.3271 β=93.9042°				
Na_{4}CdGe_{2}S_{7}		monoclinic	P2_{1}/c	a=7.0813 b=11.9007 c=15.5759 β=90.791°				
Y_{3}Cd_{0.5}GeS_{7}								
Ag_{4}SnGe_{2}S_{7}		monoclinic	Cc	a=11.3398 b=6.9706 c=15.4885 β=91.213°			yellow; _{∞}[SnGe_{2}S_{8}]^{6–} chains	
Na_{9}Sb(Ge_{2}S_{6})_{2}		monoclinic	C2/m	a=7.5857 b=11.574 c=6.817 β=106.587 Z=1	573.7	2.905	yellow	
[Ge(en)_{3}][GeSb_{2}S_{6}]		orthorhombic	Pbca					
[(Me)_{2}NH_{2}]_{6}[Ge_{2}Sb_{2}S_{7}][Ge_{4}S_{10}]		triclinic	P1̅				microporous, can exchange dimethyl ammonium for alkalis	
[dabcoH]_{2}[Ge_{2}Sb_{3}S_{10}]	dabco = 1,4-diazabicyclo[2.2.2]octane							
DMAH[dabcoH]_{2}[Ge_{2}Sb_{3}S_{10}]	dabco = 1,4-diazabicyclo[2.2.2]octane	monoclinic	C2					
[DMAH]_{2}GeSb_{3}S_{6}			P4_{1}2_{1}2					
[AEPH_{2}][GeSb_{2}S_{6}]·CH_{3}OH	AEP = N-(2-aminoethyl)piperazine	orthorhombic	Pbca	a=6.7183 b=18.3065 c=31.5007 Z=8	3874.2	2.303	yellow	
[CH_{3}NH_{3}]_{20}Ge_{10}Sb_{28}S_{72}·7H_{2}O		monoclinic	C2/c	a =29.2964 b=29.3261 c=41.601 β=100.084°				
[(CH_{3}CH_{2}CH_{2})_{2}NH_{2}]_{3}Ge_{3}Sb_{5}S_{15}·0.5(C_{2}H_{5}OH)		triclinic	P1̅	a=9.7628 b=15.7590 c=17.0313, α=79.868° β=75.010° γ=81.094°				
[Mn(en)_{3}][GeSb_{2}S_{6}]	dien = diethylenetriamine	orthorhombic	Pbca	a=13.374 b=17.607 c=18.562 Z=8	4370.8	2.26	yellow	
[Co(en)_{3}][GeSb_{2}S_{6}]		orthorhombic	Pbca					
[Co(dien)_{2}]_{2}[GeSb_{4}S_{10}]	dien = diethylenetriamine	orthorhombic	Pbca	a=14.684 b=17.133 c=33.478 Z=8	8422	2.205	yellow	
[Ni(en)_{3}][GeSb_{2}S_{6}]		orthorhombic	Pbca					
[Ni(dien)_{2}]_{3}[Ge_{3}Sb_{8}S_{21}]·0.5H_{2}O		monoclinic	C2/m	a =17.604 b =30.660 c =15.348 β =114.69°				
La(dien)_{2}(μ–η^{1},η^{2}-GeS_{3}(SH))		monoclinic	C2/c	a=27.837 b=16.993 c=8.318 β =103.96 Z=8	3818.7	1.903	red	
KLaGeS_{4}		monoclinic	P2_{1}	a=6.6645 b=6.7079 c=8.7248 β=107.519° Z=2	371.95		SHG 1.2×AgGaS_{2}; band gap 3.34 eV; birefringence 0.098 @ 1064 nm	
Nd(dien)_{2}(μ–η^{1},η^{2}-GeS_{3}(SH))		monoclinic	C2/c	a=27.694 b=16.845 c=8.287 β =103.791 Z=8	3754.4	1.955	red	
[Pr(dien)_{3}]_{2}[Ge_{2}S_{6}]Cl_{2}	dien = diethylenetriamine	monoclinic	P2_{1}/n	a=11.637 b=14.143 c=15.120 β=98.149° Z=4	2463	1.765	green	
[Sm(dien)_{3}]_{2}[Ge_{2}S_{6}]Cl_{2}	dien = diethylenetriamine	monoclinic	P2_{1}/n	11.532 b=14.423 c=14.573 β=97.105° Z=4	2405	1.834	light yellow	
Sm_{3}Zn_{0.5}GeS_{7}								
Eu_{3}Ge_{3}S_{9}				a=8.468 b=11.76 c=8.389 α=90.49° β=104.56° γ=69.53° Z=2		4.22 meas		
[Eu(dien)_{3}]_{2}[Ge_{2}S_{6}]Cl_{2}	dien = diethylenetriamine	monoclinic	P2_{1}/n	a=11.567 b=14.633 c=14.465 β=96.434 Z=4	2432.9	1.818	yellow	
Gd_{3}Cd_{0.5}GeS_{7}								
[Gd(dien)_{3}]_{2}[Ge_{2}S_{6}]Cl_{2}	dien = diethylenetriamine	monoclinic	P2_{1}/n	11.548 b=14.677 c=14.427 β=96.332° Z=4	2430.4	1.834	colourless	
[Dy(dien)_{3}]_{2}[Ge_{2}S_{6}]Cl_{2}	dien = diethylenetriamine	monoclinic	P2_{1}/n	a=11.503 b=14.645 c=14.340 β=96.178° Z=4	2401.8	1.870	light yellow	
[Ho(trien)(en)GeS_{3}(SH)]	trien = triethylenetetramine							
Er_{2}(tepa)_{2}(μ-OH)_{2}(μ-Ge_{2}S_{6})]_{n}·nH_{2}O	tepa = tetraethylenepentamine							
[Er_{2}(dien)_{4}(μ-OH)_{2}][Ge_{2}S_{6}]	dien = diethylenetriamine	monoclinic	P2_{1}/n	11.710 b=11.318 c=13.548 β=97.635° Z=4	1779.6	2.088	red	
Tm_{2}(tepa)_{2}(μ-OH)_{2}(μ-Ge_{2}S_{6})]_{n}·nH_{2}O	tepa = tetraethylenepentamine							
Li_{4}HgGe_{2}S_{7}		monoclinic	Cc	a=16.876 b=6.7764 c=10.161 β=93.360°				
Ag_{4}HgGe_{2}S_{7}		monoclinic	Cc	a=17.4546 b=6.8093 c=10.5342 β=93.3980°				
[(Me)_{2}NH_{2}][BiGeS_{4}]		monoclinic	P2_{1}	a=6.7290 b c=10.6748 β=105.789 Z=2	479.72	3.156	red	
