= Tellurogermanate =

Tellurogermanates or telluridogermanates are compounds with anions with tellurium bound to germanium. They are analogous with germanates, thiogermanates and selenidogermanates.

== Properties ==
Most tellurogermanates are coloured black. They are semiconductors with a small band gap.

Ge_{4}Te_{10}^{4−} forms an adamantane structure.

== List ==
		crystal system	space group	cell dimensions	volume	density		ref
(Et_{4}N)_{4}Ge_{4}Te_{10}		cubic	P4̅3m	a 22.923			black	
Na_{6}Ge_{2}Te_{6}		monoclinic	P2_{1}/c	a=8.899 b=12.946 c=8.908 β =119.87°				
K_{2}GeTe_{4}		monoclinic	P2_{1}/c	a = 12.703 b = 8.680 c = 9.829 β = 104.8°				
K_{4}Ge_{4}Te_{10}								
K_{6}Ge_{2}Te_{6}		monoclinic	C2/c					
[K_{4}(H_{2}O)_{2}][GeTe_{4}]		monoclinic	C2/c	a 19.43 b 7.4133 c 13.845 β 129.93°				
Cr_{2}Ge_{2}Te_{6}		rhombohedral	P3_{1}2	a=6.8275 c=20.5619 V=0 Z=3	830	6.091	dark grey; ferromagnetic < 63K	
[Mn(en)_{3}]_{2}(Ge_{5}Te_{10})		orthorhombic	P2_{1}2_{1}2	a 10.735 b 23.417 c 8.932				
(Me_{4}N)_{2}Mn[Ge_{4}Te_{10}]			I4̅				band gap 0.69 eV	
Na_{9}Sb[Ge_{2}Te_{6}]_{2}		monoclinic	C2/c	a = 9.541 b = 26.253 c = 7.582β = 122.23° Z = 2			dark grey; band gap 1.51 eV	
Cs_{2}GeTe_{4}	848.8	orthorhombic	Pnma	a=12.602 b=11.501 c=7.694 Z=4	1113.8	5.06		
Cs_{6}Ge_{2}Te_{6}		monoclinic	C2/c	a = 17.027 b = 14.237 c = 10.104 β = 96.701° Z = 4			black; Ge-Ge bond	
Cs_{2}Ge_{3}Ga_{6}Te_{14}			P3m1̅	a = 8.2475 c = 14.2734 Z = 1	840.82			
Cs_{2}Ge_{3}In_{6}Te_{14}			P3m1̅	a =8.5404 c = 14.6766 Z = 1	927.07			
β-BaGa_{2}Te_{4}		orthorhombic	Imma	a = 23.813 b = 11.967 c = 6.7215				
Ba_{2}GeTe_{3}		orthorhombic	Pnma	a = 6.790 b = 23.720 c = 6.930				
Ba_{2}Ge_{2}Te_{5}		orthorhombic	Pna2_{1}	a= 13.3879 b= 9.1703 c= 9.9441 Z= 4			black	
Ba_{5}Ga_{2}Ge_{3}Te_{12}		monoclinic	P2_{1}/c	a = 13.6540 b = 9.6705 c = 23.1134				
Ba_{6}In_{2}Ge_{2}Te_{15}		monoclinic	P2_{1}/c	a 9.6201 b 13.4225 c 27.585 β 92.469°				
Ba_{4}Ge_{2}Sb_{2}Te_{10}		monoclinic	P2_{1}/c	a = 13.984 b = 13.472 c = 13.569 β = 90.16° Z=4			black	
Tl_{2}GeTe_{3}		orthorhombic	Pnma	a = 8.303 b = 21.514 c = 8.453 Z = 8			black	
Tl_{2}GeTe_{5}								
