= Selenidostannate =

Class of chemical compounds

Selenidostannates are chemical compounds which contain anionic units of selenium connected to tin. They can be considered as stannates where selenium substitutes for oxygen. Similar compounds include the selenogermanates and thiostannates. They are in the category of chalcogenidotetrelates or more broadly chalcogenometallates.

== Formation ==
Some selenidostannates can be made by treating tin diselenide (SnSe_{2}) with an alkali selenide dissolved in water. Other possible solvents include choline chloride with 1,8-diaminooctane,

== Properties ==
Most selenidostannates are semiconductors. Their resistance drops on exposure to light. Also selenidostannates are often coloured, most often orange, red or yellow.

Many are unstable in humid air, as the water reacts with the selenidostannate to form hydrogen selenide (H_{2}Se).

== Use ==
Selenidostannates are primarily of research interest. They are under investigation as photoelectric materials.

== List ==
name	chem	mw	crystal system	space group	unit cell Å	volume	density	comment	references
tris(μ_{2}-1,2-Diaminoethane)-1,2-diaminoethane-di-lithium triselenido-tin(iv)	Li_{4}Sn_{2}Se_{6} · 8en		monoclinic	C2/c	a=22.660 b=9.449 c=20.336 β=101.24°				
diammonium	[NH_{4}]_{2}Sn_{4}Se_{9}		orthorhombic	Pnma	a =13.2274 b=12.4270 c=12.6102			supertetrahedra Sn_{4}Se_{10} arranged in layers	
bis(dimethylammonium) heptakis(μ-selenido)-tri-tin dimethylamine solvate	[NH_{2}(CH_{3})_{2}]_{2}Sn_{3}Se_{7}·0.5NH(CH_{3})_{2}		monoclinic	C2/c	a=23.5939 b=13.6409 c=15.0372, β=102.177°			chains of Sn_{3}Se_{8}	
tetrakis(ethylammonium) tetradecakis(μ-selenido)-hexa-tin	[NH_{3}C_{2}H_{5}]_{2}Sn_{3}Se_{7}		orthorhombic	Cmca	a=13.5561 b=24.0194 c=27.0184				
bis(Ethylenediammonium) ethylenediamine bis((μ_{2}-selenido)-diseleno-tin(iv))	[enH_{2}]_{2}[Sn_{2}Se_{6}] · en		triclinic	P1̅	a =8.636 b =11.044 c =6.613, α =104.48° β =110.76° γ =79.43°			twin edge-bridged SnSe_{4} tetrahedra	
tetrakis(2-Aminoethylammonium) bis(μ_{2}-selenido)-tetraselenido-di-tin(iv) 1,2-diaminoethane	[enH]_{4}[Sn^{IV}_{2}Se_{6}] · en		triclinic	P1̅	a=11.212 b=11.631 c=13.097, α=79.40° β=76.82° γ=64.82°				
catena(Ethylenediammonium hemiethylenediamine (μ_{3}-selenido)-hexakis(μ_{2}-selenido)-tri-tin(iv))	[enH_{2}][Sn_{3}Se_{7}]·0.5en		orthorhombic	Fdd2	a=23.597 b=27.563 c=13.877				
catena-(tetrakis(μ_{2}-Seleno)-ethylenediamine-di-tin(iv))	[2 SnSe_{2}·en]		orthorhombic	Pca2_{1}	a 1=3.724 b =11.866 c =13.647				
	[(C_{2}H_{5})_{3}NH]_{2}Sn_{3}Se_{7}			P2_{1}2_{1}2_{1}				2.12 eV	
	[(C_{2}H_{5})_{3}NH]_{2}Sn_{3}Se_{7}·0.25H_{2}O		monoclinic	P2_{1}/n				2.1 eV	
	(Et_{4}N)_{2}Sn_{3}Se_{7}		monoclinic	P2_{1}/m	a=10.140 b=13.858 c=12.071, β=100.649°				
	[NEt_{4}]_{4}[Sn_{4}Se_{10}]		cubic	P4̅3n	a = 22.170	10897			
bis(tetrapropylammonium) nonaselenidotetrastannate(IV)	([C_{3}H_{7}]_{4}N)_{2}[Sn_{4}Se_{9}]		monoclinic	P2_{1}/n	a = 15.328, b = 19.058, c = 15.398, β = 97.947°, Z = 4	4454.7		orange	
	(C_{7}N_{4}OH_{16})_{2}Sn_{3}Se_{7}·H_{2}		orthorhombic	Pbca					
	(NH_{3}(CH_{2})_{8}NH_{3})Sn_{3}Se_{7}		triclinic	P1̅					
Octane-1,8-diammonium (μ_{3}-selena)-hexakis(μ_{2}-selena)-tri-tin	(NH_{3}(CH_{2})_{8}NH_{3})Sn_{3}Se_{7}		triclinic	P1̅	a=8.4419 b=11.6441 c=13.1857 α=66.636° β=77.989° γ=83.919°				
Decane-1,10-diammonium (μ_{3}-selena)-hexakis(μ_{2}-selena)-tri-tin	(NH_{3}(CH_{2})_{10}NH_{3})Sn_{3}Se_{7}		monoclinic	C2/c	a=23.726 b=13.910 c=15.954 β=111.915°				
	(NH_{3}(CH_{2})_{10}NH_{3})Sn_{3}Se_{7}		monoclinic	C2/c					
tetrakis(1,2-dimethyl-3-propyl-1H-imidazol-3-ium) bis(μ_{3}-selenido)-octadecakis(μ_{2}-selenido)-nona-tin			monoclinic	P2_{1}/c	a =18.652 b=20.353 c=20.196 β=105.244°				
tetrakis(1,2-dimethyl-3-propyl-1H-imidazol-3-ium) dodecakis(μ_{2}-selenido)-diselenido-hexa-tin	[Mmpmim]_{4}Sn_{6}Se_{14}		monoclinic	P2_{1}/c	a=14.270 b=15.549 c=14.377 β=92.749°				
bis(1,2-dimethyl-3-propyl-1H-imidazol-3-ium) (μ_{3}-selenido)-hexakis(μ_{2}-selenido)-tri-tin	[Mmpmim]_{2}Sn_{3}Se_{7}		trigonal	P3_{2}21	a=13.9470 b=13.9470 c=27.8553				
octakis(1,2-dimethyl-3-butyl-1H-imidazol-3-ium) tetrakis(μ_{3}-selenido)-docosakis(μ_{2}-selenido)-diselenido-dodeca-tin	[Mmpmim]_{8}Sn_{12}Se_{26}		monoclinic	P2_{1}/c	a=24.538 b=13.961 c=19.434 β=94.539°				
tetra(1,2-dimethyl-3-butyl-1H-imidazol-3-ium) bis(μ_{3}-selenido)-dodecakis(μ_{2}-selenido)-hexa-tin	[Mmbmim]_{4}Sn_{6}Se_{14}		trigonal	P3_{2}21	a=13.9381 c=27.774				
	[prmmim]_{2}[Sn_{3}Se_{7}]			P322_{1}					
Bmmim=1-butyl-2,3-dimethylimidazolium	[bmmim]_{2}[Sn_{3}Se_{7}]			P322_{1}				band gap 2.2 eV	
Bzmim = 1-benzyl-3-methylimidazolium bis(1-benzyl-3-methylimidazolium) heptakis(μ-selenido)-tri-tin	[Bzmim]_{2}[Sn_{3}Se_{7}]		orthorhombic	Pbca	a=14.297 b=13.8808 c=16.8855 β=99.817°				
Emim = 1-ethyl-3-methylimidazolium pentakis(1-ethyl-3-methylimidazolium) bis(heptakis(μ-selenido)-tri-tin) chloride unknown solvate	[Emim]_{5}[Sn_{3}Se_{7}]_{2}Cl		hexagonal	P6_{3}/mmc	a=13.8331 c=18.4649				
	[DBNH]_{2}[Sn_{3}Se_{7}]·PEG		monoclinic	C2/c				band gap 2.13 eV	
	[DBNH]_{3}[NH_{4}][Sn_{6}Se_{14}]		trigonal	R3̅				band gap 2.02 eV	
	(H^{+}-DBN)_{2}[Sn_{3}Se_{7}]			Cmc2_{1}				band gap 2.02 eV	
	(CH_{3})_{3}N(CH_{2})_{2}OH]_{2}[Sn_{3}Se_{7}]		orthorhombic	Pbca				band gap 2.35 eV	
catena-[bis(2-hydroxy-N,N,N-trimethylethan-1-aminium) heptakis(μ-selenido)-tri-tin monohydrate]	(CH_{3})_{3}N(CH_{2})_{2}OH]_{2}[Sn_{3}Se_{7}]∙H_{2}O		monoclinic	P2_{1}/n	a=9.8365 b=13.5796 c=20.7384 β=92.727° Z=4	2893.0	2.606	orange;	
catena-[bis(N,N,N-trimethylpropan-1-aminium) heptakis(μ-selenido)-tri-tin]	(CH_{3})_{3}N(CH_{2})_{2}CH_{3}]_{2}[Sn_{3}Se_{7}]		orthorhombic	Pbca	a =17.534 b =13.7273 c =24.1221 Z=8	5806.2	2.547	orange	
bis(N,N,N-trimethylbutanaminium) poly[heptaselenidotristannate(IV)]	(Bu(CH_{3})_{3}N)_{2}[Sn_{3}Se_{7}]		monoclinic	C2/c	a = 23.950, b = 13.760, c = 20.011, β = 114.565°, Z = 8	5998		orange	
AEPP = N-aminoethylpiperazine	[AEPPH_{2}]_{2}[Sn_{5}Se_{12}]		triclinic	P1̅	a = 10.6351, b = 10.6850, c = 10.7771, α = 61.344°, β = 62.442°, γ = 67.468				
phen=1,10-Phenanthroline	(CH_{3}NH_{3})_{4}(Sn_{2}Se_{6})·6phen		triclinic	P1̅	a 10.594 b 12.225 c 14.945 α 83.589° β 83.133° γ 86.604°				
Im=imidazolium catena-(pentakis(3-n-butyl-1-methylimidazolium) dodecakis(μ-selenido)-nona-tin tetrafluoroborate)	(C_{4}C_{1}C_{1}Im)_{5}[Sn_{9}Se_{20}][BF_{4}]		monoclinic	P2_{1}/n	a=13.878 b=20.365 c=31.026 β =91.326° Z=4	8766	2.652	orange	
DMMP=2,6-dimethylmorpholine	(DMMPH)_{4}[Sn_{2}Se_{6}]		monoclinic	P2_{1}/n	a=6.158 b=22.381 c=14.642 β=93.57° Z=2	2014.1	1.926	yellow	
catena-(bis(1-ethyl-3-methylimidazolium) bis(2,6-dimethylmorpholin-4-ium) tetradecakis(μ-selenido)-hexa-tin)	(C_{2}C_{1}Im)_{2}(DMMPH)_{2}[Sn_{6}Se_{14}]		monoclinic	P2_{1}/n	a=20.616 b=13.857 c=19.629 β=107.40° Z=4	5351	2.821	orange	
catena-[tetrakis(3-n-Butyl-1,2-dimethyl-1H-imidazol-3-ium) bis(μ_{3}-selenido)-undecakis(μ_{2}-selenido)-selenido-hexa-tin(iv)]	[BMMIm]_{4}[Sn_{6}Se_{14}]		monoclinic	P2_{1}/c	a 24.2744 b 13.8901 c 19.1763 β 94.083° Z=4	6449.3	2.503	orange	
catena-(hexadecakis(1-butyl-2,3-dimethylimidazolium) octakis(μ_{3}-selenido)-octatetracontakis(μ_{2}-selenido)-tetracosa-tin)	[BMMIm]_{16}[Sn_{24}Se_{56}]		trigonal	P3_{2}	a=27.8622 c=28.0566 Z=3	18862.4	2.568	red	
catena-(tris(3-Butyl-1,2-dimethylimidazolium) 2,6-dimethylmorpholin-4-ium (μ_{3}-selenido)-dodecakis(μ_{2}-selenido)-selenido-hexa-tin)	[BMMIm]_{3}[DMMPH][Sn_{6}Se_{14}]		triclinic	P1̅	a 11.1358 b 12.6745 c 23.362, α 89.690° β 88.473° γ 72.098° Z=2	3136.6	2.534	orange or yellow (low temp)	
1-butyl-3-methyl-inidazolinium	[BMIm]_{4}[Sn_{9}Se_{20}]		monoclinic	Cc	a=19.901 b=26.494 c=14.447 β=105.34 Z=4	7361	2.892	red	
catena-[bis(2-hydroxy-N,N,N-trimethylethan-1-aminium) heptakis(μ-selenido)-tri-tin monohydrate]	[HOCH_{2}CH_{2}N(CH_{3})_{3}]_{2}Sn_{3}Se_{7}·H_{2}O		monoclinic	P2_{1}/n	a 9.8365 b 13.5796 c 20.7384 β 92.727°			orange (high temp) or yellow	
catena-[bis(N,N,N-trimethylpropan-1-aminium) heptakis(μ-selenido)-tri-tin]	[CH_{3}CH_{2}CH_{2}N(CH_{3})_{3}]_{2}Sn_{3}Se_{7}		orthorhombic	Pbca	a 17.403 b 13.7025 c 23.9113		2.852	yellow	
tetrakis(piperidinium) bis(μ-selenido)-tetraselenido-di-tin	{[Sn_{2}Se_{6}]·4(C_{5}NH_{12})}		monoclinic	P2_{1}/n	a 10.3277 b 10.2808 c 15.7823 β 96.725°		2.0110	red	
catena-[bis(3,6,7,8-tetrahydro-2H-pyrrolo[1,2-a]pyrimidin-5-ium) tetrakis(μ-selenido)-hexa-tin]	{[Sn_{3}Se_{7}]·2(HDBN)} DBN = 1,5-diazabicyclo[4.3.0]non-5-ene		orthorhombic	Cmc2_{1}	a 13.4435 b 24.4817 c 14.4494			red	
	[dabcoH]_{2}[(CH_{3})_{2}NH_{2}]_{2}[Sn_{2}Se_{6}]		monoclinic	C2/m	a=20.172 b=11.674 c=6.476 β=103.15 Z=2	1485.2	2.303	yellow	
	(N_{2}H_{4})_{3}(N_{2}H_{5})_{4}Sn_{2}Se_{6}		triclinic	P1̅	a = 6.6475, b = 9.5474, c = 9.883, α = 94.110°, β = 99.429°, γ = 104.141°, Z = 1				
bis(1-Aminoethylammonium) bis(4,7,13,16,21,24-hexaoxa-1,10-diazabicyclo(8.8.8)hexacosane-potassium) bis(μ_{2}-seleno)-tetraseleno-di-tin(iv)	(enH)_{2}(2,2,2-crypt-K)_{2}Sn_{2}Se_{6}		monoclinic	P2_{1}/n	a=8.442 b=25.877 c=14.821 β=104.19°				
	(MeSn)_{4}Se_{6}		triclinic	P1̅	a = 9.147, b =10.495 c =10.508, α = 85.60, β = 89.83 γ =65.71° Z=2	916		adamantane structure	
	Na_{4}SnS_{4}		tetragonal	I4_{1}acd					
	Na_{4}SnS_{4}		tetragonal	P4̅2_{1}c	a=7.84679 c=6.95798, Z=2	428.42		yellow	
	Na_{4}SnSe_{4}·14H_{2}O								
	Na_{4}SnSe_{4}·16H_{2}O		monoclinic	P2_{1}/m	a = 8.673, b = 16.563, c = 8.647, β = 92.10°, Z = 2			tetrahedra; Sn-Se bond length 2.504−2.527 Å	
	Na_{4}Sn_{2}S_{6}·5H_{2}O								
	Na_{4}Sn_{2}Se_{6}·13H_{2}O		triclinic	P1̅	a = 7.106, b = 10.330, c = 19.009, α = 78.60, β = 85.66, γ = 72.85° Z = 2 (at −130 °C)			orange-red; tetrahedral edge-shared pairs	
	Na_{4}Ge_{2}Se_{6} · 16 H_{2}O		monoclinic	P2_{1}/c	a = 9.894, b = 11.781, c = 12.225, β = 92.90°, Z = 2				
	Na_{4}Sn_{3}Se_{8}							trigonal bipyramid + tetrahedron	
	Na_{6}Sn_{4}Se_{11} · 22 H_{2}O		monoclinic	C2/c	a 15.325 b 11.634 c 26.739 β 95.81°			yellow-orange	
	Na_{6}Sn_{2}Se_{7}·16H_{2}O							red	
catena-(tris(1-Amino-2-ammonioethane) octakis(μ_{3}-selenido)-hexakis(μ_{2}-selenido)-sodium-hexa-tin sesquikis(dimethylamine) sesquihydrate)	(enH)_{3}Na[Sn_{3}Se_{7}]_{2}·1.5Me_{2}NH·1.5H_{2}O			R32	a=13.8647 c=18.962			Na^{+} ion conductor	
bis((μ_{4}-Selenido)-(μ_{3}-selenido)-bis(μ_{2}-ethylene-1,2-diamine))-tetra-sodium-tin	[Na_{4}(en)_{4}][SnSe_{4}]		orthorhombic	P4_{1}2_{1}2	a=13.090 b=13.090 c=14.548				
	Li_{2}MgNaSe_{4}		orthorhombic	Pmn2_{1}	a = 8.40 b = 7.18 c = 6.73 Z=2	405.9	3.867	yellow; moisture absorbing	
	SnPSe_{3}		monoclinic	Pn	a=6.8161 b=7.7264 c=9.6437 β=91.073°				
	K_{4}SnSe_{4}		orthorhombic	Pnma	a=14.714 b=10.323 c=8.248 Z=4			yellow	
	2D-K_{2}Sn_{2}Se_{5}		orthorhombic	Pbca	a=13.0246 b=12.186 c=14.135 Z=8				
	K_{2}[Sn_{3}Se_{7}]		hexagonal	P6_{5}22	a=13.8325 c=43.295			red	
	K_{4}Sn_{2}Se_{6}							tetrahedral edge-shared pairs	
	K_{4}Sn_{3}Se_{8}		orthorhombic	Ccca	a 8.214 b 27.795 c 8.2136				
	K_{0.5}[Sn_{3}Se_{7}]		hexagonal	P6_{5}22	a=13.8325 c 43.295 Z=12	7174.1	2.579	red	
	K_{6}Sn_{4}Se_{11} . 8H_{2}O		monoclinic	C2/c	a =28.004 b =9 c =15.192, β 113.8°				
	K_{6}[Sn^{III}_{2}Se_{6}]								
	K_{4}Sn_{4}Se_{10}·4.5H_{2}O		trigonal	R3̅	a=15.32 c=21.019				
tetrakis(Tetramethylammonium) (hexakis(μ_{2}-seleno)-di-tin(iv)-potassium)	K(N(CH_{3})_{4})_{3}Sn_{2}Se_{6}		triclinic	P1̅	a 9.587 b 10.005 c 15.996 α 95.15° β 92.81° γ 106.96°				
(μ_{2}-Ethylene-1,2-diamine-N,N')-bis(ethylene-1,2-diamine-N)-bis(1,4,7,10,13,16-hexaoxacyclo-octadecane)-di-potassium (μ_{2}-ethylene-1,2-diamine-N,N')-(ethylene-1,2-diamine-N)-bis(1,4,7,10,13,16-hexaoxacyclo-octadecane)-di-potassium hexakis(μ_{2}-selenido)-(tetraselenoxy)-tetra-tin(iv)	[18-crown-6-K]_{4}[Sn_{4}Se_{10}]·5en		monoclinic	P2_{1}/n	a=22.003 b=18.966 c=24.392 β=97.548°				
dipotassium(+) bis[(1,4,7,10,13,16-hexaoxacyclooctadecane)potassium(+)] hexaselenodistannate(4-) tetrakis(ethylenediamine) solvate (18-crown-6)	K_{2}[K(C_{12}H_{24}O_{6})]_{2}[Sn_{2}Se_{6}].4C_{2}H_{8}N_{2}		monoclinic	P2_{1}/n	a=15.634 b=8.479 c=23.404 β=108.60°				
bis((4,7,13,16,21,24-Hexaoxa-1,10-diazabicyclo(8.8.8)hexacosane)-potassium) tris(tetraselenido)-tin(iv)	[K-(2,2,2-crypt)]_{2}Sn(Se_{4})_{3}		triclinic	P1̅	a=10.7088 b=12.9986 c=21.7865 α=86.299° β=81.598° γ=87.258°				
	Ca(en)_{4}Ca(en)_{3}[Sn_{2}Se_{6}]		triclinic	P1̅	a = 10.2708, b = 12.2739, c = 16.3103, α = 93.576°, β = 90.609°, γ = 109.269°, Z = 1	1936.09			
	[V^{II}(dien)_{2}]_{2}[Sn_{2}Se_{6}]		monoclinic	P2_{1}/n	a 9.7686 b 15.094 c 12.517 β 91.007°			band gap 2.11 eV	
catena-(tetraethylenepentaminedi-ium octakis(μ-selenido)-bis(tetraethylenepentamine)-tetraselenolato-tetra-tin(iv)-di-vanadium(iii))	[H_{2}tepa]_{0.5}[V^{III}(tepa)(μ-Sn_{2}Se_{6})]		orthorhombic	Abm2	a=7.808 b=41.97 c=16.982 Z=8	5565	2.496		
tepa = tetraethylenepentamine bis(Hydroxy-tetraethylenepentamine-chromium) 1,3,2,4-diselenadistannetane-2,2,4,4-tetrakis(selenolate) monohydrate	[Cr(tepa)(OH)]_{2}Sn_{2}Se_{6}·H_{2}O		orthorhombic	Pbcn	a=16.767 b=14.552 c=14.859			2.08 eV	
peha = pentaethylenehexamide bis(Pentaethylenehexamine-chromium) dichloride 1,3,2,4-diselenadistannetane-2,2,4,4-tetrakis(selenolate)	[Cr(peha)]_{2}(Sn_{2}Se_{6})Cl_{2}		monoclinic	P2_{1}/n	a=9.636 b=14.361 c=15.357 β=106.50°			2.19 eV	
en = ethylenediamine, pip = piperazine pentakis(tris(ethylenediamine)-chromium(iii)) bis(tetrakis(selenyl)-tin(iv)) heptakis(chloride) piperazine solvate	[Cr(en)_{3}]_{2.5}[SnSe_{4}]·Cl_{3.5}·(pip)_{0.5}·1.5H_{2}O		trigonal	R3̅c	a=15.4035 c =61.487			band gap 2.23 eV;SnSe_{4} tetrahedron	
catena-[(μ_{3}-Selenido)-(μ_{2}-selenido)-bis(1,2-diaminoethane)-selenido-manganese-tin]	SnSe_{3}Mn(en)_{2}		monoclinic	P2_{1}/n	a =9.4565 b =11.2896 c =12.7937 β =103.765° Z=4		2.657	red	
catena-[(μ_{3}-Selenido)-bis(μ_{2}-selenido)-(1,2-diaminoethane)-manganese-tin]	SnSe_{3}Mn(en)		orthorhombic	Pbca	a=13.9290 b=7.5261 c=19.2572 Z=8	2018.7	3.097	red	
catena-[bis(μ_{3}-Selenido)-bis(μ_{2}-selenido)-bis(1,2-diaminoethane)-di-manganese-tin]	MnSnSe_{4}Mn(en)_{2}		orthorhombic	Pnma	a=13.1101 b=14.8267 c=7.9466 Z=4	1544.66	2.858	yellow	
pentaehtylenehexaamine	[Mn(peha)][Sn_{3}Se_{7}]		monoclinic	P2_{1}/n					
	[Mn(dien)_{2}]Sn_{3}Se_{7}·0.5H_{2}O		monoclinic	P2_{1}/n				band gap 1.89 eV	
	[Mn(en)_{2.5}(en-Me)_{0.5}][Sn_{3}Se_{7}]		monoclinic	P2_{1}/c					
catena-[tris(ethane-1,2-diamine)-manganese heptakis(μ-selenido)-tri-tin]	[Mn(en)_{3}][Sn_{3}Se_{7}]		monoclinic	P2_{1}/n	a=12.2277 b=13.1904 c=15.9272 β=100.174°			red	
catena-[bis(N-(2-(amino)ethyl)ethane-1,2-diamine)-manganese heptakis(μ-selenido)-tri-tin monohydrate]	[Mn(dien)_{2}][Sn_{3}Se_{7}]∙H_{2}O		monoclinic	P2_{1}/n	a=12.3987 b=13.3150 c=16.6672 β=96.378°			red; band gap 2.04 eV	
	[Mn(dien)_{2}]Sn_{3}Se_{7}·0.5H_{2}O		monoclinic	P2_{1}/n	a 12.322 b 13.300 c 16.706 β 96.331°				
bis(bis(N-(2-(amino)ethyl)ethane-1,2-diamine)-manganese) bis(μ-selenido)-tetrakis(selenido)-di-tin	[Mn(dien)_{2}]_{2}Sn_{2}Se_{6}		monoclinic	P2_{1}/n	a 12.677 b 9.585 c 15.595 β 102.49(3)°				
	[Mn(dien)_{2}]MnSnSe_{4}		orthorhombic	C222_{1}	a=9.002 b=17.761 c=12.967			band gap 2.25 eV	
catena-[tris(ethane-1,2-diamine)-manganese(ii) (μ-diselenido)-hexakis(μ-selenido)-tri-tin]	[Mn(en)_{3}]Sn_{3}Se_{6}(Se_{2})		monoclinic	P2_{1}/n	a 11.974 b 14.046 c 15.893, β 99.78°				
catena-((bis(diethylenetriamine)-manganese(ii)) bis(μ-selenido)-manganese)	[Mn(en)_{3}][Sn(Se_{4})_{3}]		triclinic	P1̅	a 10.222 b 12.175 c 12.394, α 89.37° β 74.97° γ 75.66°				
en = ethylenediamine, hda = N-(2-hydroxyethyl)ethylenediamine) bis(bis(ethylenediamine)-(N-(2-hydroxyethyl)ethylenediamine)-manganese(ii)) bis(μ-selenido)-tetrakis(selenido)-di-tin	[Mn(en)_{2}(hda)]_{2}[Sn_{2}Se_{6}]		monoclinic	P2_{1}/n	a 9.1189 b 12.3968 c 17.515 β 97.010°				
catena-[bis(N-(2-hydroxyethyl)ethylenediamine)-manganese(ii) bis(μ-selenido)-manganese bis(μ-selenido)-tin]	[Mn(hda)_{2}][SnMnSe_{4}]		monoclinic	C2/c	a 9.4497 b 17.6025 c 13.1121 β 103.617°				
dien = diethylenetriamine catena-[bis(diethylenetriamine)-manganese(ii) bis(μ-selenido)-manganese bis(μ-selenido)-tin]	[Mn(dien)_{2}][SnMnSe_{4}]		orthorhombic	C222_{1}	a 9.0169 b 17.740 c 12.9543				
heptakis(μ_{2}-selenido)-(tetraethylenepentamine)-manganese(ii)-tri-tin(iv)	Mn(tepa)·Sn_{3}Se_{7}		orthorhombic	P2_{1}2_{1}2_{1}	a=12.533 b=13.709 c=13.989				
tetrakis(μ_{2}-selenido)-bis(seleno)-bis(tetraethylenepentamine)-di-manganese(ii)-di-tin(iv)	[Mn(tepa)]_{2}(μ_{2}-Sn_{2}Se_{6})		tetragonal	I4_{1}/a	a=26.483 b=26.483 c=10.1423				
hexakis(μ_{2}-selenido)-tetrakis(1,10-phenanthroline)-di-manganese-di-tin dihydrate	{[Mn(phen)_{2}]_{2}(μ_{2}-Sn_{2}Se_{6})}·H_{2}O		monoclinic	P2_{1}/n	a 11.061 b 10.061 c 25.21 β 90.081°				
catena-((μ_{3}-selenido)-bis(μ_{2}-selenido)-(1,10-phenanthroline)-manganese-tin)	[Mn(phen)]_{2}(μ_{4}-Sn_{2}Se_{6})		triclinic	P1̅	a 9.721 b 10.257 c 10.346, α 118.24° β 112.53° γ 95.75°				
hexakis(μ-2-aminoethan-1-olato)-octakis(μ-selenido)-hepta-manganese-di-tin	Mn_{7}(ea)_{6}(SnSe_{4})_{2}		orthorhombic	Pccn	a=14.886 b=19.354 c=12.4314 Z=4	3581.5	2.993	orange	
catena-(pentakis(μ_{2}-selenido)-bis(1,10-phenanthroline)-manganese-di-tin)	[Mn(phen)_{2}](Sn_{2}Se_{5})		monoclinic	C2/c	a 16.639 b 12.961 c 14.088β 117.91°				
catena-[tris(3-butyl-1,2-dimethyl-1H-imidazol-3-ium) bis(tris(ethane-1,2-diamine)-manganese) icosakis(μ-selenido)-selenido-nona-tin chloride]	(Bmmim)_{3}[Mn(en)_{3}]_{2}[Sn_{9}Se_{21}]Cl		monoclinic	P2_{1}/c	a=19.4488 b=19.5108 c=26.6148 β=109.587°			red	
catena-[hexakis(1-butyl-2,3-dimethyl-1H-imidazol-3-ium) bis((N-(2-(amino)ethyl)ethane-1,2-diamine)-manganese) tetratriacontakis(selenido)-selenido-pentadeca-tin]	(Bmmim)_{6}[Mn(dien)_{2}]_{2}Sn_{15}Se_{35}		monoclinic	P2_{1}/n	a=13.4256 b=29.904 c=19.5845 β=106.643°			red	
catena-[hemikis(tris(ethane-1,2-diamine)-manganese) hemikis((N-methylethane-1,2-diamine)-bis(ethane-1,2-diamine)-mangnaese) heptakis(μ-selenido)-tri-tin]	[Mn(en)_{2.5}(en-Me)_{0.5}][Sn_{3}Se_{7}]		monoclinic	P2_{1}/c	a=12.1058 b=13.2204 c=18.2504 β=120.839° Z=4	2507.9	3.049	orange	
catena-(bis(4-Aminobutan-1-aminium) tetrakis(μ_{2}-selenido)-manganese-tin)	(1,4-dabH)_{2}MnSnSe_{4}		orthorhombic	Fdd2	a =23.287 b=25.410 c=6.6053				
tetrakis(2,2'-bipyridine)-hexakis(μ-selenido)-di-tin-di-manganese	{Mn(2,2′-bipy)_{2}}_{2}(μ_{2}-Sn_{2}Se_{6})		monoclinic	P 2_{1}/n	a=8.756 b=20.960 c=12.484 β=95.66°				
hexakis(μ_{2}-Selenido)-bis(1,4,8,11-tetraazacyclotetradecane)-di-manganese(ii)-di-tin	{Mn(cyclam)}_{2}(μ-Sn_{2}Se_{6.15})		monoclinic	P2_{1}/n	a=9.949 b=16.783 c=11.649 β=105.208°				
hexakis(μ_{2}-Selenido)-bis(2,2';6',2''-terpyridine)-di-manganese(ii)-di-tin	{Mn(terpy)}_{2}(μ-Sn_{2}Se_{6})		triclinic	P1̅	a=9.430 b=10.872 c=11.090 α=117.86° β=102.83° γ=103.22°				
tris(μ_{2}-Selenido)-(2,2';6',2''-terpyridine)-manganese(ii)-tin	{Mn(terpy)}_{2}(μ-Sn_{2}Se_{6})		triclinic	P1̅	a=9.923 b=10.027 c=10.959 α=107.29° β=97.57° γ=115.10°				
	(NMe_{4})_{2}[MnSn_{4}Se_{10}]		tetragonal	I4̅	a=9.865 c =15.317			red	
	Li_{4}MnSn_{2}Se_{7}		monoclinic	Cc	a=18.126 b=7.221 c=10.470 β=93.43° Z=4	1403.2	4.132	orange	
DBN=1,5-diazabicyclo[4.3.0]non-5-ene	[DBNH]_{2}[MnSnSe_{4}]		tetragonal	P4_{2}/ncm	a=13.0305 c =6.6220				
	[Fe(tatda)]Sn_{3}Se_{7}		monoclinic	P2_{1}/n				1.93 eV	
catena-((bis(diethylenetriamine)-iron(ii)) bis(μ-selenido)-iron)	[Fe(dien)_{2}]FeSnSe_{4}		orthorhombic	C222_{1}	a =8.974 b =17.755 c =12.967			band gap 2.21 eV	
bis(bis(diethylenetriamine)-iron(ii)) bis(μ-selenido)-tetraselenido-di-tin	[Fe(dien)_{2}]_{2}Sn_{2}Se_{6}		monoclinic	P2_{1}/n	a=12.563 b=9.655 c=15.566 β=102.76°			band gap 2.60 eV	
bis(bis(diethylenetriamine)-iron(ii)) ethane-1,2-diammonium bis(2-ammonioethyl)amine bis(bis(μ-selenido)-tetraselenido-di-tin)	[H_{2}en][H_{2}dien][Fe(dien)_{2}]_{2}(Sn_{2}Se_{6})_{2}		triclinic	P1̅	a=8.727 b=12.794 c=14.918, α=66.09° β=84.06° γ=75.33°			band gap 2.58 eV	
catena-[tris(ethane-1,2-diamine)-iron(ii) (μ-diselenido)-hexakis(μ-selenido)-tri-tin]	[Fe(en)_{3}]Sn_{3}Se_{6}(Se_{2})		monoclinic	P2_{1}/c	a =11.950 b =14.083 c =17.995 β =120.25°				
tris(ethane-1,2-diamine)-iron(ii) tris[tetraselanato]-tin	[Fe(en)_{3}][Sn(Se_{4})_{3}]		triclinic	P1̅	a 10.223 b 12.106 c 12.263, α 89.40° β 89.40° γ 75.45°				
tatda = 3,6,9,12-tetraazatetradecane-1,14-diamine catena-[(3,6,9,12-tetraazatetradecane-1,14-diamine)-iron heptakis(μ-selenido)-tri-tin]	[Fe(tatda)]Sn_{3}Se_{7}		monoclinic	P2_{1}/n	a 12.1067 b 13.3225 c 17.0827 β 96.978°				
hexakis(μ_{2}-selenido)-tetrakis(1,10-phenanthroline)-di-iron-di-tin	[Fe(phen)_{2}]_{2}(μ_{2}-Sn_{2}Se_{6})		monoclinic	C2/c	a 26.192 b 11.248 c 17.843 β 98.816°				
catena-(bis(tris(1,10-phenanthroline)-iron) bis(μ_{3}-selenido)-dodecakis(μ_{2}-selenido)-hexa-tin hydrate)	[Fe(phen)_{3}](Sn_{3}Se_{7})·1.25H_{2}O		trigonal	R3̅c	a=13.9483 c 75.476			band gap 1.97 eV	
bipy = bipyridine catena-[nonakis(μ-selenido)-tetra-tin tris(2,2'-bipyridine)-iron dihydrate]	[Fe(bipy)_{3}]Sn_{4}Se_{9}·2H_{2}O		trigonal	R3̅c	a=26.902 c 30.673				
	[Fe(bipy)_{3}]_{2}[Sn_{3}Se_{7}]_{2}·bipy·2H_{2}O		monoclinic	P2_{1}/c	a 27.055 b 13.391 c 24.756, β 103.88°				
heptakis(μ-selenido)-(tetra-ethylenepentamine)-iron-tri-tin	Sn_{3}Se_{7}Fe(tepa)		orthorhombic	P2_{1}2_{1}2_{1}	a 12.4958 b 13.7745 c 14.0233		3.112	black	
bis[tris(ethane-1,2-diamine)-iron] 1,3,2,4-diselenadistannetane-2,2,4,4-tetrakis(selenolate)	[Fe(en)_{3}]_{2}Sn_{2}Se_{6}		orthorhombic	Pbca	a =15.5062(9)Å b=11.8662 c=19.0966		2.146	red	
	{CpFe(CO)_{2}}_{3}{CpFe(CO)}Sn_{3}Se_{4}		triclinic	P1̅	a 12.2066 b 12.584 c 13.0007, α 90.632° β 90.068° γ 120.836°				
	(NMe_{4})_{2}[FeSn_{4}Se_{10}]		tetragonal	I4̅	a=9.878 c=15.345				
	[Co(en)_{3}]_{2}Sn_{2}Se_{6}		orthorhombic	Pbca	a=15.640 b=11.564 c=18.742				
	[Co(dien)_{2}]_{2}Sn_{2}Se_{6}		monoclinic	P2_{1}/n	a=10.2224 b=14.5788 c=12.3921 β=91.237°	1846.4		yellow; black with water, ultrasound turns yellow	
	[Co(en)(trien)]_{2}Sn_{2}Se_{6}		monoclinic	P2_{1}/n	a 7.929 b 15.855 c 14.262 β 93.436°				
bis(tris(2,2'-bipyridine)-cobalt(ii)) heptakis(μ-selenido)-tri-tin(iv) hexakis(μ-selenido)-selenido-tri-tin(iv) 2,2'-bipyridine monohydrate	[Co(2,2′-bipy)_{3}]_{2}[Sn_{3}Se_{7}]_{2}·(2,2′-bipy)·H_{2}O		monoclinic	P2_{1}/c	a=27.032 b=13.392 c=24.763 β=103.85°				
catena-[tris(ethylenediamine)-nickel hemikis(heptakis(μ-selenato)-selenato-tri-tin) hemikis(hexakis(μ-selenato)-selenato-tri-tin)]	[Ni(en)_{3}][Sn_{3}Se_{6.5}(Se_{2})_{0.5}]		orthorhombic	Pca2_{1}	a =14.88 b =1.8872Å c =13.859			1.95 eV;chains of [Sn_{3}Se_{7}]_{n}^{2n–} and [Sn_{3}Se_{6}(Se)_{2}]_{n}^{2n–}	
tris(ethylenediamine)-nickel(ii) tetrakis(μ-selanyl)-selanyl-di-tin	[Ni(en)_{3}][Sn_{2}Se_{5}]		monoclinic	P2_{1}/n	a=8.7998 b=10.0736 c=22.655 β=90.763°				
	[Ni(en)_{3}]_{2}[Sn_{2}Se_{6}]		orthorhombic		a=15.288 b=11.937 c=19.239	3511.0			
catena-[tris(ethylenediamine)-nickel heptakis(μ-selenato)-tri-tin]	[Ni(en)_{3}][Sn_{3}Se_{7}]		monoclinic	P2_{1}/n	a=12.32 b=13.19 c=15.73 β=101.07°			band gap 2.01 eV	
catena-[tris(1,2-diaminoethane)-nickel(ii) pentakis(μ-selenido)-bis(selenido)-tri-tin(iv)]	[Ni(en)_{3}]Sn_{3}Se_{7.5}		orthorhombic	Pca2_{1}	a 14.869 b 11.888 c 13.860				
tris(ethane-1,2-diamine)-nickel tris[tetraselanato]-tin	[Ni(en)_{3}][Sn(Se_{4})_{3}]		triclinic	P1̅	a 10.104 b 12.048 c 12.107, α 89.52° β 75.44° γ 75.78°				
phen = 1,10-phenanthroline tris(1,10-phenanthroline)-nickel(ii) heptakis(μ-selenato)-tri-tin(iv) sesquihydrate	[Ni(phen)_{3}]Sn_{3}Se_{7}·1.5H_{2}O		trigonal	R3̅	a=13.971 c=38.281				
	[(Ni_{0.4}Zn_{0.6})(en)_{6}]Sn_{2}Se_{6}								
catena-(tetrakis(1-n-Butyl-2,3-dimethylimidazolium) hemikis((μ_{2}-triethylenetetramine)-bis(triethylenetetramine)-di-nickel) tris(μ_{3}-selenido)-heptadecakis(μ_{2}-selenido)-selenido-nona-tin)	2D-(Bmmim)_{8}[Ni_{2}(teta)_{2}(μ-teta)]Sn_{18}Se_{42}		monoclinic	P2_{1}/n	a =18.9764 b= 25.1081 c =20.5731 β =100.870°				
teta = triethylenetetramine (ethylenediamine)-(triethylenetetramine)-nickel(ii) (triethylenetetramine)-(N-(2-hydroxyethyl)ethylenediamine)-nickel(ii) hexakis(μ-selenido)-tetrakis(selenido)-tetra-tin	[Ni(teta)(en)][Ni(teta)(hda)][Sn_{4}Se_{10}]		monoclinic	P2_{1}/n	a 12.3191 b 17.7104 c 22.643 β 95.278°				
tepa=tetraethylenepentamine catena-(tetrakis(1-n-Butyl-2,3-dimethylimidazolium) bis(chloro-(tetraethylenepentamine)-nickel) pentakis(μ_{3}-selenido)-tricosakis(μ_{2}-selenido)-(tetraethylenepentamine)-nickel-dodeca-tin)	2D-(Bmmim)_{4}[Ni(tepa)Cl]_{2}[Ni(tepa)Sn_{12}Se_{28}]		monoclinic	Pn	a=21.2230 b=13.4993 c=23.8715 β =112.461°				
Bmmim=1-butyl-2,3-dimethylimidazolium	2D-(Bmmim)_{3}[Ni(en)_{3}]_{2}[Sn_{9}Se_{21}]Cl		monoclinic	P2_{1}/c	a 19.488 b 19.626 c 26.793 β 109.930°				
catena-(bis(1-n-Butyl-2,3-dimethylimidazolium) bis(tris(propane-1,2-diamine)-nickel) bis(bis(μ_{3}-selenido)-heptakis(μ_{2}-selenido)-tetra-tin))	3D-(Bmmim)_{2}[Ni(1,2-pda)_{3}]Sn_{8}Se_{18}		trigonal	R3̅c	a=27.7913 c 47.4281				
catena-[bis(N-(2-(amino)ethyl)ethane-1,2-diamine)-nickel sesquikis(3-butyl-1,2-dimethyl-1H-imidazol-3-ium) hemikis(2-amino-N-(2-aminoethyl)ethylammonium) octadecakis(μ-selenido)-octa-tin]	2D-(Bmmim)_{2}[Ni(teta)(en)][Sn_{3}Se_{7}]_{2}		monoclinic	P2_{1}/c	a=31.088 b=10.5393 c=19.9712 β=99.966°				
catena-[(N,N'-bis(2-(amino)ethyl)ethane-1,2-diamine)-(ethane-1,2-diamine)-nickel bis(1-butyl-2,3-dimethyl-1H-imidazol-3-ium) tridecakis(μ-selenido)-selenido-hexa-tin]	3D-(Bmmim)_{1.5}(dienH)_{0.5}Ni(dien)_{2}[Sn_{4}Se_{9}]_{2}		monoclinic	P2_{1}/c	a=24.3753 b=13.3778 c=17.7885 β=93.949°				
	[Ni(tren)(en)]SnSe_{3}∙H_{2}O	638.64	monoclinic	P2_{1}/n	a=12.8150 b=10.0094 c=15.6626 β=???? Z=4	1885.8		band gap	
bis((tris(2-aminoethyl)amine)-(ethane-1,2-diamine)-nickel(ii)) bis(μ-sulfido)-tetrathiolato-di-tin dihydrate	[Ni(tren)(en)]_{2}[Sn_{2}S_{6}]·2H_{2}O		monoclinic	P2_{1}/n	a 12.7041 b 9.8000 c 15.3989 β 108.843°			3.23 eV	
bis((tris(2-aminoethyl)amine)-(ethane-1,2-diamine)-nickel(ii)) bis(μ-sulfido)-tetrathiolato-di-tin hexahydrate	[Ni(tren)(en)]_{2}[Sn_{2}S_{6}]·6H_{2}O		monoclinic	P2_{1}/c	a 12.5580 b 9.7089 c 16.0359 β 91.827°			3.16 eV	
bis((tris(2-aminoethyl)amine)-(cyclohexane-1,2-diamine)-nickel(ii)) bis(μ-sulfido)-tetrathiolato-di-tin trihydrate	[Ni(tren)(1,2-dach)]_{2}[Sn_{2}S_{6}]·3H_{2}O		triclinic	P1̅	a 9.8121 b 10.0080 c 12.422, α 86.38° β 79.65° γ 65.71°			3.43 eV	
bis((tris(2-aminoethyl)amine)-(cyclohexane-1,2-diamine)-nickel(ii)) bis(μ-sulfido)-tetrathiolato-di-tin tetrahydrate	[Ni(tren)(1,2-dach)]_{2}[Sn_{2}S_{6}]·4H_{2}O		monoclinic	P2_{1}/c	a 10.7119 b 19.0797 c 11.1005 β 104.803°			3.29 eV	
bis((tris(2-aminoethyl)amine)-(propane-1,2-diamine)-nickel(ii)) bis(μ-sulfido)-tetrathiolato-di-tin tetrahydrate	[Ni(tren)(1,2-dap)]_{2}[Sn_{2}S_{6}]·4H_{2}O		monoclinic	C2/c	a 14.3925 b 15.1550 c 18.9307 β 99.108°			3.32 eV	
bis((tris(2-aminoethyl)amine)-(2-(aminomethyl)pyridine)-nickel(ii)) bis(μ-sulfido)-tetrathiolato-di-tin decahydrate	[Ni(tren)(2amp)]_{2}[Sn_{2}S_{6}]·10H_{2}O		monoclinic	P2_{1}/n	a 12.1933 b 13.4025 c 14.8920 β 103.090°			3.28 eV	
L_{1} = 1,8-dimethyl-1,3,6,8,10,13-hexaazacyclotetradecane	[Ni(L_{1})][Ni(L_{1})Sn_{2}S_{6}]_{n}·2H_{2}O		monoclinic	P2_{1}/c	a 11.6481 b 14.4268 c 10.8450 β 95.449°			brown	
L_{2} = 1,8-diethyl-1,3,6,8,10,13-hexaazacyclotetradecane	[Ni(L_{2})]_{2}[Sn_{2}S_{6}]·4H_{2}O		triclinic	P1̅	a 9.1562 b 10.3705 c 12.2897 α 66.761° β 85.350° γ 81.308°				
(μ_{2}-triethylenetetramine)-bis(triethylenetetramine)-di-nickel(ii) tetrachloride dihydrate	[Ni_{2}(trien)_{2}(μ-trien)]Cl_{4}·2H_{2}O		orthorhombic	Pbca	a 13.737 b 13.089 c 18.193				
bis(tris(2,2'-bipyridine)-nickel(ii)) heptakis(μ-selenido)-tri-tin(iv) hexakis(μ-selenido)-selenido-tri-tin(iv) 2,2'-bipyridine monohydrate	[Ni(2,2′-bipy)_{3}]_{2}[Sn_{3}Se_{7}]_{2}·(2,2′-bipy)·H_{2}O		monoclinic	P 2_{1}/c	a=26.999 b=13.383 c=24.714 β=103.89°				
	Cu_{2}SnSe_{4}			F3m				thermoelectric	
	(1,4-dabH_{2})Cu_{2}SnSe_{4}		orthorhombic	P4_{2}/n	a=14.956 b=14.956 c=12.017				
	Na_{6}Cu_{8}Sn_{3}Se_{13}		cubic	Fm3̅c	a =18.4754				
	[Cu_{2}SnSe_{5}][Mn(Hen)_{2}(en)]		monoclinic	P2_{1}/c	a 9.640 b 21.04 c 10.611 β 100.72°			1.49 eV	
	[(Mn_{1.67}Zn_{0.33})(en)_{6}]Sn_{2}Se_{6}								
	K_{2}Cu_{2}Sn_{2}Se_{6}		monoclinic	C2/c	Z=8			black; band gap 1.04 eV	
Copper zinc tin selenide	Cu_{2}ZnSnSe_{4}							black; photovoltaic 11.6% efficient	
catena-[tris(ethane-1,2-diamine)-zinc(ii) (μ-diselenido)-hexakis(μ-selenido)-tri-tin]	[Zn(en)_{3}]Sn_{3}Se_{6}(Se_{2})		monoclinic	P2_{1}/n	a 11.949 b 14.060 c 15.794 β 100.39°				
tris(ethane-1,2-diamine)-zinc(ii) tris[tetraselanato]-tin	[Zn(en)_{3}][Sn(Se_{4})_{3}]		triclinic	P1̅	a 10.156 b 12.096 c 12.109, α 89.64° β 75.49° γ 75.87°				
	Zn_{2}(en)_{2}(μ_{4}-SnSe_{4})		tetragonal	I4_{1}/a	a =7.8032 c =31.528				
tetrakis(μ-selenido)-bis(selenido)-bis(N,N-bis(2-aminoethyl)ethane-1,2-diamine)-di-tin(iv)-di-zinc(ii)	{Zn(tren)}_{2}(μ-Sn_{2}Se_{6})		monoclinic	C2/c	a 12.414 b 9.846 c 23.970° β 102.395°	2861.5		band gap 2.38 eV	
tetrakis(μ-selenido)-bis(selenido)-bis(bis(2-(2-aminoethyl)aminoethyl)amine)-di-tin(iv)-di-zinc(ii)	{Zn(tepa)}_{2}(μ-Sn_{2}Se_{6})		tetragonal	I4_{1}/a	a=26.6205 c =10.0533	7124.3		band gap 2.31 eV	
catena-[bis(dimethylammonium) octakis(μ-selenido)-tri-tin(iv)-zinc(ii)]	[(Me)_{2}NH_{2}]_{2}ZnSn_{3}Se_{8}		monoclinic	C2	a=10.961 b=11.056 c=9.683 β=105.17°				
	(Me_{4}N)_{2}Zn[Sn_{4}Se_{10}]								
DBN=1,5-diazabicyclo[4.3.0]non-5-ene	[DBNH]_{2}[ZnSnSe_{4}]		tetragonal	P4_{2}/ncm	a=13.033 c 6.548			band gap 2.42 eV	
	K_{2}ZnSn_{3}Se_{8}		monoclinic	P2_{1}	a 7.639 b 12.400 c 18.384 β 98.13°			band gap 2.10 eV	
	Cu_{2}ZnSnSe_{4}								
	[NH_{4}]_{2}Ga_{4}Se_{8}Sn_{4}		monoclinic	P2_{1}/c	a 7.582 b 12.501 c 18.377 β 96.43°				
catena-(1-ethylpyridinium hexakis(μ-selenido)-gallium-di-tin hydrate)	H_{3}CCH_{2}NC_{5}H_{5}GaSn_{2}Se_{6} ∙ 0.25H_{2}O		tetragonal	I4_{1}/a	a=26.401 c =10.464			orange	
x~0.25	Na_{2−x}Ga_{2−x}Sn_{1+x}Se_{6}		monoclinic	C2	a=13.308 b=7.594 c=13.842 β=118.730°	1226.7			
	K_{3}Ga_{6}Sn_{6}Se_{12}		cubic	Pa3̅	a=13.5555 Z=12	2490.8	4.347	colourless	
	KGaSnSe_{4}		cubic	Pa3̅	a=13.5555 Z=12	2490.8	4.347	orange	
	[(TEPA)Mn]^{2+}_{4}[Sn_{4}Ga_{4}Zn_{2}Se_{20}]^{8−}		tetragonal	P4̅b2	a=17.4951 c 13.5849				
	(Et_{4}N)_{2}[Sn_{6}Se_{10}Br_{6}]		monoclinic	P2_{1}/n	a = 14.0826 b = 14.1904 c = 24.277 β = 92.809° Z = 4	4845.6			
	Rb_{2}Sn_{2}Se_{5}		monoclinic	C2/c	a=11.555 b=8.478 c=12.030 β=108.60 Z=4	1117	4.78	black; oxygen sensitive	
	Rb_{4}Sn_{4}Se_{10}·1.5H_{2}O			R3̅	a 15.539 c 21.373				
	Rb_{2}Cu_{2}Sn_{2}Se_{6}		monoclinic	C2/c	Z=8			black; band gap 1.04 eV	
	RbGaSnSe_{4}		cubic	Pa3̅	a=13.7200	2582.63	4.550	orange	
	Rb_{2}Sn_{4}Se_{9}-H_{2}O		orthorhombic	Pnma	a=13.298 b=12.418 c=12.563				
	Rb_{2}MnSn_{3}Se_{8}		monoclinic	P2_{1}	a 7.7864 b 12.6343 c 18.4878 β 95.810°				
	Rb_{2}MnSnSe_{4}		monoclinic	P2_{1}/n	a=8.6015 b=10.956 c=10.675 β=90°				
	Rb_{4}Cu_{8}Sn_{3}S_{12}		cubic	Fm3̅c	a=18.0851				
	(H_{3}O)RbCu_{6}Sn_{2}S_{8}		tetragonal	I4/m	a=14.8834 c=7.6466				
	SrZnSnSe_{4}		orthorhombic	Fdd2	a 21.6984 b 21.873 c 13.1140				
catena-[(μ-hydroxo)-bis(μ-selenido)-(N-(2-aminoethyl)-N'-(2-((2-aminoethyl)amino)ethyl)ethane-1,2-diamine)-selenido-tin-yttrium]	[Y_{2}(tepa)_{2}(μ-OH)_{2}Sn_{2}Se_{6}]		orthorhombic	Pbca	a=12.4190 b=13.6062 c=20.6569 Z=8		2.467	orange	
bis(bis(μ_{2}-hydroxo)-bis(N-(2-aminoethyl)-N'-(2-((2-aminoethyl)amino)ethyl)ethane-1,2-diamine)-dichloro-di-yttrium) hexakis(μ_{2}-selenido)-tetrakis(selenido)-tetra-tin tetrahydrate	[Y_{2}(tepa)_{2}(μ_{2}-OH)_{2}Cl_{2}]_{2}[Sn_{4}Se_{10}]·4H_{2}O		tetragonal	I4_{1}/a	a=28.24 c=10.940		2.025	yellow	
	Ru(bpy)_{3}[Sn_{4}Se_{9}]	1755.02	trigonal	R3c	a=27.240 c=31.01 Z=18	19927	2.632	dark red	
	β-Ag_{8}SnSe_{6}			Pmn2_{1}					
	[NH_{4}]_{3}AgSn_{3}Se_{8}		tetragonal	P4/nbm	a=8.2155 c=13.413			thermochromic: gold-darkred-gold	
	[NH_{4}]_{4}Ag_{12}Sn_{7}Se_{22}		monoclinic	C2/c	a=52.634 b=6.8175 c=13.5176 β=99.955 Z=4	4959.1	5.270	black; band gap 1.21 eV	
	[(Me)_{2}NH_{2}]_{0.75}[Ag_{1.25}SnSe_{3}]		tetragonal	P4̅2_{1}m	a=13.998 c=8.685 Z=8	1701.9	4.403	dark red; band gap 1.85 eV	
	[CH_{3}NH_{3}]_{2}[H_{3}O]Ag_{5}Sn_{4}Se_{12}·C_{2}H_{5}OH		tetragonal	P4̅2_{1}m	a=13.6350 c 9.1491 Z=8			band gap 1.80 eV	
catena-[bis(methylammonium) dimethylammonium dodecakis(μ-selenido)-penta-silver-tetra-tin]	[NH_{3}CH_{3}]_{0.5}[NH_{2}(CH_{3})_{2}]_{0.25}Ag_{1.25}SnSe_{3}		tetragonal	P4̅2_{1}m	b =13.7193 c 9.0964		4.019		
	[bmmim]_{7}[AgSn_{12}Se_{28}]		triclinic	P1̅				band gap 2.2 eV	
heptakis(1,2-dimethyl-3-propyl-1H-imidazol-3-ium) bis(μ_{3}-selenido)-hexacosakis(μ_{2}-selenido)-dodeca-tin-silver	[Mmpmim]_{7}Ag_{5}Sn_{4}Se_{12}∙3H_{2}O		triclinic	P1̅	a 10.8983 b 13.5554 c 23.091 α 88.904° β 86.700° γ 68.230°				
catena-[N^{1}-(2-azaniumylethyl)ethane-1,2-bis(aminium) dodeca-selenium-tetra-tin-penta-silver trihydrate]	[H_{3}dien][Ag_{5}Sn_{4}Se_{12}]∙3H_{2}O			P4̅2_{1}	a =14.2623 b =14.2623 c =9.3022				
	K_{2}Ag_{2}SnSe_{4}			P2/c				band gap 1.8 eV	
	K_{2}Ag_{2}Sn_{2}Se_{6}			P4/mmc					
	K_{3}AgSn_{3}Se_{8}			P4/nbm				band gap 1.8 eV	
	[Mn(NH_{3})_{6}][Ag_{4}Mn_{4}Sn_{3}Se_{13}]		orthorhombic	F4̅3c	a 19.1263Å b 19.1263Å c 19.1263				
catena-(2-aminoethylammonium bis(μ_{4}-sulfido)-bis(μ_{3}-sulfido)-tin-di-copper-silver)	[enH][Cu_{2}AgSnS_{4}]		orthorhombic	Pnma	a=19.726 b=7.8544 c=6.5083 Z=4	1008.35	3.577	red	
	[Zn(NH_{3})_{6}][Ag_{4}Zn_{4}Sn_{3}Se_{13}]		orthorhombic	F4̅3c	a=18.9679 b=18.9679 c=18.9679				
	(1,4-dabH_{2})Cu_{1.72}Ag_{0.28}SnSe_{4}		tetragonal	P4_{2}/n	a=14.990 c=12.059			band gap 2.43 eV	
	Rb_{3}AgSn_{3}Se_{8}			P4/nbm				band gap 1.8 eV	
	Li_{6.4}Cd_{4.8}Sn_{4}Se_{16}		orthorhombic	Pna2_{1}	a=14.400 b=8.399 c=6.787			band gap 1.95 eV	
tetrakis(2,3,4,6,7,8-Hexahydro-1H-pyrrolo[1,2-a]pyrimidin-5-ium) bis(μ_{3}-diselenido)-undecakis(μ_{2}-selenido)-tri-cadmium-tetra-tin	[DBNH]_{4}[Cd_{3}Sn_{4}Se_{11}(Se_{2})_{2}]		monoclinic	C2/c	a=22.236 b=12.623 c=21.756 β=109.91°				
	Cd(tren)SnSe_{3}		triclinic	P1̅	a=7.752 b=8.128 c=12.467, α=97.299° β=103.639° γ=107.325° Z=2	712.1	2.865		
	K_{2}CdSnSe_{4}	625.16	tetragonal	I4̅2m	a=8.084 c=6.920	452.24		photocatalyst	
	Cu_{2}CdSnSe_{4}								
catena-(1-ethylpyridinium hexakis(μ-selenido)-indium-di-tin hydrate)	CH_{3}CH_{2}NC_{5}H_{5}InSn_{2}Se_{6} ∙ 0.25H_{2}O		tetragonal	I4_{1}/a	a=26.946 c =10.283			orange	
	[NH_{4}]_{2}[In_{2}Sn_{2}Se_{8}]		tetragonal	I4/mcm	a=b 8.3731 c 6.719				
catena-[tris(1,10-phenanthroline)-cobalt octakis(μ-selenido)-di-indium-di-tin cyclohexylamine solvate tetrahydrate]	Co(phen)_{3}In_{2}Sn_{2}Se_{8} ∙ C_{6}H_{11}NH_{2} ∙ 4H_{2}O		monoclinic	P2_{1}/n	a=15.610 b=24.238 c=15.828 β=107.04° Z=4	5726	2.169	orange	
tris(1,10-phenanthroline)-nickel octakis(μ-selenido)-di-indium-di-tin cyclohexylamine solvate tetrahydrate	Ni(phen)_{3}In_{2}Sn_{2}Se_{8} ∙ C_{6}H_{11}NH_{2}		monoclinic	P2_{1}/n	a=15.574 b=24.083 c=15.804 β=107.11° Z=4	5665	2.192	orange	
	RbInSnSe_{4}		cubic	Pa3̅	a=13.9728 Z=12	2728.04	4.637	red; air sensitive	
	RbInSnSe_{4}		monoclinic	P2_{1}/c	a= 7.8104 b= 12.6533 c= 18.7062 β= 96.297	1837.52	4.589	orange	
	Cs_{2}Sn_{2}Se_{5} . H_{2}O		orthorhombic	Ama2	a =12.05 b =12.405 c =9.426				
	Cs_{2}Sn_{2}Se_{5}								
	Cs_{2}Sn_{2}Se_{6}		triclinic	P1̅	a =7.129 b =7.285 c =7.965, α =95.8° β =115.38° γ =108.46°				
	Cs_{2}Sn_{3}Se_{7}		monoclinic	C2/c	a = 23.214, b = 13.679, c =14,657, β= 111.92°, Z = 8,	4317		red; SnSe_{5} trigonal bipyramids connected in sheets	
	Cs_{4}Sn_{2}Se_{6}							yellow; tetrahedral edge-shared pairs	
	Cs_{4}Sn_{4}Se_{10}·3.2H_{2}O		triclinic	P1̅	a=7.235 b=9.468 c=11.235 α=68.77° β=83.25° γ=84.53°				
	Cs_{2}Sn_{4}Se_{9}-H_{2}O		orthorhombic	Pnma	a =13.514 b =12.54 c =12.679				
(4,7,13,16,21,24-Hexaoxa-1,10-diazabicyclo(8.8.8)hexacosane)-potassium tris(μ_{3}-selenido)-tris(μ_{2}-selenido)-bis(1,2-ethylenediamine-N)-(4,7,13,16,21,24-hexaoxa-1,10-diazabicyclo(8.8.8)hexacosane)-di-cesium-potassium-di-tin(iv)	[K-(2,2,2-crypt)]_{2}Cs_{2}Sn_{2}Se_{6}·2en		triclinic	P1̅	a=10.0019 b=13.8929 c=24.478 α=100.204° β=95.701° γ=90.147°				
	Cs[Cr(en)_{2}SnSe_{4}]	739.67	monoclinic	P2_{1}/n	a=7.6800 b=13.1483 c=15.7069 β=91.176° Z=4	1585.7	3.098	black	
	Cs_{2}MnSnSe_{4}		orthorhombic	Fddd	a=6.4075 b=14.416 c=24.820				
	Cs_{2}MgSn_{3}Se_{8}		orthorhombic	P2_{1}2_{1}2_{1}	a 7.9055 b 12.7661 c 18.474				
	Cs_{2}MnSn_{3}Se_{8}		orthorhombic	P2_{1}2_{1}2_{1}	a 7.8798 b 12.7040 c 18.4556				
	Mn_{4}Cs_{10}Se_{17}Sn_{4} ∙ 15.5H_{2}O		triclinic	P1̅	a 13.717 b 15.502 c 18.481 α 77.02° β 74.35° γ 69.71° Z=2	3512	3.418	red	
	Zn_{4}Cs_{10}Se_{17}Sn_{4} ∙ 17H_{2}O		triclinic	P1̅	a 13.537 b 15.256 c 18.41, α 76.98° β 73.78° γ 69.57° Z=2	3386	3.577	yellow	
	Cs_{2}ZnSn_{3}Se_{8}		orthorhombic	P2_{1}2_{1}2_{1}	a 7.8146 b 12.6534 c 18.3747				
	CsGaSnSe_{4}		orthorhombic	Pmcn	a 7.6785Å b 12.655Å c 18.278				
	Cd_{4}Cs_{10}Se_{17}Sn_{4} ∙ 17H_{2}O		triclinic	P1̅	a 17.8678 b 17.7949 c 23.5518 α 98.682° β 105.75° γ 90.307° Z=4	7116	3.617	yellow	
	Cs_{2}CdSn_{3}Se_{8}		orthorhombic	P2_{1}2_{1}2_{1}	a 7.9335 b 12.7336 c 18.5387				
	CsInSnSe_{4}		cubic	Pa3̅	a=14.1932 Z=12	2959.2	4.755	red; air sensitive	
	Ba_{2}SnSe_{4}	709.21	monoclinic	P2_{1}/c	a 8.582 b 9.255 c 12.460 β 114.28° Z=4	902.2	5.221	orange	
	α-Ba_{2}SnSe_{5}		orthorhombic	P2_{1}2_{1}2_{1}				dark brown	
	β-Ba_{2}SnSe_{5}		monoclinic	P2_{1}/c	a = 9.3949 b = 8.8656 c = 12.5745 β = 113.299° Z = 4	961.9		high temperature; red	
	m-Ba_{2}SnSe_{5}		monoclinic	P12_{1}/c1	a = 21.17189 b = 9.0915 c = 24.7141 β = 125.621°				
	Ba_{6}Sn_{6}Se_{13}		orthorhombic	P2_{1}2_{1}2_{1}	a 9.2998 b 12.384 c 26.896 Z=4	3097.8	5.495	black; 1.52 eV	
	Li_{2}Ba_{7}Sn_{4}Se_{16}		cubic	I4̅3d	a=15.1628 Z=4	3486.1	5.170 ?	red	
	Na_{2}Ba_{7}Sn_{4}Se_{16}		cubic	I4̅3d	a=14.807 Z=4	3246	4.082	red	
	BaZnSnSe_{4}		orthorhombic	Fdd2	a 22.2402 b 22.7047 c 13.1972	6664.0	5.081	red; band gap 1.95 eV	
	BaGa_{2}SnSe_{6}		trigonal	R3	a = 10.145 c = 9.249 Z = 3	824.4	5.253	red NLO 5.2 × AgGaS_{2} at 2.09 μm birefringence 0.1649 at 1.064 μm	
	Ba_{4}Ga_{4}SnSe_{12}							band gap 2.14	
	BaAg_{2}SnSe_{4}		orthorhombic	I222	a=7.10 b=7.47 c=8.30			band gap 0.2 eV	
	BaCdSnSe_{4}	684.27	orthorhombic	Fdd2	a 22.38 b 22.71 c 13.588 Z=32	6907	5.265	orange	
catena-(hexakis(μ_{2}-selenido)-(N-(2-(amino)ethyl)-N'-(2-((2-(amino)ethyl)amino)ethyl)ethane-1,2-diaminato)-di-tin-lanthanum hemihydrate)	(H_{3}O)[La(tepa)(μ-1κ^{2}:2κ^{2}-Sn_{2}Se_{6})]		monoclinic	C2/c	a=13.845 b=9.805 c=22.010 β=105.949°				
tetrakis(μ-selenido)-bis(3,6,9,12-tetraazatetradecane-1,14-diamine)-nitrato-chloro-di-lanthanum(iii)-tin	{La(peha)(Cl)}{La(peha)(NO_{3})}(μ-1κ^{2}:2κ^{2}-SnSe_{4})]		triclinic	P1̅	a 8.411 b 14.760 c 16.244 α 92.57° β 91.95° γ 102.18° Z=2	1967.3	2.15	light yellow	
2,2'-(ethane-1,2-diyldiimino)diethanaminium tetrakis(μ-selenido)-tetrakis(triethylenetetramine )-diselenido-di-tin-di-lanthanum(iii) bis(μ-selenido)-tetraselenido-di-tin monohydrate	[H_{2}trien][{La(trien)_{2}}_{2}(μ-1κ:2κ-Sn_{2}Se_{6})][Sn_{2}Se_{6}]·H_{2}O		monoclinic	P2_{1}/c	a=14.903 b=16.763 c=16.552 β=101.231° Z=2	4056	2.01	orange	
	[{La(dien)_{2}}_{4}(μ_{4}-Sn_{2}Se_{9})(μ-Sn_{2}Se_{6})]_{∞}		triclinic	P1̅	a 10.253 b 13.061 c 15.847 α 80.62° β 73.59° γ 88.60° Z=1	2007.9	2.514	red	
	[La_{2}(en)_{8}(μ-Se_{2})]Sn_{2}Se		monoclinic	P2_{1}/n	a 10.079 b 14.843 c 14.918 β 90.599° Z=2	2231.7	2.422	yellow	
	La_{3}AgSnSe_{7}			P6_{3}					
catena-(hexakis(μ_{2}-Selenido)-(tetraethylenepentamine)-cerium-di-tin monohydrate)	(H_{3}O)[Ce(tepa)(μ-1κ^{2}:2κ^{2}-Sn_{2}Se_{6})]		monoclinic	C2/c	a=13.852 b=9.802 c=22.035 β=105.98°				
tetrakis(μ_{2}-Selenido)-bis(triethylenetetramine)-bis(tris(2-aminoethyl)amine)-diselenido-di-cerium-di-tin bis((2-((2-aminoethyl)amino)ethyl)(2-aminoethyl)ammonium) bis(μ_{2}-selenido)-tetraselenido-di-tin	[Htrien]_{2}[{Ce(trien)(tren)}_{2}(μ-1κ:2κ-Sn_{2}Se_{6})]		triclinic	P1̅	a 9.832 b 10.584 c 18.091, α 90.097° β 92.448° γ 94.500°				
	[{Ce(dien)_{2}}_{4}(μ_{4}-Sn_{2}Se_{9})(μ-Sn_{2}Se_{6})]_{∞}		triclinic	P1̅	a 10.2333 b 13.0790 c 15.7663, α 80.422° β 73.738° γ 88.376° Z=1	1997.1	2.532	orange	
	[{Ce(en)_{4}}_{2}(μ-Se_{2})]Sn_{2}Se_{6}		monoclinic	P2_{1}/n	a 10.094 b 16.616 c 13.397 β 101.878° Z=2	2198.9	2.462	light yellow	
	BaCeSn_{2}Se_{6}		orthorhombic	Pmc2_{1}	a=4.1908 b=20.749 c=12.406				
tetrakis(μ_{2}-Selenido)-bis(triethylenetetramine)-bis(tris(2-aminoethyl)amine)-diselenido-di-neodymium-di-tin bis((2-((2-aminoethyl)amino)ethyl)(2-aminoethyl)ammonium) bis(μ_{2}-selenido)-tetraselenido-di-tin	[Htrien]_{2}[{Pr(trien)(tren)}_{2}(μ-1κ:2κ-Sn_{2}Se_{6})]		triclinic	P1̅	a 9.842 b 10.578 c 18.080, α 90.065° β 92.532° γ 94.511°				
catena-[(μ-hydroxo)-bis(μ-selenido)-(N-(2-aminoethyl)-N'-(2-((2-aminoethyl)amino)ethyl)ethane-1,2-diamine)-selenido-tin-praseodymium]	[Pr_{2}(tepa)_{2}(μ-OH)_{2}Sn_{2}Se_{6}]		orthorhombic	Pbca	a=12.450 b=13.617 c=21.005 Z=8		2.622	orange	
	[{Pr(en)_{3}}_{2}(μ-OH)_{2}]Sn_{2}Se_{6}		monoclinic	P2_{1}/n	a 10.197 b 11.7622 c 15.497 β 98.967° Z=2	1835.9	2.510	yellow	
catena-(bis(μ_{2}-hydroxo)-tetrakis(μ_{2}-selenido)-bis(N-(2-aminoethyl)-N'-(2-((2-aminoethyl)amino)ethyl)ethane-1,2-diamine)-diselenido-di-neodymium-di-tin)	[{Nd(tepa)(μ-OH)}_{2}(μ-1κ:2κ-Sn_{2}Se_{6})]		orthorhombic	Pbca	a=12.485 b=13.601 c=20.917				
	[{Nd(en)_{3}}_{2}(μ-OH)_{2}]Sn_{2}Se_{6}		monoclinic	P2_{1}/n	a 10.176 b 11.772 c 15.470 β 99.128° Z=2	1829.8	2.531	yellow	
	[{Nd(dien)_{2}}_{4}(μ_{4}-Sn_{2}Se_{9})(μ-Sn_{2}Se_{6})]_{∞}		triclinic	P1̅	a 10.184 b 12.979 c 15.751, α 80.448° β 73.991° γ 88.552° Z=1	1973.1	2.576	red	
ethane-1,2-diaminium tris(N-(2-(amino)ethyl)ethane-1,2-diamine)-samarium 1,3,2,4-diselenadistannetane-2,2,4,4-tetrakis(selenolate)	[Hen][Sm(dien)_{3}]Sn_{2}Se_{6}		triclinic	P1̅	a=10.044 b=12.803 c=15.811 α=66.32° β=72.86° γ=68.35°				
bis(bis(N,N-bis(2-(amino)ethyl)ethane-1,2-diamine)-chloro-samarium) hemikis(N,N-bis(2-aminoethyl)ethane-1,2-diamine) bis(μ-selenido)-tetrakis(selenido)-di-tin	[Sm(trien)(tren)(Cl)]_{2}Sn_{2}Se_{6}·0.5en		triclinic	P1̅	a=10.348 b=10.575 c=14.043 α=77.26° β=87.78° γ=61.410°				
bis(N,N'-bis(2-(amino)ethyl)ethane-1,2-diamine)-bis(ethane-1,2-diamine)-bis(μ-hydroxy)di-samarium 1,3,2,4-diselenadistannetane-2,2,4,4-tetrakis(selenolate)	[{Sm(en)(trien)}_{2}(μ-OH)_{2}]Sn_{2}Se_{6}		triclinic	P1̅	a=10.044 b=12.803 c=15.811, α=66.32° β=72.86° γ=68.35°				
catena-[bis(μ-selenido)-(μ-hydroxo)-(3,6,9-triazaundecan-1,11-diamine)-selenido-samarium-tin hemihydrate]	[{Sm(tepa)(μ-OH)}_{2} (μ-1κ:2κ-Sn_{2}Se_{6})]_{n}·nH_{2}O		monoclinic	C2/c	a=22.944 b=11.946 c=18.907 β=125.53° Z=4	4217	2.27	yellow	
	[Hdien][Sm(dien)_{2}(μ-SnSe_{4})]		monoclinic	P2/c	a 10.185 b 9.471 c 13.808 β 102.256°				
	Eu_{8}(Sn_{4}Se_{14})(Se_{3})_{2}		orthorhombic	P2_{1}2_{1}2	a = 11.990 b = 16.425 c = 8.543				
catena-[bis(μ-selenido)-(μ-hydroxo)-(3,6,9-triazaundecan-1,11-diamine)-selenido-europium-tin hemihydrate]	[{Eu(tepa)(μ-OH)}_{2} (μ-1κ:2κ-Sn_{2}Se_{6})]_{n}·nH_{2}O		monoclinic	C2/c	a=22.904 b=11.981 c=18.894 β=125.52° Z=4	4220	2.28	yellow	
	[Hdien][Eu(dien)_{2}(μ-SnSe_{4})]		monoclinic	P2/c	a 10.185 b 9.453 c 13.791 β 102.165°				
	[Eu_{2}(dien)_{4}(μ-OH)_{2}]Sn_{2}Se_{6}		monoclinic	P2_{1}/n	a 12.027 b 11.802 c 13.827 β 99.179°				
	[{Eu(en)_{3}}_{2}(μ-OH)_{2}]Sn_{2}Se_{6}		monoclinic	P2_{1}/n	a = 10.136 b = 11.771 c = 15.423 β = 99.322° Z = 2	1815.8			
catena-(bis(μ_{2}-hydroxo)-tetrakis(μ_{2}-selenido)-bis(N-(2-aminoethyl)-N'-(2-((2-aminoethyl)amino)ethyl)ethane-1,2-diamine)-diselenido-di-gadolinium-di-tin monohydrate)	[{Gd(tepa)(μ-OH)}_{2}(μ-1κ:2κ-Sn_{2}Se_{6})]·H_{2}O		monoclinic	C2/c	a=22.82 b=11.975 c=18.918 β=125.975°				
	[{Gd(en)_{3}}_{2}(μ-OH)_{2}]Sn_{2}Se_{6}		monoclinic	P2_{1}/n	a 9.993 b 11.842 c 15.313° β 99.979° Z=2	1784.6	2.643	yellow	
	[Hdien][Gd(dien)_{2}(μ-SnSe_{4})]		monoclinic	P2_{1}/c	a 10.300 b 9.426 c 13.875 β 101.678° Z=2	1319.3	2.271	red	
	[Gd(dap)_{4}]_{2}[Sn_{2}Se_{6}]Cl_{2}		monoclinic	P2_{1}/c	a=10.2385 b=14.1276 c=18.068 β =102.745°				
	[{Tb(en)_{3}}_{2}(μ-OH)_{2}]Sn_{2}Se_{6}	1423.62	monoclinic	P2_{1}/n	a=10.120 b=11.781 c=15.403 β=99.534° Z=2	1811.1	2.611		
bis(tetrakis(propane-1,2-diamine)-terbium) dichloride bis(μ-selenido)-tetrakis(selenido)-di-tin monohydrate	[Tb(dap)_{4}]_{2}[Sn_{2}Se_{6}]Cl_{2}·H_{2}O		monoclinic	P2_{1}/c	a=10.240 b=14.116 c=18.030 β=102.808°				
catena-[bis(μ_{2}-selenido)-(μ_{2}-hydroxo)-(N-(2-aminoethyl)-N'-(2-((2-aminoethyl)amino)ethyl)ethane-1,2-diamine)-selenido-dysprosium-tin]	[Dy_{2}(tepa)_{2}(μ-OH)_{2}Sn_{2}Se_{6}]		orthorhombic	Pbca	a=12.4132 b=13.5901 c=20.6722 Z=8		2.759	orange	
bis(bis(μ_{2}-hydroxo)-bis(N-(2-aminoethyl)-N'-(2-((2-aminoethyl)amino)ethyl)ethane-1,2-diamine)-dichloro-di-dysprosium) hexakis(μ_{2}-selenido)-tetrakis(selenido)-tetra-tin tetrahydrate	[Dy_{2}(tepa)_{2}(μ_{2}-OH)_{2}Cl_{2}]_{2}[Sn_{4}Se_{10}]·4H_{2}O		tetragonal	I4_{1}/a	a=28.2390 c=11.0380		2.229	yellow	
	[Dy_{2}(en)_{6}(μ_{2}-OH)_{2}][Sn_{2}Se_{6}]								
bis(tetrakis(propane-1,2-diamine)-dysprosium) dichloride bis(μ-selenido)-tetrakis(selenido)-di-tin monohydrate	[Dy(dap)_{4}]_{2}[Sn_{2}Se_{6}]Cl_{2}·H_{2}O		monoclinic	P2_{1}/c	a=10.214 b=14.118 c=18.000 β=102.798°				
bis(tetrakis(Propane-1,2-diamine)-holmium chloride) 1,3,2,4-diselenadistannetane-2,2,4,4-tetrakis(selenolate)	[Ho(dap)_{4}]_{2}[Sn_{2}Se_{6}]Cl_{2}		monoclinic	P2_{1}/c	a=10.1839 b=14.1303 c=18.0100 β=102.571° Z=4	2529.5		yellow	
bis(μ_{2}-Hydroxo)-tetrakis(diethylenetriamine)-di-holmium 1,3,2,4-diselenadistannetane-2,2,4,4-tetrakis(selenolate)	{[Ho(dien)_{2}]_{2}(μ_{2}-OH)_{2}}[Sn_{2}Se_{6}]		monoclinic	P2_{1}/n	a=12.0096 b=11.7181 c=13.7717 β=99.138° Z=2	1913.5	2.586	yellow	
bis(bis(N-(2-aminoethyl)-N'-(2-((2-aminoethyl)amino)ethyl)ethane-1,2-diamine)-dichloro-bis(μ-hydroxo)-di-holmium) tricyclo[3.3.1.1^{3,7}]tetrastannaselenane-1,3,5,7-tetrakis(selenolate) tetrahydrate	[Ho_{2}(tepa)_{2}(μ_{2}-OH)_{2}Cl_{2}]_{2}[Sn_{4}Se_{10}]·4H_{2}O		tetragonal	I4_{1}/a	a=28.076 c 10.948	8629.6	2.281	yellow; supertetrahedron	
catena-[bis(μ_{2}-selenido)-(μ_{2}-hydroxo)-(N-(2-aminoethyl)-N'-(2-((2-aminoethyl)amino)ethyl)ethane-1,2-diamine)-selenido-erbium-tin]	[Er_{2}(tepa)_{2}(μ-OH)_{2}Sn_{2}Se_{6}]		orthorhombic	Pbca	a=12.418 b=13.605 c=20.636 Z=8		2.778	orange	
bis(bis(μ_{2}-hydroxo)-bis(N-(2-aminoethyl)-N'-(2-((2-aminoethyl)amino)ethyl)ethane-1,2-diamine)-dichloro-di-erbium) hexakis(μ_{2}-selenido)-tetrakis(selenido)-tetra-tin tetrahydrate	[Er_{2}(tepa)_{2}(μ_{2}-OH)_{2}Cl_{2}]_{2}[Sn_{4}Se_{10}]·4H_{2}O		tetragonal	I4_{1}/a	a=28.1622 c=11.0089		2.261	yellow	
	[Er_{2}(en)_{6}(μ_{2}-OH)_{2}][Sn_{2}S_{6}]		monoclinic	P2_{1}/n	a 9.951 b 11.860 c 15.278 β 100.239°				
bis(tetrakis(propane-1,2-diamine)-erbium) dichloride bis(μ-selenido)-tetrakis(selenido)-di-tin monohydrate	[Er(dap)_{4}]_{2}[Sn_{2}Se_{6}]Cl_{2}·H_{2}O		monoclinic	P2_{1}/c	a=10.204 b=14.176 c=18.041 β=102.530°				
catena-[(μ-hydroxo)-bis(μ-selenido)-(N-(2-aminoethyl)-N'-(2-((2-aminoethyl)amino)ethyl)ethane-1,2-diamine)-selenido-tin-thulium	[Tm_{2}(tepa)_{2}(μ-OH)_{2}Sn_{2}Se_{6}]		orthorhombic	Pbca	a=12.399 b=13.518 c=20.504 Z=8		2.820	orange	
bis(bis(μ_{2}-hydroxo)-bis(N-(2-aminoethyl)-N'-(2-((2-aminoethyl)amino)ethyl)ethane-1,2-diamine)-dichloro-di-thulium) hexakis(μ_{2}-selenido)-tetrakis(selenido)-tetra-tin tetrahydrate	[Tm_{2}(tepa)_{2}(μ_{2}-OH)_{2}Cl_{2}]_{2}[Sn_{4}Se_{10}]·4H_{2}O		tetragonal	I4_{1}/a	a=28.2080 c=11.0142		2.258	yellow	
	[Hen]_{4}[Tm(en)_{4}]_{2}[Ag_{6}Sn_{6}S_{20}]·3en		monoclinic	C2/m	a 14.517 b 24.380 c 13.422 β 94.46°				
catena-((μ_{2}-Hydroxo)-bis(μ_{2}-selenido)-selenide-(tetraethylenepentamine)-tin-ytterbium hemihydrate)	[{Yb(tepa)(μ-OH)}_{2}(μ-1κ:2κ-Sn_{2}Se_{6})]·H_{2}O		monoclinic	C2/c	a=21.255 b=12.835 c=17.633 β=125.41°				
bis(μ_{2}-Hydroxo)-tetrakis(diethylenetriamine)-di-ytterbium bis(μ_{2}-selenido)-tetraselenido-di-tin	[{Yb(dien)_{2}}_{2}(μ-OH)_{2}]Sn_{2}Se_{6}		monoclinic	P2_{1}/n	a=12.026 b=11.666 c=13.819 β=98.971° Z=4				
DBU=1,8-diazabicyclo[5.4.0]undec-7-ene catena-(bis(2,3,4,6,7,8,9,10-Octahydropyrimido(1,2-a)azepin-1-ium) bis(μ_{3}-selenido)-pentakis(μ_{2}-selenido)-di-mercury)	[DBUH]_{2}[Hg_{2}Sn_{2}Se_{6}(Se_{2})]		triclinic	P1̅	a 10.390 b 12.244 c 13.977 α 86.58° β 79.51° γ 70.14° Z=2	1644.3	3.025	yellow	
catena-(bis(2,3,4,6,7,8,9,10-Octahydro-1H-pyrimido(1,2-a)azepin-5-ium) (μ_{3}-diselenido)-(μ_{3}-selenido)-pentakis(μ_{2}-selenido)-di-mercury-di-tin)	[DBUH]_{2}[Hg_{2}Sn_{2}Se_{5}(Se_{2})]		monoclinic	P2_{1}/c	a=14.7289 b=18.6045 c=13.5200 β=111.571	3445.33	3.040	red	
(tetrakis(2,3,4,6,7,8-Hexahydro-1H-pyrrolo[1,2-a]pyrimidin-5-ium) bis(μ_{3}-diselenido)-undecakis(μ_{2}-selenido)-tri-mercury-tetra-tin	[DBNH]_{4}[Hg_{3}Sn_{4}Se_{11}(Se_{2})_{2}]		monoclinic	C2/c	a 22.137 b 12.663 c 21.780° β 109.48°				
DBN=1,5-diazabicyclo[4.3.0]non-5-ene	[DBNH]_{2}[HgSnSe_{4}]		tetragonal	P4_{2}/ncm	a=12.8605 c 6.85560			band gap 2.46 eV	
	Li_{4}HgSn_{2}Se_{7}		monoclinic	Cc	a 18.286b 7.197 c 10.809 β 93.44°			red	
	Li_{2}HgSnSe_{4}		orthorhombic	Pna2_{1}	a=14.458 b=8.378 c=6.8215 Z=4	826.3	5.217	red; SHG 6.0 × AgGaS_{2}	
	Na_{2}HgSn_{2}Se_{6}		tetragonal	I4/mcm	a=7.8571 c=20.214				
	Na_{2}Hg_{3}Sn_{2}Se_{8}	1516.81	tetragonal	P4̅c2	a=9.3749 c=9.790 Z=2	860.5	5.854	red	
	K_{2}HgSnSe_{4}		tetragonal	I4/mcm	a=8.0531Å c=6.9501				
phen = 1,10-phenanthroline; eta = ethanolamine	[Fe(phen)_{3}]Hg_{2}Sn_{2}Se_{7}·1.5eta·0.25H_{2}O		triclinic	P1̅	a 13.0238 b 13.6275 c 14.4626 α 81.104° β 88.117° γ 82.840°				
teta = triethylenetetramine	[Ni_{2}(teta)_{2}(μ-teta)]HgSn_{3}Se_{9}		orthorhombic	Pmc2_{1}	a 22.731 b 13.2151 c 14.6495				
	SrHgSnSe_{4}		orthorhombic	Fdd2	a 21.9027 b 21.9059 c 13.5010			SHG 5 × AgGaS_{2}	
	Cs_{2}HgSn_{3}Se_{8}		orthorhombic	P2_{1}2_{1}2_{1}	a 7.9196 b 12.6657 c 18.5375				
	BaHgSnSe_{4}		orthorhombic	Fdd2	a 22.441 b 22.760 c 13.579			SHG 5 × AgGaS_{2}	
	Tl_{4}Sn_{2}Se_{6}							tetrahedral edge-shared pairs	
	TlGaSnSe_{4}		monoclinic	P2_{1}/c	a=7.501 b= 12.175 c= 18.203 β= 97.164 Z=8	1649.4	5.646	red	
	TlGaSnSe_{4}		cubic	Pa3̅	a=13.4755 Z=12	2447.0	5.770	red	
