= Selenidogermanate =

Type of chemical compound

Selenidogermanates are compounds with anions with selenium bound to germanium. They are analogous with germanates, thiogermanates, and telluridogermanates.

== List ==
name	formula	formula weight	crystal system	space group	cell dimensions	volume	density	comment	ref
	GeSe_{2}								
	Ge_{4}Se_{9}		orthorhombic	Pca2_{1}	a 17.8204 b 7.0029 c 12.0854				
	Li_{3}Ge_{3}Se_{6}		triclinic	P1̅	a 6.7728 b 8.6804 c 10.6300 α 74.519° β 76.334° γ 69.185°				
	[Li_{4}(H_{2}O)_{16}][Ge_{4}Se_{10}]·4.33H_{2}O		monoclinic	P2_{1}	a=10.2246 b=20.4503 c=28.7242 β=97.850°				
	{Li_{4}(thf)_{12}}Ge_{4}Se_{10}		monoclinic	C2/c	a=24.845 b =12.692 c=25.625 β=119.00°				
	[Li_{2}(H_{2}O)_{8}][MnGe_{4}Se_{10}]		tetragonal	I4̅	a=9.103 c =15.130				
	[NH_{4}]_{2}[H_{2}N(CH_{3})_{2}]_{2}Ge_{2}Se_{6}		monoclinic	P2_{1}/n	a 13.503 b 7.777 c 19.583 β 106.03°				
	(N_{2}H_{5})_{4}Ge_{2}Se_{6}		tetragonal	I4_{1}cd	a = 12.708 c = 21.955 Z = 8				
	[NEt_{4}]_{2}[enH]_{2}[Ge_{2}Se_{6}]		triclinic	P1̅	a = 7.805, b = 10.747, c = 11.445, α = 110.33°, β = 97.19°, γ = 92.62° V =	889.0			
	tetrakis(Tripropylammonium) hexakis(μ_{2}-selenido)-tetrakis(selenoxo)-tetra-germanium(iv)		monoclinic	P2_{1}/c	a 18.759 b 16.104 c 21.211 β 108.52°				
	(C_{2}C_{1}Im)_{4}[Ge_{4}Se_{10}]	1524.63	tetragonal	P42/n	a=13.675 c=12.042 Z=2	2251.9	2.249	yellowish	
1-Ethyl-3-methyl-imidazolium	(C_{2}C_{1}Im)_{6}[Ge_{8}Se_{19}];	2747.96	triclinic	P1̅	a=10.2607 b=17.6852 c=21.994 α=100.889 β= 95.600 γ=105.240 Z=2	3735.5	2.443	yellowish	
	(C_{2}C_{1}Im)_{6}[Ge_{8}Se_{19}]	2747.96	monoclinic	P12_{1}/c1	a=22.206 b=9.544 c=36.823 β=105.37 Z=4	7524.8	2.426	yellow	
	(C_{2}C_{1}Im)_{8}[Ge_{16}Se_{36}]	4893.34	monoclinic	C12/c1	a=20.527 b=28.744 c=19.720 β=94.640 Z=4	11597	2.803	yellow	
	2(C_{2}C_{1}Im)_{6}[Ge_{12}Se_{27}]	7340.01	monoclinic	P12_{1}/n1	a=14.834 b=30.647 c=20.465 β=107.603 Z=2	8868	2.749	red	
	(C_{4}C_{1}im)^{+}_{2}{[Sn^{II}(Ge^{IV}_{4}Se_{10})]^{2−}}		monoclinic	P2_{1}/n	a 9.9685 b 26.2588 c 13.9736 β 98.766°				
	Na_{2}GeSe_{3}		monoclinic	P2_{1}/c	a =7.097 b=16.068 c=6.073 β =113.69° Z=4		3.72	yellow	
	Na_{4}GeSe_{4}		orthorhombic	Pnma	a = 28.518 b=9.447 c=7.128 Z=8			orange-yellow	
	Na_{4}[Ge_{4}Se_{10}]		orthorhombic	Cmcm	a=13.507 b=13.363 c=11.034 Z=4	1881.6			
	Na_{4}Ge(Se_{2})_{4}							red	
	Na_{6}Ge_{2}Se_{6}		monoclinic	P2_{1}	a = 8.367 b = 11.924 c = 8.158 β = 118.6°				
	Na_{6}Ge_{2}Se_{7}		monoclinic	C2/c	a=9.451 b=10.914 c=15.874 β=104.7°		3.51	yellow	
	Na_{8}Ge_{4}Se_{10}		triclinic	P1̅	a = 7.074 b = 8.098 c = 10.657 α = 73.4° β = 70.8° γ= 81.7°				
	Na_{8}Ge_{4}Se_{10}		monoclinic	P2_{1}/c	a = 13.104 b=12.057 c=14.101 β= 92.9° Z=4		3.77	orange yellow	
	[Na_{4}(H_{2}O)_{14}][GeSe_{4}]		monoclinic	C2	a = 12.862, b = 11.205, c = 8.141 Å, β = 107.40°				
	Na_{4}Ge_{2}Se_{6} · 16 H_{2}O		monoclinic	P2_{1}/c	a = 9.894 b = 11.781 c = 12.225 β = 92.90° Z = 2				
	Na_{6}Ge_{2}Se_{6} · 4 CH_{3}OH								
	Na_{3}GeSe_{3}Br								
	Mg_{2}GeSe_{4}	437.05	orthorhombic	Pnma	a 13.50 b 7.85 c 6.37 Z=4	675	4.302	yellow	
	Li_{2}MgGeSe_{4}		orthorhombic	Pmn2_{1}	a = 8.2961 b = 7.0069 c = 6.6116, Z = 2	384.33	3.686	yellow	
	Na_{4}MgGe_{2}Se_{6}	735.21	monoclinic	C2	a 7.722 b 11.994 c 7.096 β 106.66° Z=2	629.7	3.878	orange-yellow	
	K_{2}GeSe_{4}		monoclinic	P2_{1}/c	a=11.989 b=8.275 c=8.915 β=106.38° Z=4	848.8	3.65	orange	
	K_{2}Ge_{4}Se_{8}		monoclinic	P2_{1}/c	a=7.3752 b=12.239 c=17.468 β=96.102°, Z=4	1156.8		band gap 1.8 eV	
	K_{4}[GeSe_{4}]		cubic	P4̅3n	a=13.1893				
	[K_{4}(H_{2}O)_{4}][GeSe_{4}]		triclinic	P1̅	a 7.8695 b 7.9576 c 12.314, α 80.24° β 87.66° γ 74.07°				
	[K_{4}(H_{2}O)_{3}][Ge_{2}Se_{6}]		monoclinic	P2_{1}/c	a 14.583 b 8.3858 c 14.17 β 96.27°				
	[K_{4}(H_{2}O)_{3}][Ge_{4}Se_{10}]								
	K_{6}Ge_{2}Se_{6}		monoclinic	C2/c	a=9.076 b=12.851 c=8.480 β=116.76°				
	[V(en)_{2}(ea)]_{2}[Ge_{2}Se_{6}]		monoclinic	P2_{1}/n	a 8.733 b 13.432 c 13.583 β 91.486° Z=4	1592.8	2.256	red	
	[V(teta)(ea)]_{2}[Ge_{2}Se_{6}]		monoclinic	P2_{1}/n	a 9.0574 b 14.209 c 13.1189° β 91.384° Z=4	1687.8	2.232	red	
	[V_{2}(en)_{6}(μ-O)][Ge_{2}Se_{6}]		triclinic	P1̅	a 9.448 b 10.178 c 10.436 α 109.090° β 104.169° γ 111.520° Z=1	802.7	2.271	brown	
	Na_{2}MnGe_{2}Se_{6}	1439.72	tetragonal	I4/mcm	a = 7.772 c = 19.077 Z = 2	1152.3	4.150	@153K band gap 1.93 eV; brown	
	Na_{8}Mn_{2}(Ge_{2}Se_{6})_{2}		monoclinic	C2	a 7.727 b 11.943 c 7.085 β 106.682°			band gap 1.95 eV	
	K_{2}MnGe_{2}Se_{6}		tetragonal	I4/mcm	a =8.1315 c =18.877				
	[Mn(en)_{3}]_{2}Ge_{2}Se_{6}		monoclinic	P2_{1}/n	a 9.058 b 16.319 c 11.628 β 92.264°				
	(enH_{2})[{Mn(en)_{2}(enH)}_{2}(μ-en)](Ge_{2}Se_{7})_{2}		orthorhombic	Pbca	a 15.816 b 13.638 c 24.677				
	[Mn(dien)_{2}]_{2}Ge_{2}Se_{7}		monoclinic	P2_{1}/c	a 16.489 b 14.524 c 15.860 β 101.03°				
	[{Mn(tepa)}_{2}(μ-Ge_{2}Se_{6})]		tetragonal	I 4_{1}/a	a=26.387 c 9.9435				
	[K_{2}(H_{2}O)_{3}][MnGe_{4}Se_{10}]		tetragonal	I4̅	a=8.988 c=15.49				
Bis(trimethylammonium) decaselenidotetragermanatomanganate(II)	[(CH_{3})_{3}NH]_{2}[MnGe_{4}Se_{10}]		tetragonal	I4̅	a 9.559 c 14.808				
	[Fe(dien)_{2}]_{2}Ge_{2}Se_{6}		monoclinic	P2_{1}/n	a 12.426 b 9.312 c 15.385 β 101.422°				
	[{Fe(tepa)}_{2}(μ-Ge_{2}Se_{6})]		tetragonal	I 4_{1}/a	a 26.285 c 9.882				
	K_{2}FeGe_{3}Se_{8}		monoclinic	P2_{1}	a 7.409 b 12.268 c 34.974 β 96.04°			band gap 1.95 eV	
	[Ni(dien)_{2}]_{2}Ge_{2}Se_{5}(Se_{2})		monoclinic	P2_{1}/c	a 15.741 b 14.463 c 16.390 β 103.03°				
	[{Ni(tepa)}_{2}(μ-Ge_{2}Se_{6})]		tetragonal	I4_{1}/a	a=26.001 c=9.708				
triethylenetetramine	[Ni(teta)_{2}]_{2}Ge_{4}Se_{10}·0.5H_{2}O		monoclinic	P2_{1}/c	a 21.202 b 13.345 c 20.872 β 107.46°				
	(enH_{2})_{5}[Cu_{16}Ge_{6}Se_{19}(Se_{2})_{6}]·en		cubic	Pa3̅	a=a 20.8113 Z=12				
	[(CH_{3})_{2}NH_{2}]_{6}[Cu_{8}Ge_{6}Se_{19}]·0.25H_{2}O			Im3̅	a=22.43070				
	[NH_{3}CH_{3}]_{0.75}Cu_{1.25}GeSe_{3}		tetragonal	P4̅2_{1}m	a=12.9345 c 8.9057				
decakis(1-ethyl-3-methyl-1H-imidazol-3-ium) hexakis(μ-cyanido)-nonatriacontakis(μ-selenido)-selenido-hepta-copper(i)-hexadeca-germanium(iv)-penta-sodium	(C_{2}C_{1}Im)_{10}[Na_{5}(CN)_{6}@Cu_{6}(Ge_{4}Se_{10})_{4}(Cu)]		triclinic	P1̅	a 19.2790 b 20.4268 c 23.2357 α 105.275° β 93.657° γ 115.206° Z=2	7822.6	2.610	red	
decakis(1-ethyl-3-methyl-1H-imidazol-3-ium) hexakis(μ-cyanido)-nonatriacontakis(μ-selenido)-selenido-hepta-copper(i)-hexadeca-germanium(iv)-penta-sodium	(C_{2}C_{1}Im)_{10}[Na_{5}(CN)_{6}@Cu_{6}(Ge_{4}Se_{10})_{4}(Cu)]	6147.36	triclinic	P1̅	a 20.3454 b 20.8202 c 23.120 α 72.172° β 68.184° γ 60.802° Z=2	7842.1	2.472	red	
1,2-dap = 1,2-diaminopropane	[Mn(1,2-dap)_{2}][Cu_{2}GeSe_{5}]		monoclinic	P2_{1}/c	a 6.673 b 18.210 c 15.070 β 96.078°				
	[Cu_{2}GeSe_{5}][Mn(Hen)_{2}(en)]		monoclinic	P2_{1}/c	a 9.6327 b 20.6934 c 10.3704 β 100.646°			band gap 1.69 eV	
tren = tris(2-aminoethyl)amine	[Ni(tren)(en)]_{2}∙[Cu_{2}GeSe_{5}]_{2}		orthorhombic	P2_{1}2_{1}2_{1}	a 9.8574 b 13.0311 c 32.77				
	[Ni(dien)_{2}]_{2}Ge_{2}Se_{5}(Se_{2})		monoclinic	P2_{1}/c	a=15.741 b=14.463 c=16.390 β=103.03(3)°				
	{Ni(tepa)}_{2}(μ-Ge_{2}Se_{6})		tetragonal	I4_{1}/a	a=26.001 c=9.7079				
	[NH_{3}CH_{3}]_{0.75}Cu_{1.25}GeSe_{3}		tetragonal	P4̅2_{1}m	a 12.9345 c 8.9057				
	Na_{2}ZnGe_{2}Se_{6}		tetragonal	I4/mcm	a 7.757 c 18.734			band gap 2.36 eV	
	Cu_{2}ZnGeSe_{4}		tetragonal	I4				band gap 1.38; air stable; SHG 43 pm/V at λ = 2900 nm	
	Cu_{4}ZnGe_{2}Se_{7}		monoclinic	C2	a 12.3443 b 5.6195 c 8.7904 β 98.693°			band gap 0.91 eV; air stable	
N-(2-aminoethyl)piperazine	(H_{2}NC_{4}H_{8}NCH_{2}CH_{2}NH_{2})(HNCH_{2}CH_{2}NH_{2})_{3}Zn_{2}Ge_{2}Se_{8}		orthorhombic	P2_{1}2_{1}2	a=18.928 b=30.849 c=6.3954				
	[NH_{4}]_{2}Ga_{4}Se_{8}Ge_{4}		monoclinic	P2_{1}/c					
	NaGaGe_{3}Se_{8}		monoclinic	P2_{1}/c	a 7.233 b 11.889 c 17.550 β 101.75° Z=4	1477.5	4.235	orange	
	K_{2}Ga_{2}Ge_{2}Se_{8}		monoclinic	P2_{1}/c	a 7.3552 b 12.4151 c 17.6213 β 97.026° Z=4	1597.02	4.136	yellow	
	K_{3}Ga_{3}Ge_{7}Se_{20}	2413.79	monoclinic	P2_{1}/c	a 7.0520 b 39.033 c 6.9488 β 90.433° Z=2	1912.67	4.191	orange	
	K_{3}Ga_{3}(Ge_{4.95}Si_{2.05})Se_{20}		monoclinic	Pc	a 7.0101 b 38.928 c 6.9594 β 90.531°				
	Rb_{2}GeSe_{4}	559.4	monoclinic	P2/m	a=7.390 b=3.704 c=8.623 β=104.87 Z=1	228.1	4.07	orange-brown	
	Rb_{4}Ge_{4}Se_{10}		monoclinic	C2/c	a = 16.095 b = 16.09 c = 9.390 β= 105.79°				
	Rb_{4}Ge_{4}Se_{12}		orthorhombic	Pna2_{1}	a 14.870 b 13.800 c 12.445 Z=4	2554	4.109	red	
	Rb_{4}Ge_{4}Se_{10} • CH_{3}OH	1453.9	monoclinc	C2	a=17.099 b=9.287 c=9.503 β=118.49 Z=2	1326.3	3.64	yellow	
	Rb_{2}MnGe_{3}Se_{8}		orthorhombic	P2_{1}2_{1}2_{1}	a 7.2756 b 12.1668 c 16.8351				
	Rb_{2}[MnGe_{4}Se_{10}]·3H_{2}O		tetragonal						
	Rb_{3}(AlSe_{2})_{3}(GeSe_{2})_{7}		monoclinic	P2_{1}/c	a = 7.0580 b = 39.419 c = 7.0412 β = 90.360° Z = 2			#190K; band gap 2.4 eV	
	RbGaGeSe_{4}		orthorhombic	Pnma	a=17.5750 b= 7.4718 c= 12.4449 Z=8	1634.23	4.419	colourless; air sensitive	
	γ-Sr_{2}GeSe_{4}		orthorhombic	Ama2	a = 10.284 b = 10.543 c = 7.411 Z=4				
Strontium Selenogermanate(III)	Sr_{2}Ge_{2}Se_{5}		monoclinic	P2_{1}/n	a=8.445 b=12.302 c=9.179 β=93.75° Z=4			Ge-Ge bond	
	SrZnGeSe_{4}		orthorhombic	Fdd2	a=21.741 b=21.399 c=12.799 Z=32	5954.9	4.831	IR edge 31.25 μm; SHG 4.7 × AgGaS_{2}; band gap 1.92 eV	
tepa=tetraethylenepentamine	(H_{2}peha)[Y_{2}(μ-OH)_{2}(tepa)_{2}Cl_{2}]{[Y_{2}(μ-OH)_{2}(tepa)_{2}Cl]_{2}(μ-Ge_{2}Se_{6})}[Ge_{2}Se_{6}]Cl_{2}		triclinic	P1̅	a 9.1861 b 17.3698 c 19.5422 α 103.218° β 95.414° γ 101.439°				
	Y_{2}(tepa)_{2}(μ-OH)_{2}(μ-Ge_{2}Se_{6})]·H_{2}O		monoclinic	C2/c	a 21.87 b 12.245 c 18.724 β 127.58°				
	Ag_{x}Na_{(6-x)}Ge_{2}Se_{7} x=1.76								
	Ag_{x}Na_{(8-x)}Ge_{4}Se_{10}			C2/c					
	K_{2}Ag_{2}GeSe_{4}		orthorhombic	Fddd	a 6.613 b 13.776 c 21.822				
	Ag_{2}FeGeSe_{4}		orthorhombic						
	AgGaGeSe_{4}		tetragonal	I4̅2d	a = 5.8056 c = 10.349	348.81		band gap 2.27 eV	
	Rb_{2}Ag_{2}GeSe_{4}	1579.76	orthorhombic	Fddd	a 6.5943 b 13.9740 c 22.627				
	RbAg_{3}Ga_{8}Se_{14}		monoclinic	Cm	a 12.9155 b 11.7376 c 9.6693 β 116.367°				
	Ag_{2}Sr_{3}Ge_{2}Se_{8}		cubic	I4̅3d					
	Rb_{3}[AgGe_{4}Se_{10}]·2H_{2}O								
	Li_{7}Cd_{4.5}Ge_{4}Se_{16}		orthorhombic	Pna2_{1}	a 14.165 b 8.2990 c 6.6869			band gap 2.18 eV; melt 985K	
	Na_{2}CdGe_{2}Se_{6}		monoclinic	Cc	a 7.589 b 13.182 c 12.069 β 98.829°			SHG 2×AgGaS_{2} at 2.09 μm	
	K_{2}CdGe_{3}Se_{8}	1040.05	monoclinic	P2_{1}	a=7.6069 b=12.4016 c=17.6585 β=95.306° Z=4	1658.71	4.165	brownish yellow	
	SrCdGeSe_{4}		orthorhombic	Ama2	a = 10.8245 b = 10.6912 c = 6.6792 Z=4			red; band gap 1.9 eV; melt 851; SHG 5× AgGaS_{2}	
	[NH_{4}]_{2}In_{4}Se_{8}Ge_{4}		monoclinic	P2_{1}/c	a 7.642 b 12.470 c 18.222 β 95.214°				
	KInGeSe_{4}		monoclinic	P2_{1}/c	a=7.6108 b=12.4473 c=18.0896 β=97.238° Z=8	1700.0	4.239	yellow	
	RbInGeSe_{4}		orthorhombic	Pnma	a=17.9948 b=7.6908 c=12.6003 Z=8	1743.8	4.475	yellow	
	K_{3}Ga_{3}(Ge_{6.17}Sn_{0.83})Se_{20}		monoclinic	Pc	a 7.0843 b 39.404 c 7.0212 β 90.567°				
	Na_{9}Sb(Ge_{2}Se_{6})_{2}		monoclinic	C2/c	a = 8.95 b = 24.33 c = 7.066 β = 122.10° Z=2	1303	3.992	red	
	Sr_{3}GeSb_{2}Se_{8}		orthorhombic	Pnma	a = 12.633 b = 4.301 c = 28.693 Z = 4	1558.8		band gap 0.75 eV	
	Cs_{4}Ge_{2}Se_{6}		monoclinic	P2_{1}/n	a 7.6295 b 9.6884 c 19.773 β=98.78°				
	Cs_{4}Ge_{2}Se_{8}	1308.5	monoclinic	C2	a=17.503 b=9.549 c=9.751 β=118.16° Z=2	1436.8	3.87	orange-yellow	
	Cs_{4}Ge_{4}Se_{10}		monoclinic	C2/c	a = 16.348 b = 16.49 c = 9.771 β = 107.10°				
	Cs_{4}Ge_{4}Se_{10} · 2CH_{3}OH	1675.7	monoclinic	C2/m	a=15.278 b=7.624 c=10.090 β=121.71° Z=2	999.8	4.34	yellow	
	Cs_{4}Ge_{4}Se_{12}	1769.52	orthorhombic	Pna2_{1}	a 15.193 b 13.944 c 12.845 Z=4	2721.4	4.319	red	
	(C_{4}C_{1}C_{1}im)^{+}_{7}{[Cs@Sn^{II}_{4}(Ge^{IV}_{4}Se_{10})_{4}]^{7−}}		cubic	P4̅3m	a=15.446			Cs in a tetrahedron	
heptakis(1-ethyl-3-methyl-1H-imidazol-3-ium) hexatriacontakis(μ-selenido)-tetraselenido-cesium-tetra-germanium(ii)-hexadeca-germanium(iv)	(C_{2}C_{1}Im)_{7}[Cs@Ge^{II}_{4}(Ge^{IV}_{4}Se_{10})_{4}]	4831.2	orthorhombic	P2_{1}2_{1}2_{1}	a 18.1595 b 18.5017 c 36.632 Z=4	12307.8	2.980	yellow	
	Cs_{2}MgGe_{3}Se_{8}		orthorhombic	P2_{1}2_{1}2_{1}	a 7.6635 b 12.7242 c 17.7724				
	Cs[Cr(en)_{2}GeSe_{4}]	693.57	monoclinic	P2_{1}/n	a=11.3115 b=12.3519 c=11.4514 β =93.359 Z=4	1597.2	2.884	black	
	Cs_{2}MnGe_{3}Se_{8}		orthorhombic	P2_{1}2_{1}2_{1}	a 7.6376 b 12.648 c 17.762				
	Cs_{2}[MnGe_{4}Se_{10}]·3H_{2}O		tetragonal						
	Cs_{2}Cu_{2}GeSe_{4}		monoclinic	C2/c	a 7.8231 b 23.953 c 6.0197 β 113.75°				
	Cs_{2}ZnGe_{3}Se_{8}		orthorhombic	P2_{1}2_{1}2_{1}	a 7.5756 b 12.6191 c 17.6543				
	CsGaGeSe_{4}		orthorhombic	Pnma	a= 17.7666 b= 7.5171 c= 12.6383 Z=8	1687.9	4.652	colourless	
	Cs_{2}Ge_{3}Ga_{6}Se_{14}			P3̅m_{1}	a = 7.6396 c =13.5866 Z = 1	686.72		dark red	
	(Cs_{6}Cl)_{2}Cs_{5}[Ga_{15}Ge_{9}Se_{48}]		tetragonal	I4/m	a 14.3870 c 28.012				
	[Cs_{6}Cl][Ga_{5}GeQ_{12}]							band gap 2.89 eV; porous layers	
	(Cs_{6}Br)_{2}Cs_{5}[Ga_{15}Ge_{9}Se_{48}]		tetragonal	I4/m	a 14.3806 c 27.934				
	(Cs_{6}I_{0.6}Cl_{0.5})_{2}Cs_{5}[Ga_{15}Ge_{9}Se_{48}]		tetragonal	I4/m	a 14.4267 c 28.082				
	(Cs_{5}KCl)_{2}Cs_{5}[Ga_{15}Ge_{9}Se_{48}]		tetragonal	I4/m	a=14.3309 c=27.797				
	(Rb_{6}Cl)_{2}Cs_{5}[Ga_{15}Ge_{9}Se_{48}]		tetragonal	I4/m	a=14.2193 c=27.410 Z=2	5542			
	(Rb_{6}Br)_{2}Cs_{5}[Ga_{15}Ge_{9}Se_{48}]		tetragonal	I4/m	a=14.4034 c=27.598 Z=2	5646.3			
	Cs_{3}AsGeSe_{5}		monoclinic	C2/m	a 14.252 b 7.4 c 10.335 β 124.07°				
	CsAg_{3}Ga_{8}Se_{14}		monoclinic	Cm	a 12.9694 b 11.7931 c 9.7011 β 116.805°				
	Cs_{3}[AgGe_{4}Se_{10}]·2H_{2}O								
	Cs_{2}CdGe_{3}Se_{8}		orthorhombic	P2_{1}2_{1}2_{1}	7.7048 b 12.6822 c 17.8208				
	Cs_{2}Ge_{3}In_{6}Se_{14}			R3̅m	a = 7.9951 c = 41.726			band gap 2.08 eV	
	Ba_{2}Ge_{2}Se_{5}		orthorhombic	Pnma	a=12.594 b=9.174 c=9.160 Z=4				
	[Ba_{2}(H_{2}O)_{9}][GeSe_{4}]	825.25	orthorhombic	Pbca	a 13.916 b 15.097 c 16.116 Z=8	3385.9	3.238	light yellow	
	Ba_{6}Ge_{2}Se_{12}		monoclinic	P2_{1}/c	a = 10.0903 b = 9.3640 c = 25.7643 β = 90.303°				
	Ba_{7}Ge_{2}Se_{17}		orthorhombic	Pnma	a = 12.652 b = 20.069 c = 12.3067				
	Ba_{4}Ge_{3}Se_{9}Cl_{2}			P6_{3}	a 10.0924 b 10.0924 c 12.512				
	Ba_{3}[Mn_{6}Ge_{4}Se_{17}]·19H_{2}O	2716.66	triclinic	P1̅	a 12.184 b 15.089 c 15.868 α 88.73° β 73.68° γ 71.06° Z=2	2640.4	3.412	red	
	Ba_{3}[Mn_{6}Ge_{4}Se_{17}]·30H_{2}O		rhombohedral	R3̅c	a 20.463 c 25.11 Z=6	9109	3.188	orange-red	
	BaCu_{2}GeSe_{4}			P3_{1}21	a 6.5014 c 16.266			red	
	BaZnGeSe_{4}		orthorhombic	Ama2	a = 11.3255 b = 11.2527 c = 6.2917			band gap 2.46 eV	
	LiBa_{4}Ga_{5}Se_{12}		orthorhombic	P4̅2_{1}c	a 13.0056 b 13.0056 c 6.2671			band gap 2.44 eV	
	Ba_{4}Ge_{3}Se_{9}Br_{2}		hexagonal	P6_{3}	a = 10.2345 c = 12.5306				
	BaCdGeSe_{4}		orthorhombic	Fdd2	a=22.167 b=22.768 c=13.303			band gap 1.67 eV; SHG 0.5 × AgGaS_{2}	
	Ba_{4}GeSb_{2}Se_{11}	1734.01	orthorhombic	Cmc2_{1}	a = 9.37 b = 25.85, c = 8.80 Z=4	2131	5.404		
	La_{4}Ge_{3}Se_{2}S_{10}		rhombohedral	R3c	a=19.5575 c=8.1468	2698.6	4.605	Yellow-orange	
	La_{4}Ge_{3}Se_{4}S_{8}		rhombohedral	R3c		2745.3		Yellow-orange	
	La_{4}Ge_{3}Se_{6}S_{6}		rhombohedral	R3c		2792.6		orange	
	La_{4}Ge_{3}Se_{8}S_{4}		rhombohedral	R3c		2845.3		red	
	La_{4}Ge_{3}Se_{10}S_{2}		rhombohedral	R3c		2912.1		red	
lanthanum(III) bis[hexaselenodigermanate]	Na_{9}La[Ge_{2}Se_{6}]_{2}		monoclinic	C12/m1	a =7.974 b=12.337 c=7.114 β=107.101° Ζ=1	669.0		orange	
	Ba_{4}LaSbGe_{3}Se_{13}		monoclinic	P2_{1}/c	a=16.3330 b=12.5115 c=13.0321 β=103.457° Z=4	2590.0		red; band gap 2.0 eV	
	[Ce_{4}(tepa)_{4}(μ-GeSe_{4})(μ-GeSe_{5})(μ-Ge_{2}Se_{6})		triclinic	P1̅	a 12.273 b 16.624 c 18.281 α 91.264° β 101.034° γ 96.497°				
	KCeGeSe_{4}		monoclinic	P2_{1}	a = 6.852 b = 7.025 c = 9.017 β = 108.116° Z = 2				
	Pr(teta)(tren)Cl]_{2}[Ge_{2}Se_{6}](en)		triclinic	P1̅	a 10.3153 b 10.4707 c 14.0511 α 99.606° β 92.679° γ 119.146°				
	Nd(teta)(tren)Cl]_{2}[Ge_{2}Se_{6}](en)		triclinic	P1̅	a 10.2840 b 10.4774 c 14.0341 α 99.655° β 92.651° γ 119.161°				
	Na_{9}Sm(Ge_{2}Se_{6})_{2}		monoclinic	C2/m	a = 7.916 b = 12.244 c = 7.105 β = 106.99° Z = 1	658.6			
	Sm_{2}(μ-OH)_{2}(tepa)_{2}(μ-Ge_{2}Se_{6})		monoclinic	P2_{1}/n	a 12.10 b 11.41 c 12.71 β 92.81°				
	Sm(teta)(tren)Cl]_{2}[Ge_{2}Se_{6}](en)		triclinic	P1̅	a 10.3327 b 10.482 c 14.003 α 77.816° β 87.499° γ 60.62°				
	NaSmGeSe_{4}·0.25Na_{2}Se		monoclinic	C2/c	a 22.508 b 11.0307 c 6.8261 β 103.038°				
	KSmGeSe_{4}		monoclinic	P2_{1}	a = 6.774 b = 6.994 c = 8.960 β = 108.225° Z = 2	403.2			
	RbSmGeSe_{4}		orthorhombic	P2_{1}2_{1}2_{1}	a = 6.7347 b = 7.0185 c = 17.723 Z=4	837.7			
	CsSmGeSe		orthorhombic	P2_{1}2_{1}2_{1}	a=6.707 b=7.067 c=18.334 Z=4	869.1			
	Eu_{2}GeSe_{4}		monoclinic	P2_{1}	a = 6.964 b = 7.055 c = 8.400 β = 108.12° Z = 2			deep red	
	Eu_{2}GeSe_{4}		monoclinic	P2_{1}/m	a = 6.969 b = 7.059 c = 8.516 β = 107.99° Z = 2			@673K	
	Eu_{2}Ge_{2}Se_{5}		monoclinic	P2_{1}/n	a = 8.421 b = 12.235 c = 9.127 β = 93.67° Z = 4			deep red	
	{Eu(en)_{3}}_{2}(μ-OH)_{2}]Ge_{2}Se_{6}		monoclinic	P2_{1}/n	a 10.062 b 11.538 c 15.227 β 98.470°				
	Eu(teta)(tren)Cl]_{2}[Ge_{2}Se_{6}](en)		triclinic	P1̅	a 10.364 b 10.549 c 14.1157 α 77.299° β 87.606° γ 60.697°				
	{Eu(tepa)(μ-OH)}_{2}(μ-Ge_{2}Se_{8})		monoclinic	P2_{1}/n	a 12.384 b 11.697 c 12.965 β 94.107°				
	Na_{2}EuGeSe_{4}		cubic	I4̅3m	a=7.3466 Z=2				
	Na_{0.75}Eu_{1.625}GeSe_{4}		cubic	I4̅3d	a=14.7065 Z=16				
	[Eu_{7}Cl_{2}][Ge_{6}Se_{18}]		hexagonal	P6_{3}/cm	a=12.911 c=12.722 Z=2	1836.6	5.409		
	K_{2}EuGeSe_{5}		monoclinic	P2_{1}/c	a = 11.8056 b = 9.9630 c = 8.9456 β = 91.195° Z = 4	1051.9	4.404	@167K; band gap 1.84 eV; Eu(II)	
	EuCdGeSe_{4}		orthorhombic	Ama2	a 10.7525 b 10.6275 c 6.6740 Z=4	762.6	5.685	red; band gap 2.25 eV; SHG 3.8 × AgGaS_{2}	
	Gd(teta)(tren)Cl]_{2}[Ge_{2}Se_{6}](en)		triclinic	P1̅	a 10.310 b 10.495 c 14.055 α 77.50° β 87.51° γ 60.81°				
	{Gd(tepa)(μ-OH)}_{2}(μ-Ge_{2}Se_{8})		monoclinic	P2_{1}/n	a 12.316 b 11.667 c 12.868 β 93.70°				
	{Dy(tepa)(μ-OH)}_{2}(μ-Ge_{2}Se_{8})		monoclinic	P2_{1}/n	a 12.329 b 11.627 c 12.882 β 94.177°				
	[{Dy(en)_{3}}_{2}(μ-OH)_{2}]Ge_{2}Se_{6}				a 10.026 b 11.526 c 15.147 β 99.030°				
	Tb_{2}(tepa)_{2}(μ-OH)_{2}(μ-Ge_{2}Se_{8})		monoclinic	P2_{1}/n	a 12.228 b 11.587 c 12.782 β 93.458°				
	Tb(teta)(tren)Cl]_{2}[Ge_{2}Se_{6}](en)		triclinic	P1̅	a 10.2303 b 10.4499 c 14.0083 α 99.655° β 92.737° γ 119.069°				
	[Tb_{2}(tepa)_{2}(μ-OH)_{2}(μ-Ge_{2}Se_{6})]·0.5H_{2}O		monoclinic	C2/c	a 22.007 b 12.3363 c 18.2590 β 125.196°				
	[{Ho(en)_{3}}_{2}(μ-OH)_{2}]Ge_{2}Se_{6}		monoclinic	P2_{1}/n	a 9.997 b 11.550 c 15.109 β 99.289°				
	[{Ho(dien)_{2}}_{2}(μ-OH)_{2}]Ge_{2}Se_{6}		monoclinic	P2_{1}/n	a 11.920 b 11.583 c 13.691 β 98.154°				
	Ho_{2}(μ-OH)_{2}(tepa)_{2}(μ-Ge_{2}Se_{6})		orthorhombic	Pbca	a 12.1791 b 13.487 c 20.346				
	(H_{2}peha)[Er_{2}(μ-OH)_{2}(tepa)_{2}Cl_{2}]{[Er_{2}(μ-OH)_{2}(tepa)_{2}Cl]_{2}(μ-Ge_{2}Se_{6})}[Ge_{2}Se_{6}]Cl_{2}		triclinic	P1̅	a 9.1544 b 17.382 c 19.443, α 102.994° β 95.306° γ 101.406°				
	(H_{3}O)[Tm(teta)_{2}][Ge_{2}Se_{6}]		orthorhombic	Pccn	a 13.7846 b 14.3998 c 17.9221				
	Tm_{2}(tepa)_{2}(μ-OH)_{2}(μ-Ge_{2}Se_{6})		orthorhombic	Pbca	a 12.1702 b 13.528 c 20.281				
	Li_{2}HgGeSe_{4}	602.90	orthorhombic	Pna2_{1}	a=14.150 b=8.260 c=6.692 Z=4	782.2	5.119	yellow	
	Na_{2}Hg_{3}Ge_{2}Se_{8}	1424.61	tetragonal	P4̅c2	a=9.1938 c=9.5437 Z=2	806.69	5.865	red	
	SrHgGeSe_{4}		orthorhombic	Ama2	a 10.8375 b 10.7456 c 6.6377			NLO 5 × AgGaS_{2}	
	BaHgGeSe_{4}		orthorhombic	Ama2	a 11.255 b 11.033 c 6.685			NLO 5 × AgGaS_{2}	
	EuHgGeSe_{4}		orthorhombic	Ama2	a 10.6530 b 10.5990 c 6.5986			band gap; SHG 3.1 × AgGaS_{2}	
	TlGaGeSe_{4}		orthorhombic	Pnma	a= 17.4742 b= 7.4105 c= 11.9406 Z=8	1546.22	5.692	red	
	Tl_{2}Ga_{2}GeSe_{6}		tetragonal	I4/mmc	a = 8.0770 c = 6.2572 Z = 4				
	TlInGeSe_{4}	702	monoclinic	P2_{1}/c	a= 7.586 b= 12.134 c=18.023 β= 96.037° Z=8	1649.8	5.653	yellow	
	TlInGe_{2}Se_{6}		trigonal	R3	a = 10.1798 c = 9.2872			band gap 2.38 eV	
	α-Pb_{2}GeSe_{4}								
	Na_{0.5}Pb_{1.75}GeSe_{4}		cubic	I4̅3d	a = 14.662				
	PbGa_{2}GeSe_{6}							melt 687 °C; phase transition 522 °C	
	Pb_{4}Ga_{4}GeSe_{12}								
	Pb_{3}Ga_{2}GeSe_{8}			P4̅2_{1}c				melt incongruently 656 °C	
	Sr_{1.31}Pb_{0.69}GeSe_{4}		orthorhombic	Ama2	a = 10.31220 b = 10.39320 c = 7.42140				
	Sr_{0.19}Pb_{1.81}GeSe_{4}			I4̅2d	a = 14.6177				
	Sr_{12.6}Pb_{6.4}Ge_{11}Se_{44}		hexagonal	P6_{3}	a = 19.9867 c = 12.0546	4170.28		black; band gap 1.8 eV	
	Ag_{0.5}Pb_{1.75}GeS_{3}Se							band gap 2.0 eV	
