= Tomahawk missile =

American long-range, subsonic cruise missile

Tomahawk
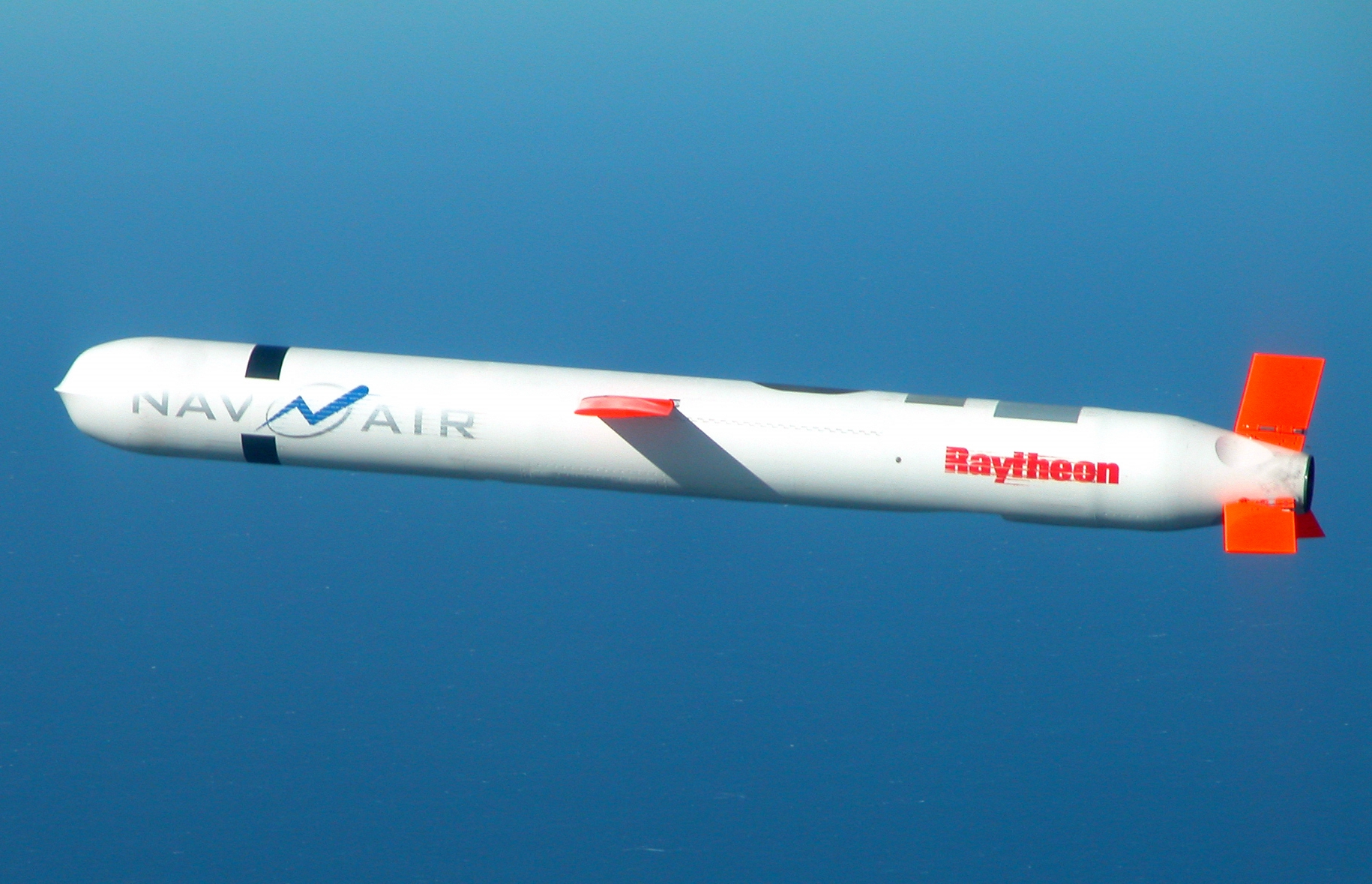
- A BGM-109 Tomahawk flying in November 2002
- Type: Cruise missile; Anti-ship missile (Block V & TASM variants); Submarine-launched cruise missile; Land-attack missile; Surface-to-surface missile
- Place of origin: United States

Service history
- In service: 1983–present
- Used by: United States; United Kingdom; Australia; Netherlands; Japan

Production history
- Manufacturer: General Dynamics (initially); McDonnell Douglas; Hughes Aircraft Company; Raytheon Missiles & Defense
- Unit cost: $3.1M (FY1986); $1.87M (FY2017) (Block IV); $2.5M (FY2026) (Block V); Export cost: $4M (FY2023)

Specifications
- Mass: 2,900 lb (1,300 kg); 3,500 lb (1,600 kg) with booster
- Length: 18 ft 3 in (5.56 m) without booster; 20 ft 6 in (6.25 m) with booster
- Diameter: 20.4 in (0.52 m)
- Wingspan: 8 ft 9 in (2.67 m)
- Warhead: BGM-109A: 1,000 lb (450 kg) conventional Bullpup or W80 nuclear warhead (yield 5 to 200 kilotonnes of TNT (21 to 837 TJ)) (retired); BGM-109C/E: WDU-36/B 690 lb (310 kg) unitary warhead containing 265 lb (120 kg) of PBXN-107 high explosive; BGM-109D: submunitions dispenser with 166 BLU-97/B Combined Effects Bomblets with 287 grams (0.633 lb) Cyclotol high explosive per munition
- Detonation mechanism: FMU-148 since TLAM Block III, others for special applications
- Engine: Williams International F107-WR-402 turbofan using TH-dimer fuel; solid-fuel rocket booster
- Operational range: Block II TLAM-N: 1,350 nmi (1,550 mi; 2,500 km); Block III TLAM-C, Block IV TLAM-E: 900 nmi (1,000 mi; 1,700 km); Block III TLAM-D: 700 nmi (810 mi; 1,300 km); Block IV: 864 nmi (994 mi; 1,600 km); Block Vb: >900 nmi (>1036 mi; >1666 km) (exact range is classified); RGM/UGM-109B TASM: 250 nmi (460 km)
- Flight altitude: 98–164 ft (30–50 m) AGL
- Maximum speed: Subsonic; ~Mach 0.74, about 570 mph (500 kn; 920 km/h)
- Guidance system: GPS, INS, TERCOM, DSMAC, active radar homing (RGM/UGM-109B)
- Launch platform: Mark 41 Vertical Launching System; Torpedo tubes; Surface ships; Submarines; TELs

The BGM-109 Tomahawk Land Attack Missile (TLAM) is an American long-range, all-weather, jet-powered, subsonic cruise missile that is used by the United States Navy, Royal Australian Navy, Royal Netherlands Navy and Royal Navy in ship and submarine-based land-attack operations.

Developed at the Applied Physics Laboratory of Johns Hopkins University under James H. Walker near Laurel, Maryland, the Tomahawk emerged in the 1970s as a modular cruise missile first manufactured by General Dynamics. Early tests of the missile took place between 1983 and 1993, during which time 23 cruise missiles were tested over northern Canada under the "Canada–U.S. Test and Evaluation Program". The goal of the program was to simulate the climate and terrain similar to that of the northern Soviet Union, and to allow the North American Aerospace Defence Command (NORAD) to develop an anti-cruise capability. The Tomahawk aimed to fulfill the need for a medium- to long-range, low-altitude missile with diverse capabilities. Its modular design allows for compatibility with a range of warheads, including high-explosive, submunitions, and bunker busters. The Tomahawk can use a variety of guidance systems, including GPS, inertial navigation, and terrain contour matching. Over a dozen variants and upgraded versions have been developed since the original design, including air-, sub-, and ground-launched configurations with both conventional and nuclear armaments.

The Tomahawk's manufacturing history has seen several transitions. General Dynamics served as the sole supplier in the 1970s. From 1992 until 1994, McDonnell Douglas was the sole supplier of Tomahawks, producing Block II and Block III versions and remanufacturing many Tomahawks to Block III specifications. In 1994, Hughes Aircraft, having purchased General Dynamics' missile division in 1992, outbid McDonnell Douglas to become the sole supplier of Tomahawks. A joint venture between Hughes and Raytheon manufactured the missile from 1995 until Raytheon's acquisition of Hughes in 1997, solidifying their position as the sole supplier. In 2016, the US Department of Defense purchased 149 Tomahawk Block IV missiles for $202.3 million. As of 2024, Raytheon remains the sole manufacturer of non-nuclear, sea-launched Tomahawk variants.

Tomahawk missiles have been extensively used by the United States since the First Gulf War. Record number of Tomahawk missiles were fired during Operation Epic Fury, according to the Center for Strategic and International Studies. Rebuilding the inventory following the war is estimated to take several years.

== Variants ==
The variants and multiple upgrades to the missile include:

- BGM-109A Tomahawk Land Attack Missile – Nuclear (TLAM-N) with a W80 nuclear warhead. Retired from service sometime between 2010 and 2013. Reports from early 2018 state that the US Navy is considering reintroducing a (yet unknown type of) nuclear-armed cruise missile into service.
- BGM-109G Gryphon Ground Launched Cruise Missile (GLCM) – with a W84 nuclear warhead; withdrawn from service in 1991 to comply with the INF Treaty.
- RGM/UGM-109B Tomahawk Anti-Ship Missile (TASM) – Anti-ship variant with active radar homing; withdrawn from service in 1994 and converted to TLAM-E Block IV version.
- BGM-109C Tomahawk Land Attack Missile – Conventional (TLAM-C Block II) with WDU-25/B unitary warhead also used on the AGM-12B Bullpup. The WDU-25/B warhead weighed 992 pounds (450 kg) and contained 378 pounds (171 kg) of Picratol and Composition H-6 high explosives. Starting in May 1993, the WDU-25/B warhead was replaced by the lighter WDU-36/B warhead weighing 690 pounds (310 kg) and filled with 265 pounds (120 kg) of PBXN-107 high explosive. The smaller warhead allowed the fuel tank to be enlarged, increasing the maximum range. This version was given the designation TLAM-C Block III.
- BGM-109D Tomahawk Land Attack Missile – Dispenser (TLAM-D) with a submunitions dispenser that carried 166 BLU-97/B Combined Effects Bomblets with 287 grams (0.633 lb) Cyclotol high explosive per munition
- Kit 2 Tomahawk Land Attack Missile – with a unique warhead used to disable electrical grids. First used in the Gulf War.
- RGM/UGM-109E Tomahawk Land Attack Missile (TLAM-E Block IV) – improved version of the TLAM-C Block III. Also called Tactical Tomahawk, a term which now incorporates other variants as well.
- RGM/UGM-109E Block V (TLAM)
- RGM/UGM-109E Block Va (Maritime Strike Tomahawk, MST)
- RGM/UGM-109E Block Vb (JMEWS)
- AGM-109H/L Medium Range Air-to-Surface Missile (MRASM) – a shorter-range, turbojet powered air-launched cruise missile with conventional non-nuclear warheads intended for USAF and Navy. AGM-109H for USAF, 5.84 m (19 ft 2 in) long, with TERCOM en-route and DSMAC terminal guidance, and payload of runway cratering submunitions for use against airfields. AGM-109L for US Navy, 4.87 m (16 ft 0 in) long, with unitary warhead for use against ships or high value land targets, and imaging infra-red seeker and datalink. Never entered service, cost US$569,000 (1999).

BGM-109G Gryphon Ground Launched Cruise Missiles (GLCM) and their truck-like launch vehicles were employed at bases in Europe; they were withdrawn from service to comply with the 1987 Intermediate-Range Nuclear Forces Treaty. Many of the anti-ship versions were converted into TLAMs at the end of the Cold War. The Block III TLAMs that entered service in 1993 can fly farther using their new turbofan engines and use Global Positioning System (GPS) receivers to strike more precisely. Block III TLAM-Cs retain the Digital Scene Matching Area Correlation (DSMAC) II navigation system, allowing three kinds of navigation: GPS-only, which allow for rapid mission planning, with some reduced accuracy, DSMAC-only, which take longer to plan but terminal accuracy is somewhat better; and GPS-aided missions that combine DSMAC II and GPS navigation for greatest accuracy. Block IV TLAMs have an improved turbofan engine that allows them to get better fuel economy and change speeds in flight. The Block IV TLAMs can loiter better and have electro-optical sensors that allow real-time battle damage assessment. The Block IVs can be given a new target in flight and can transmit an image, via satcom, immediately before impact to help determine whether the missile is on target and the likely damage from the attack.

Babur, a nuclear capable cruise missile developed by the National Defence Complex (NDC) based on reverse-engineered copies of Tomahawk missiles recovered by Pakistani intelligence after a 1998 U.S. strike in Afghanistan.

== Development history ==
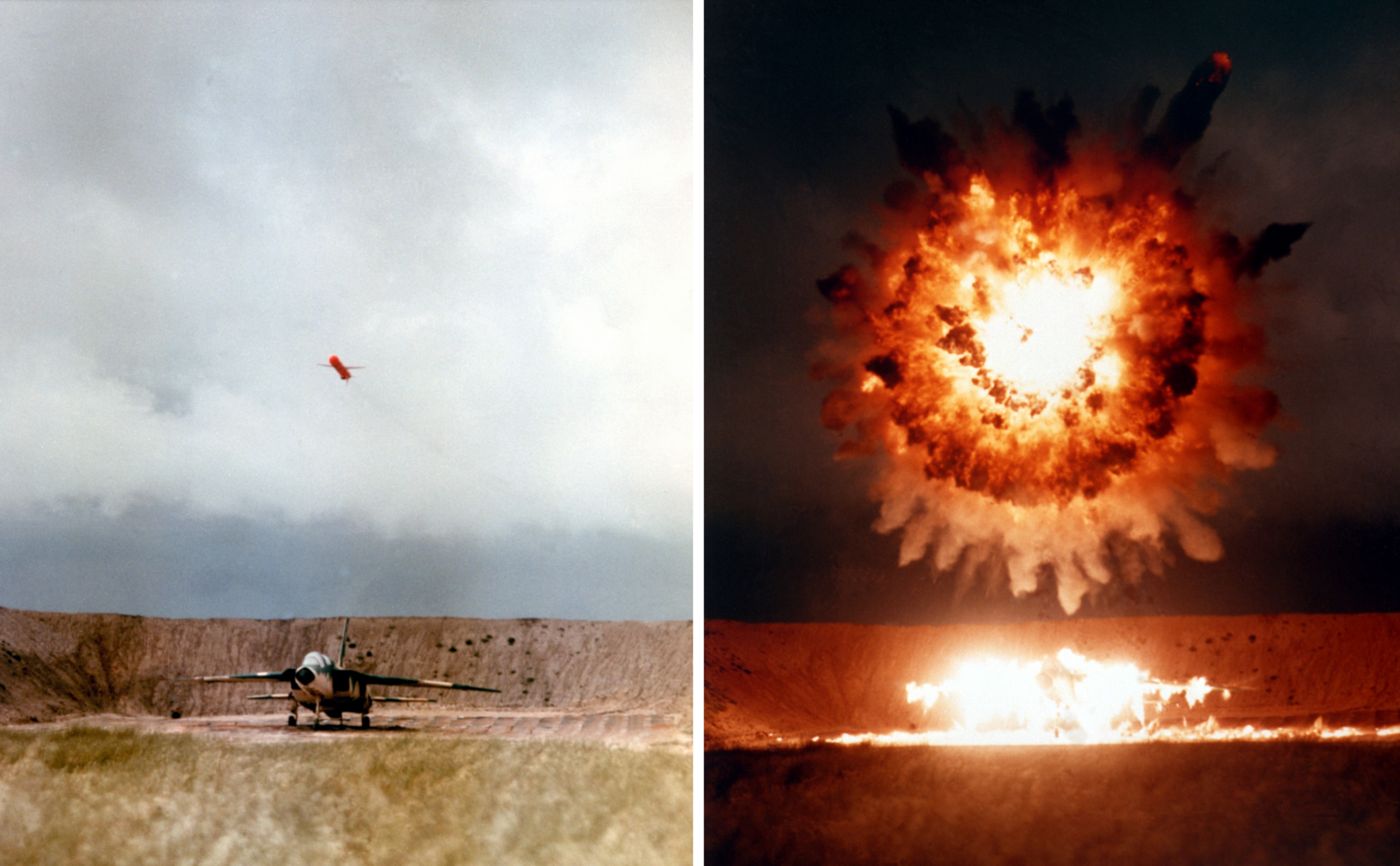
UGM-109 Tomahawk missile detonates above a test target, 1986.

=== Tomahawk ===
A major improvement to the Tomahawk is network-centric warfare capabilities, using data from multiple sensors (aircraft, UAVs, satellites, foot soldiers, tanks, ships) to find its target. It will also be able to send data from its sensors to these platforms.

=== Block II ===
Tomahawk Block II variants were all tested during January 1981 to October 1983. Deployed in 1984, some of the improvements included: an improved booster rocket, cruise missile radar altimeter, and navigation through the Digital Scene Matching Area Corellator (DSMAC). DSMAC was a highly accurate rudimentary AI which allowed early low power computers to navigate and precisely target objectives using cameras on board the missile. With its ability to visually identify and aim directly at a target, it was more accurate than weapons using estimated GPS coordinates. Due to the very limited computer power of the day, DSMAC did not directly evaluate the maps, but instead would compute contrast maps and then combine multiple maps into a buffer, then compare the average of those combined images to determine if it was similar to the data in its small memory system. The data for the flight path was very low resolution in order to free up memory to be used for high resolution data about the target area. The guidance data was computed by a mainframe computer which took spy satellite photos and estimated what the terrain would appear like during low level flight. Since this data would not match the real terrain exactly, and since terrain changes seasonally and with changes in light quality, DSMAC would filter out differences between maps and use the remaining similar sections in order to find its location regardless of changes in how the ground appeared. It also had an extremely bright strobe light it could use to illuminate the ground for fractions of a second in order to find its position at night, and was able to take the difference in ground appearance into account.

=== Block III ===
Tomahawk Block III introduced in 1993 added time-of-arrival control and improved accuracy for Digital Scene Matching Area Correlator (DSMAC) and jam-resistant GPS, smaller, lighter WDU-36 warhead, engine improvements and extended missile's range.

=== Block IV ===
Block IV is the beginning of the Tactical Tomahawk (TACTOM) program.

The TACTOM program was initiated in DEC 1997 as a result of changed operational requirements from Fleet Commanders requesting a more flexible, more responsive, and more affordable missile identified in Desert Storm, Bosnia, and Desert Fox. The Block (BLK) IV All-Up-Round (AUR) (includes the missile in a canister for surface launch or in a capsule for submarine launch) was built upon the legacy of the Tomahawk Baseline Improvement Program (TBIP), but provided a missile with improved flexibility and increased responsiveness.

A Low Rate Initial Production contract was awarded to Raytheon (RTX) in October 2002. TACTOM reached Initial Operating Capability (IOC) in 2004.

Tactical Tomahawk Weapons Control System (TTWCS) takes advantage of a loitering feature in the missile's flight path and allows commanders to redirect the missile to an alternative target, if required. It can be reprogrammed in-flight to attack predesignated targets with GPS coordinates stored in its memory or to any other GPS coordinates. Also, the missile can send data about its status back to the commander. It entered service with the US Navy in late 2004. The Tactical Tomahawk Weapons Control System (TTWCS) added the capability for limited mission planning on board the firing unit (FRU).

Tomahawk Block IV introduced in 2006 adds the strike controller which can change the missile in flight to one of 15 preprogrammed alternate targets or redirect it to a new target. This targeting flexibility includes the capability to loiter over the battlefield awaiting a more critical target. The missile can also transmit battle damage indication imagery and missile health and status messages via the two-way satellite data link. Firing platforms now have the capability to plan and execute GPS-only missions. Block IV also has an improved anti-jam GPS receiver for enhanced mission performance. Block IV includes Tomahawk Weapons Control System (TTWCS), and Tomahawk Command and Control System (TC2S).

On 16 August 2010, the Navy completed the first live test of the Joint Multi-Effects Warhead System (JMEWS), a new warhead designed to give the Tomahawk the same blast-fragmentation capabilities while introducing enhanced penetration capabilities in a single warhead. In the static test, the warhead detonated and created a hole large enough for the follow-through element to completely penetrate the concrete target. In February 2014, US Central Command sponsored development and testing of the JMEWS, analyzing the ability of the programmable warhead to integrate onto the Block IV Tomahawk, giving the missile bunker buster effects to better penetrate hardened structures.

In 2012, the USN studied applying Advanced Anti-Radiation Guided Missile (AARGM) technology into the Tactical Tomahawk.

In 2014, Raytheon began testing Block IV improvements to attack sea and moving land targets. The new passive radar seeker will pick up the electromagnetic radar signature of a target and follow it, and actively send out a signal to bounce off potential targets before impact to discriminate its legitimacy before impact. Mounting the multi-mode sensor on the missile's nose would remove fuel space, but company officials believe the Navy would be willing to give up space for the sensor's new technologies. The previous Tomahawk Anti-Ship Missile, retired over a decade earlier, was equipped with inertial guidance and the seeker of the Harpoon missile and there was concern with its ability to clearly discriminate between targets from a long distance, since at the time Navy sensors did not have as much range as the missile itself, which would be more reliable with the new seeker's passive detection and millimeter-wave active radar homing. Raytheon estimates adding the new seeker would cost $250,000 per missile. Other upgrades include a sea-skimming flight path. The first Block IV TLAMs modified with a maritime attack capability were scheduled to enter service in 2021.

A supersonic version of the Tomahawk is under consideration for development with a ramjet to increase its speed to Mach 3. A limiting factor to this is the dimensions of shipboard launch tubes. Instead of modifying every ship able to carry cruise missiles, the ramjet-powered Tomahawk would still have to fit within a 21-inch (530 mm) diameter and 20-foot (6.1 m) long tube.

In October 2015, Raytheon announced the Tomahawk had demonstrated new capabilities in a test launch, using its onboard camera to take a reconnaissance photo and transmit it to fleet headquarters. It then entered a loitering pattern until given new targeting coordinates to strike.

By January 2016, Los Alamos National Laboratory was working on a project to turn unburned fuel left over when a Tomahawk reaches its target into an additional explosive force. To do this, the missile's JP-10 fuel is turned into a fuel air explosive to combine with oxygen in the air and burn rapidly. The thermobaric explosion of the burning fuel acts, in effect, as an additional warhead and can even be more powerful than the main warhead itself when there is sufficient fuel left in the case of a short-range target.

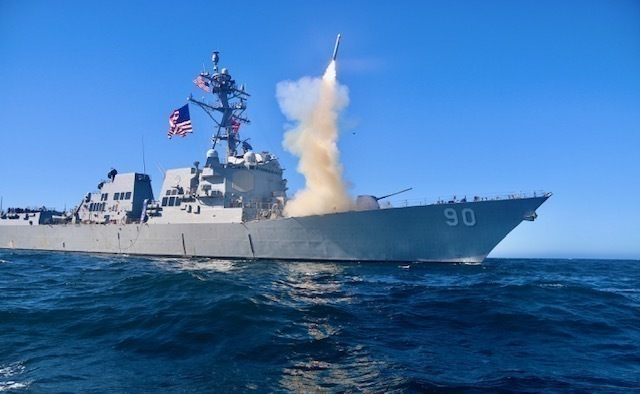
The USS Chafee (DDG-90) launches a Block V Tomahawk during the start of operational testing in 2020.

=== Production line shutdown averted ===
Production of Block IV TACTOMS slowed to 100 per year in FY18. By FY19, production of new Tomahawks was intended to stop completely as the production line shifted to the recertification of preexisting TACTOMS and installation of "A2AD modernization kits." This recertification and upgrade effort would eventually become the Block V portion of the TACTOM program. The President requested no funds for new production in FY19. However, to keep the supplier base solvent, Congress funded 90 new-build Block IV missiles for FY19, the minimum sustainment rate. Small quantities of new-build Block IV missiles continued being built until FY22, during which year production transitioned to Block V for new AURs, and production never ceased.

=== Block V ===
Block V exists within the Tactical Tomahawk program and contains three major sub-variants.

Block V started as a recertification program for existing Block IV TACTOMS.

Block V missiles introduce an Advanced Communications Architecture (ACA), Maritime Strike capability (Block Va), and a new Joint Multiple Effects Warhead System (JMEWS) (Block Vb).

Raytheon is re-certifying older Block IV missiles to Block V standards, extending their service life by 15 years, and producing new Tomahawks as Block V variants.

Variants:

- Block V: A modernized TACTOM with upgraded navigation and communication, including anti-jam GPS.
- Block Va: Block V anti-ship version, capable of hitting moving targets at sea. Block Va's range is shorter than the Block V's, due to the extra space for the new navigation/sensor/passive radar needs. Estimate the Block Va's range is 310 to 430 mi (500 to 700 km)
- Block Vb: Uses a joint multi-effects warhead (JMEWS) that can hit more diverse land targets, using a multi-mode blast fragmentation and penetrating warhead. IOC is slated for 2027.
- MST kit: Converts an older Block IV TACTOM into a re-certified Block Va MST TACTOM.

In 2025, a spokesperson for the U.S. Navy's Tomahawk program announced that the MST would be operational on destroyers by the end of September that year, with deployment to attack submarines to follow in FY26. All Block IV Tomahawks will be converted to Block V standard, while the remaining Block III missiles will be retired and demilitarized.

In 2020, Los Alamos National Laboratory reported that it would use corn ethanol to produce domestic fuel for Tomahawk missiles, which also does not require harsh acids to manufacture, compared to petroleum-based JP-10.

== Launch systems ==
Each missile is stored in and launched from a pressurized canister that protects it during transportation and storage, and also serves as a launch tube. These canisters were racked in Armored Box Launchers (ABL), which were installed on the four reactivated Iowa-class battleships USS Iowa, USS New Jersey, USS Missouri, and USS Wisconsin. The ABLs were also installed on eight Spruance-class destroyers, the four Virginia-class cruisers, and the nuclear cruiser USS Long Beach. These canisters are also in vertical launching systems (VLS) in other surface ships, capsule launch systems (CLS) in the later Los Angeles-class submarine and Virginia-class submarines, and in submarines' torpedo tubes. All ABL equipped ships have been decommissioned.

For submarine-launched missiles (called UGM-109s), after being ejected by gas pressure (vertically via the VLS) or by water impulse (horizontally via the torpedo tube), a solid-fuel booster is ignited to propel the missile and guide it out of the water.

After achieving flight, the missile's wings are unfolded for lift, the airscoop is exposed and the turbofan engine is employed for cruise flight. Over water, the Tomahawk uses inertial guidance or GPS to follow a preset course; once over land, the missile's guidance system is aided by terrain contour matching (TERCOM). Terminal guidance is provided by the Digital Scene Matching Area Correlation (DSMAC) system or GPS, producing a claimed circular error probable of about 30 feet (10 m).

The Tomahawk Weapon System consists of the missile, Theater Mission Planning Center (TMPC)/Afloat Planning System, and either the Tomahawk Weapon Control System (on surface ships) or Combat Control System (for submarines).

Several versions of control systems have been used, including:

- v2 TWCS – Tomahawk Weapon Control System (1983), also known as "green screens", was based on an old tank computing system.
- v3 ATWCS – Advanced Tomahawk Weapon Control System (1994), first Commercial Off the Shelf, uses HP-UX.
- v4 TTWCS – Tactical Tomahawk Weapon Control System, (2003).
- v5 TTWCS – Next Generation Tactical Tomahawk Weapon Control System. (2006)

On 18 August 2019, the United States Navy conducted a test flight of a Tomahawk missile launched from a ground-based version of the Mark 41 Vertical Launch System. It was the United States' first acknowledged launch of a missile that would have violated the 1987 Intermediate-Range Nuclear Forces Treaty, from which the Trump administration withdrew on 2 August after Russia broke it.

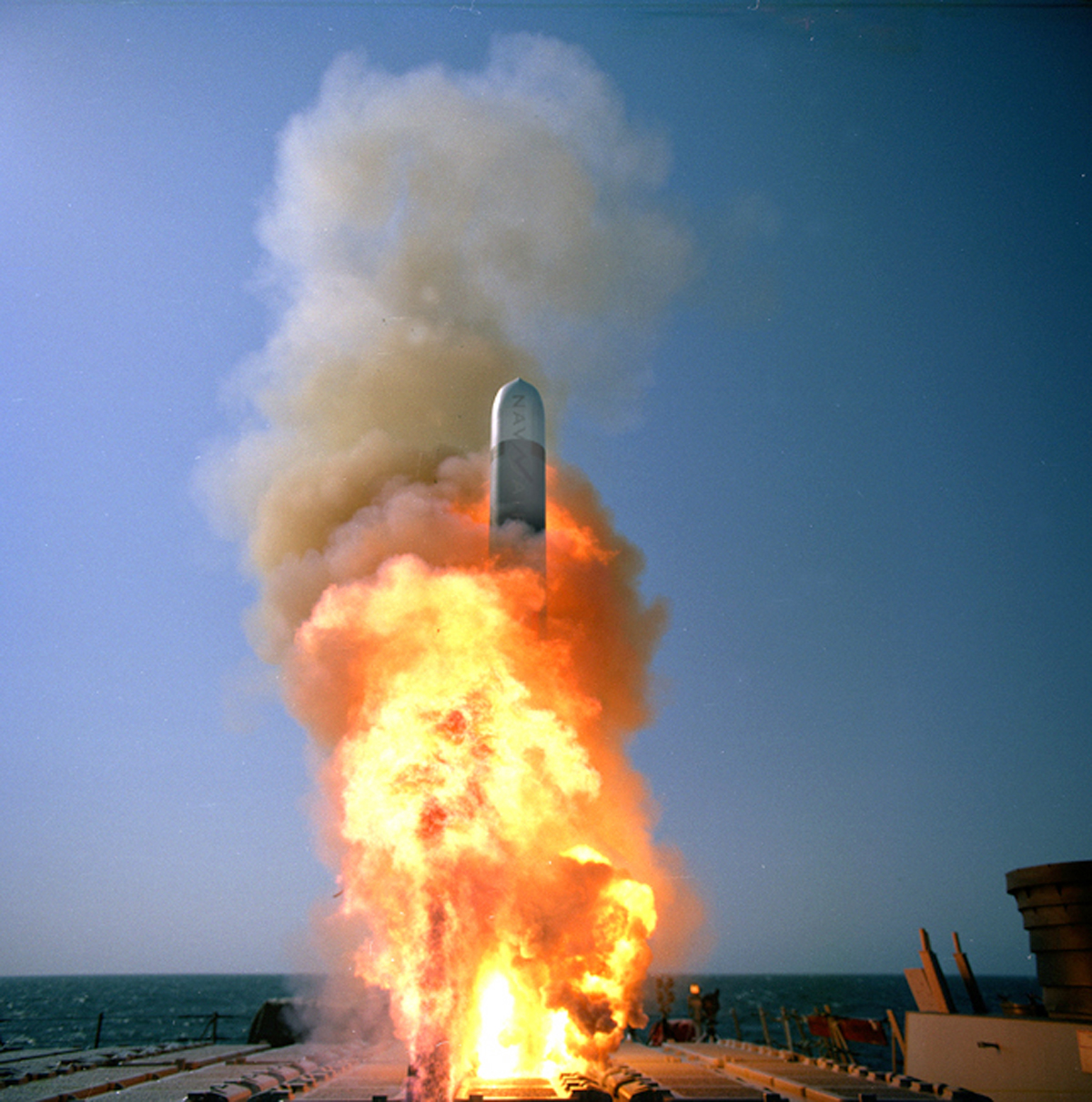
Launch of a Tactical Tomahawk cruise missile from USS Stethem

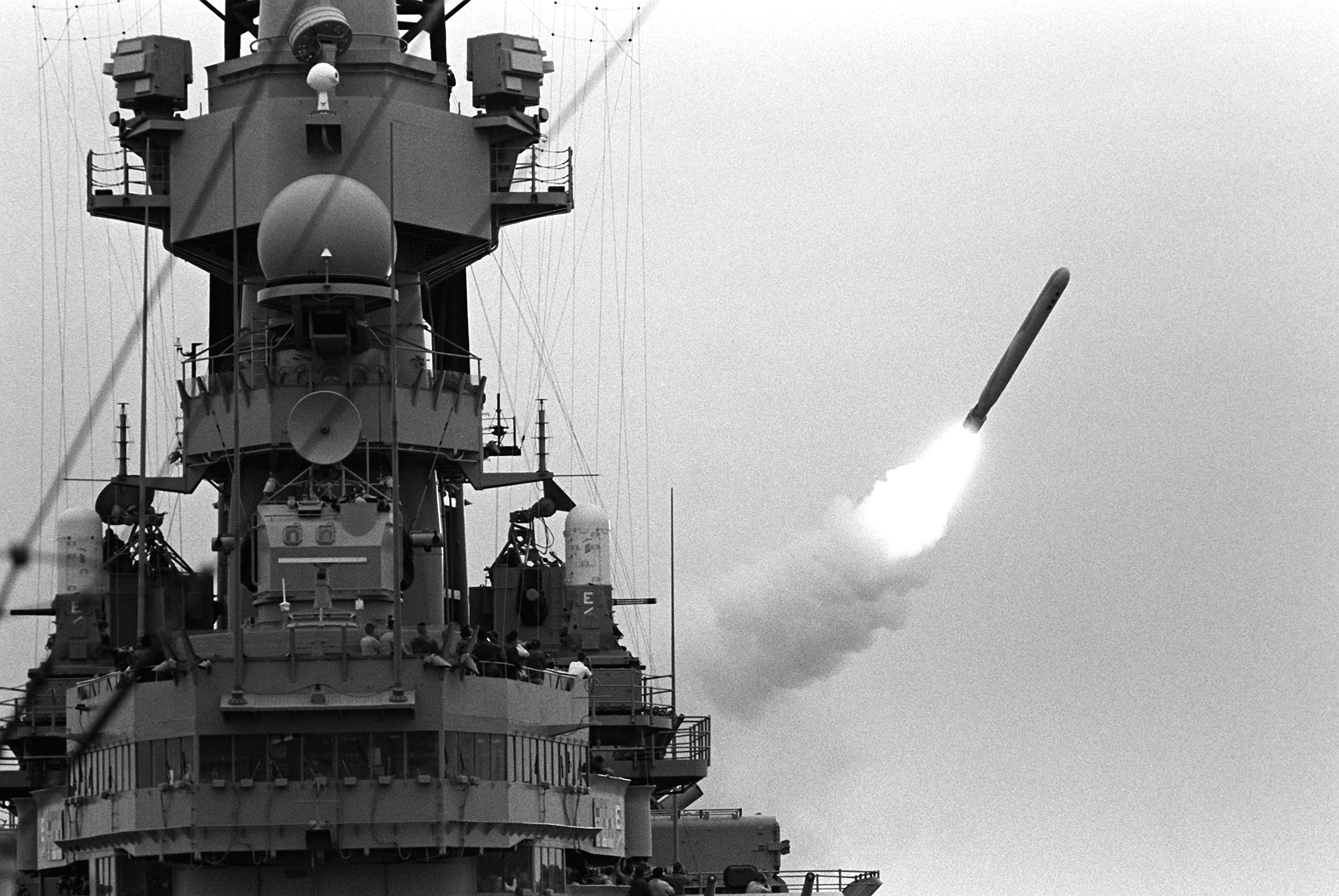
Battleship USS Missouri launching a Tomahawk missile

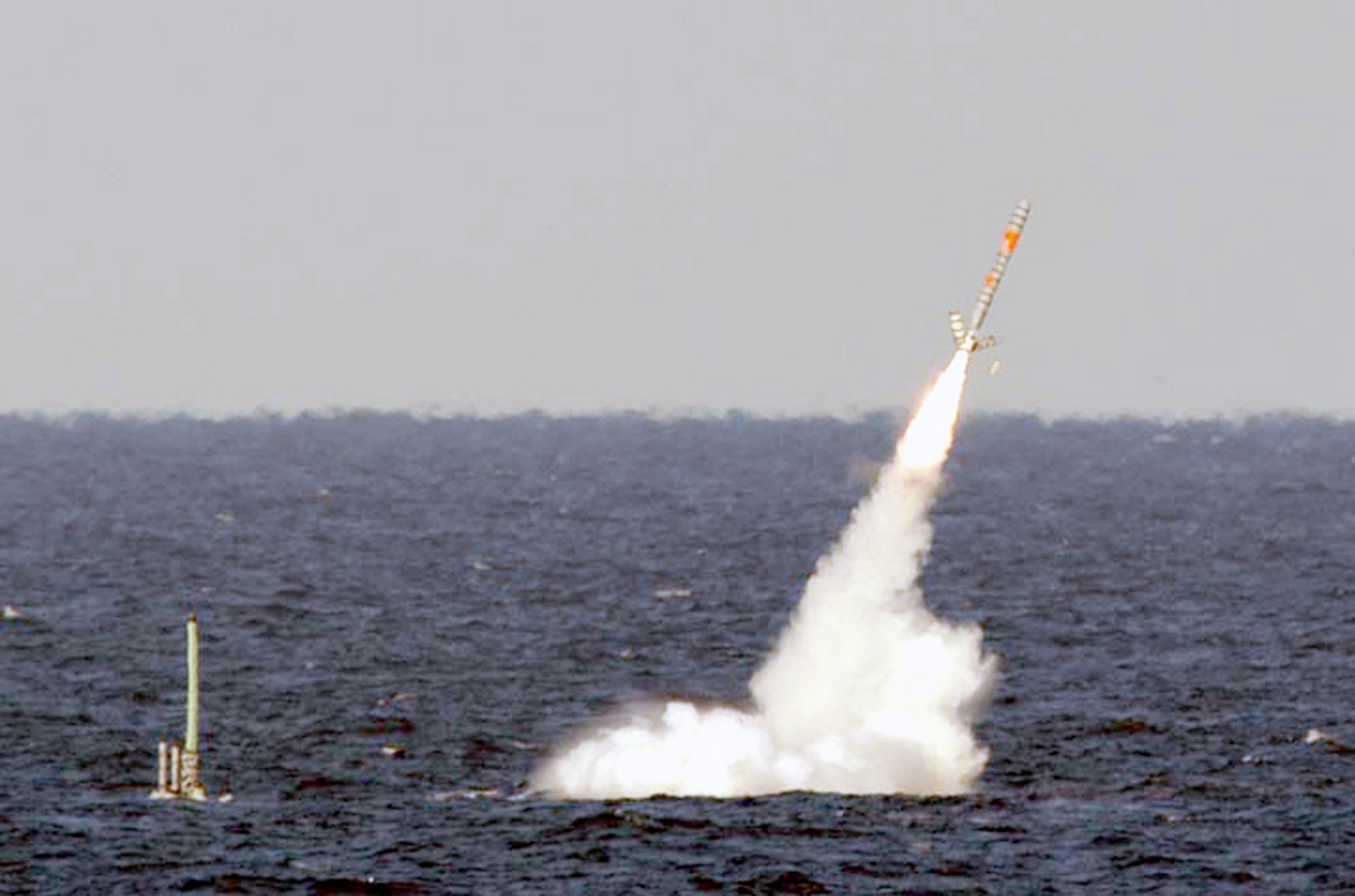
Submarine launch from USS Florida

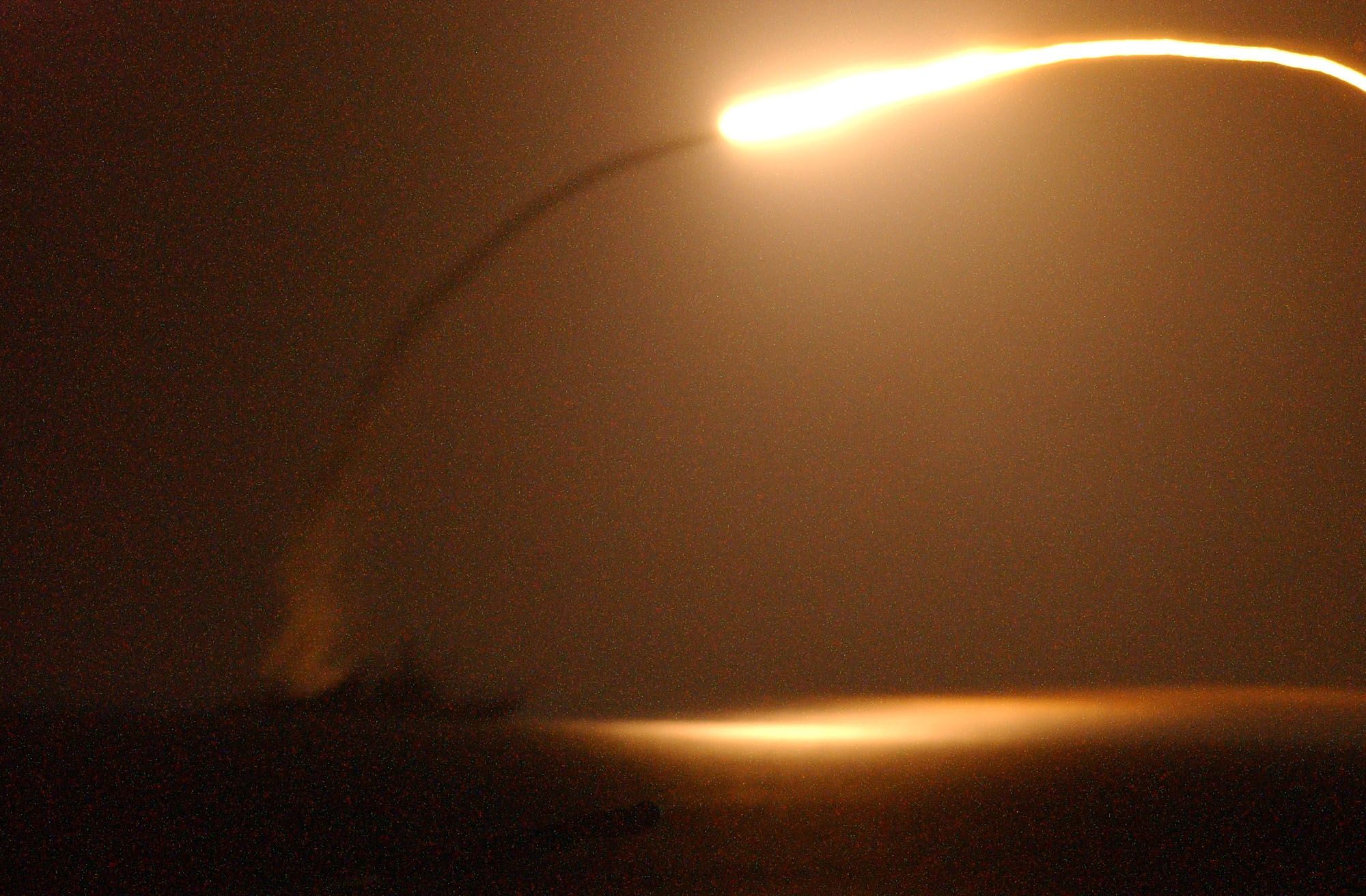
Launch trajectory from an Arleigh Burke-class destroyer

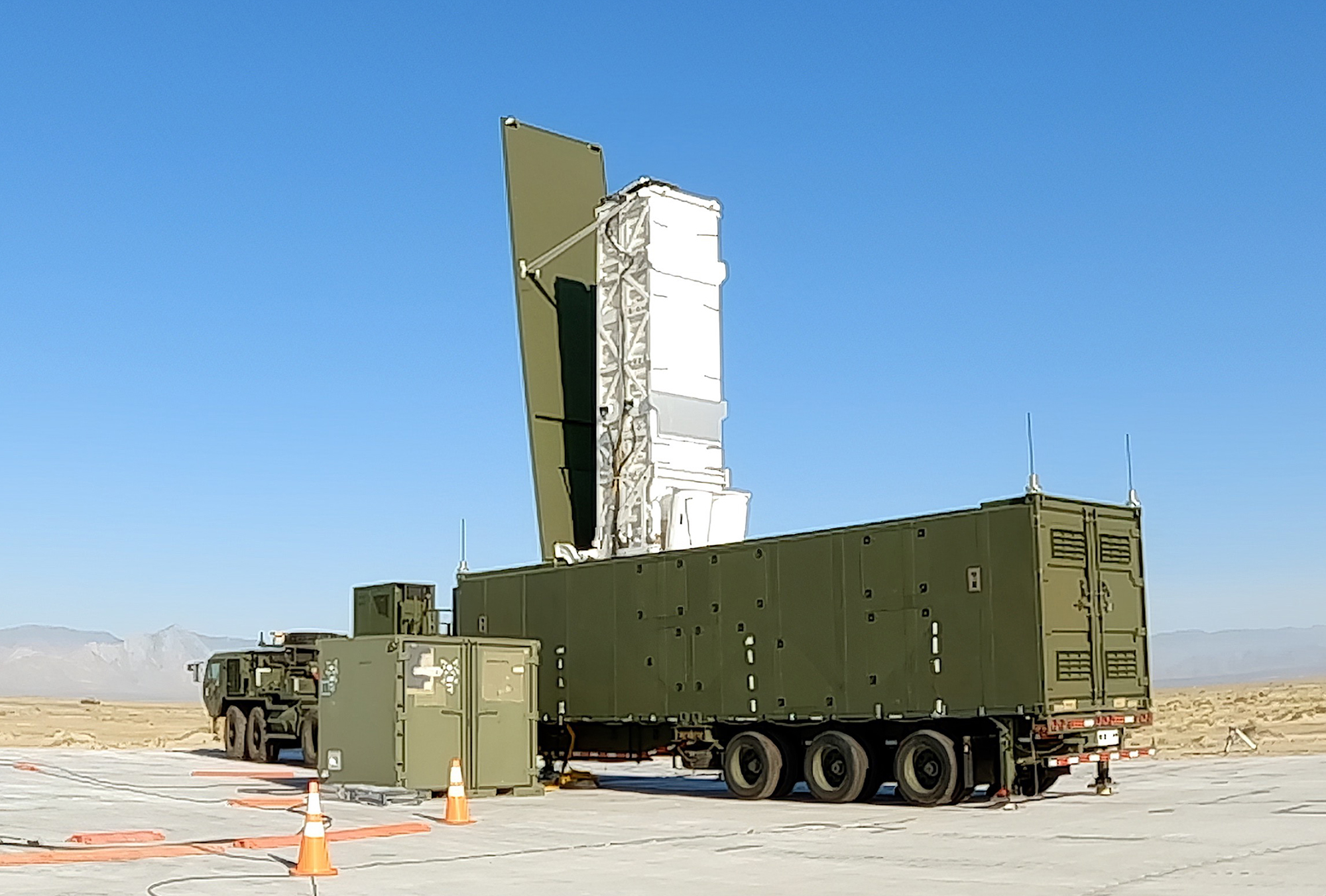
Typhon missile launcher.

The United States Army has successfully launched a Tomahawk from the Typhon missile launcher.

Latest launcher is the Extreme Multi-Mission Autonomous Vehicle (X-MAV) built by Oshkosh

== Munitions ==
The TLAM-D contains 166 sub-munitions in 24 canisters: 22 canisters of seven each, and two canisters of six each to conform to the dimensions of the airframe. The sub-munitions are the same type of Combined Effects Munition bomblet used in large quantities by the US Air Force with the CBU-87 Combined Effects Munition. The sub-munitions canisters are dispensed two at a time, one per side. The missile can perform up to five separate target segments which enables it to attack multiple targets. However, in order to achieve a sufficient density of coverage typically all 24 canisters are dispensed sequentially from back to front.

== Navigation ==
TERCOM – Terrain Contour Matching. A digital representation of an area of terrain is mapped based on digital terrain elevation data or stereoscopic imagery. This map is then inserted into a TLAM mission which is then loaded onto the missile. When the missile is in flight it compares the stored map data with radar altimeter data collected as the missile overflies the map. Based on comparison results the missile's inertial navigation system is updated and the missile corrects its course. TERCOM was based on, and was a significant improvement on, "Fingerprint," a technology developed in 1964 for the SLAM.

DSMAC – Digital Scene Matching Area Correlation. A digitized image of an area is mapped and then inserted into a TLAM mission. During the flight, the missile will verify that the images that it has stored correlates with the image it sees below itself. Based on comparison results, the missile's inertial navigation system is updated and the missile corrects its course.

GPS – The Tomahawk relies on the Global Positioning Recognition System as a guidance mechanism.

== Procurement ==
=== Tactical Tomahawk (TACTOM) ===
As of FY26:

- 90 per year: the Minimum Sustainment Rate for Tomahawk Block V production. Reaching this number would require Foreign Military Sales (FMS) orders to supplement US orders. Dropping below this rate would come with significant risk to the supply base, such as subcontractors ceasing work.
- 250 per year: the 1-8-5 production rate (1 shift per day, 8 hours a day, 5 days a week).
- 600 per year: the maximum theoretical production rate at current facilitization.

On 4 February 2026, RTX announced an agreement with the US Department of Defense (DOD) to increase Tomahawk production to over 1,000 units per year with a 7-year production agreement. The FY26 Defense Appropriations Act allowed for this. The DOD finalized this plan on August 17, 2026 with a $22.9B award to Raytheon to increase production to "more than 1,000" units per year.

In addition to new production of Block V missiles, the US is also procuring hundreds of modification kits each year, of various types, to upgrade older Block IV missiles to the Block V standard. This includes "MST kits" at an additional cost to upgrade a Block IV into a Block Va MST. These upgrade kits reduce stockpile attrition through obsolescence but do not contribute to new-missile production numbers. The Navy has said that all Block IV tomahawks in inventory will be upgraded to Block V, adding 15 years to the stockpile's shelf life.

Procurement by Year
Country	Service	Year	Block IV	Block V	Block Va	Block Vb
USA	Navy	2019 and earlier	3301			
USA	Navy	2020	90			
USA	Navy	2021	130			
USA	Army	2022		30		
USA	Navy	2022		70		
USA	Marines	2022		54		
USA	Army	2023		56		
USA	Navy	2023		40		
USA	Marines	2023		13		
JPN	JMSDF	2024	200	200		
USA	Army	2024		44		
USA	Marines	2024		25		
USA	Army	2025		26		
USA	Marines	2025			18	
USA	Army	2026			7	
USA	Navy	2026		57		

Note: Quantities for FMS customers are approximate and typically reflect the upper contracted limit.

Production by Lot (Includes FMS)
Lot	Fiscal year(s)	Quantity awarded
LRIP-1	FY2002	25
LRIP-2	FY2003	167
LRIP-3	FY2004	210
FRP-1 to FRP-5	FY2004–FY2008	1,881
FRP-6 to FRP-7	FY2009–FY2010	403
FRP-8	FY2011	196
FRP-9	FY2012	361
FRP-10	FY2013	252
FRP-11	FY2014	231
FRP-12	FY2015	214
FRP-13	FY2016	214
FRP-14	FY2017	196
Total		4,350

== Operational history ==
Operators Current Potential

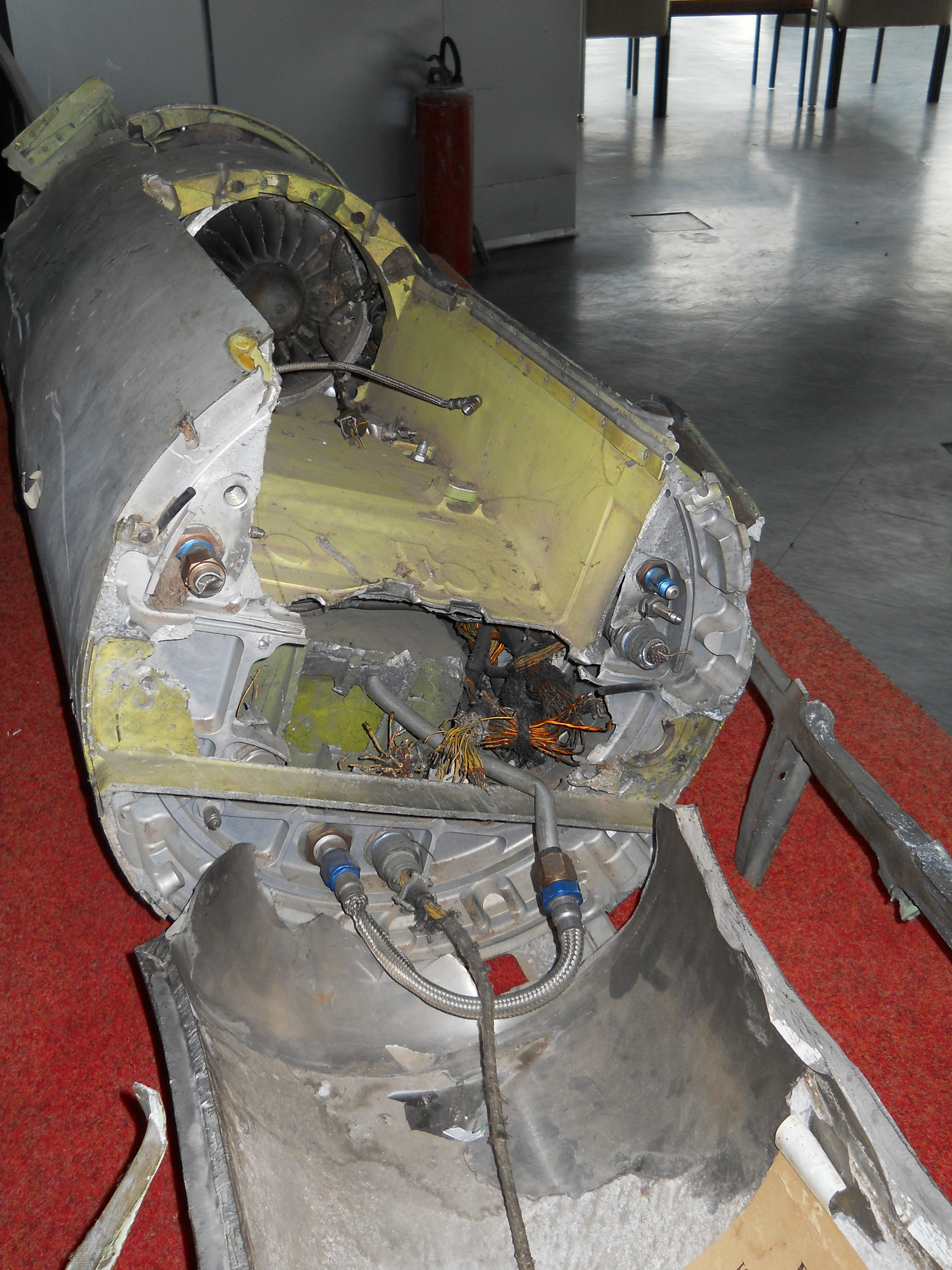
Remnants of the turbofan engine of a Tomahawk allegedly shot down during the 1999 NATO bombing of Yugoslavia, on display at the Museum of Aviation in Belgrade, Serbia.

=== United States ===
==== Air Force ====
United States Air Force

The Air Force is a former operator of the nuclear-armed version of the Tomahawk, the BGM-109G Gryphon.

==== Army ====
United States Army

In November 2020, the United States Army selected the Tomahawk to fulfill its Mid-Range Capability (MRC), giving it a land-based long-range missile capable of striking ground and sea targets. The Army plans to use the Tomahawk alongside a ground-based SM-6 and field them by late 2023.

==== Marines ====
United States Marine Corps

In May 2022 the Defense Department announced a contract to buy Tomahawk missiles for the Navy, the Army, and the Marine Corps.

==== Navy ====
United States Navy

Tomahawk missiles have been used extensively by the United States since the First Gulf War.

- In the 1991 Gulf War, 288 Tomahawks were launched, 12 from submarines and 276 from surface ships. The first salvo was fired by the destroyer USS Paul F. Foster on 17 January 1991. The attack submarines USS Pittsburgh and USS Louisville followed.
- 17 January 1993: 46 Tomahawks were fired at the Zafraniyah Nuclear Fabrication Facility outside Baghdad, in response to Iraq's refusal to cooperate with UN disarmament inspectors.
- 26 June 1993: 23 Tomahawks were fired at the Iraqi Intelligence Service's command and control center.
- 10 September 1995: USS Normandy launched 13 Tomahawk missiles from the central Adriatic Sea against a key air defense radio relay tower in Bosnian Serb territory during Operation Deliberate Force.
- 3 September 1996: 44 ship-launched UGM-109 and B-52-launched AGM-86 cruise missiles were fired at air defense targets in southern Iraq.
- 20 August 1998: 79 Tomahawk missiles were fired simultaneously at two targets in Afghanistan and Sudan in retaliation for the bombings of American embassies by Al-Qaeda.
- 16 December 1998: 325 Tomahawk missiles were fired at key Iraqi targets during Operation Desert Fox.
- In early 1999, 218 Tomahawk missiles were fired by US ships and a British submarine during the 1999 NATO bombing of Yugoslavia against targets in the Federal Republic of Yugoslavia.
- October 2001: about 50 Tomahawk missiles struck targets in Afghanistan in the opening hours of Operation Enduring Freedom.
- During the 2003 invasion of Iraq, more than 802 Tomahawk missiles were fired at key Iraqi targets.
- 3 March 2008: two Tomahawk missiles were fired at a target in Somalia by a US vessel during the Dobley airstrike, reportedly in an attempt to kill Saleh Ali Saleh Nabhan, an al Qaeda militant.
- 17 December 2009: two Tomahawk missiles were fired at targets in Yemen. One TLAM-D struck an Al-Qaeda training camp in al-Ma'jalah in al-Mahfad, a region of the Abyan governorate of Yemen.
- 19 March 2011: 124 Tomahawk missiles were fired by US and British forces (112 US, 12 British) against at least 20 Libyan targets around Tripoli and Misrata. As of 22 March 2011, 159 UGM-109 were fired by US and UK ships against Libyan targets.
- 23 September 2014: 47 Tomahawk missiles were fired by the United States from USS Arleigh Burke and USS Philippine Sea, which were operating from international waters in the Red Sea and Persian Gulf, against ISIL targets in Syria in the vicinity of Raqqa, Deir ez-Zor, Al-Hasakah and Abu Kamal, and against Khorasan group targets in Syria west of Aleppo.
- 13 October 2016: five Tomahawk cruise missiles were launched by USS Nitze at three radar sites in Yemen held by Houthi rebels in response to anti-ship missiles fired at US Navy ships the day before.
- On 6 April 2017, 59 Tomahawk missiles were launched from USS Ross (DDG-71) and USS Porter (DDG-78), targeting Shayrat Airbase near Homs, in Syria. The strike was in response to the Khan Shaykhun chemical attack, an act carried out by Syrian President Bashar al-Assad. US Central Command stated in a press release that Tomahawk missiles hit "aircraft, hardened aircraft shelters, petroleum and logistical storage, ammunition supply bunkers, defense systems, and radars". Initial US reports claimed "approximately 20 planes" were destroyed, and that 58 out of the 59 cruise missiles launched had "severely degraded or destroyed" their intended target.
- On 14 April 2018, the US launched 66 Tomahawk cruise missiles at Syrian targets near Damascus and Homs, as part of the April 2018 missile strikes against Syria. These strikes were carried out as retaliation for the Douma chemical attack. The United States Department of Defense said Syria fired 40 defensive missiles at the allied weapons but did not hit any targets. The Russian military said that Syrian air defenses shot down 71 of the 103 missiles launched by the US and its allies, but it was not possible to verify the claims.
- On 11 January 2024, US officials stated that over 80 Tomahawk cruise missile were launched by USS Philippine Sea (CG-58), USS Gravely (DDG-107), USS Mason (DDG-87), and USS Florida (SSGN-728). According to US officials these strikes targeted Houthi assets including command and control nodes, munitions, depots, launching systems, production facilities, and air defense radar systems these were then followed up by attacks from aircraft launched from the carrier USS Dwight D. Eisenhower. These strikes came in response to Houthi attacks on civilian vessels transiting the Red Sea and failure to abide by repeated warnings from western officials. With strikes continuing in the following months, this number had increased to 135 missiles by 24 July 2024.

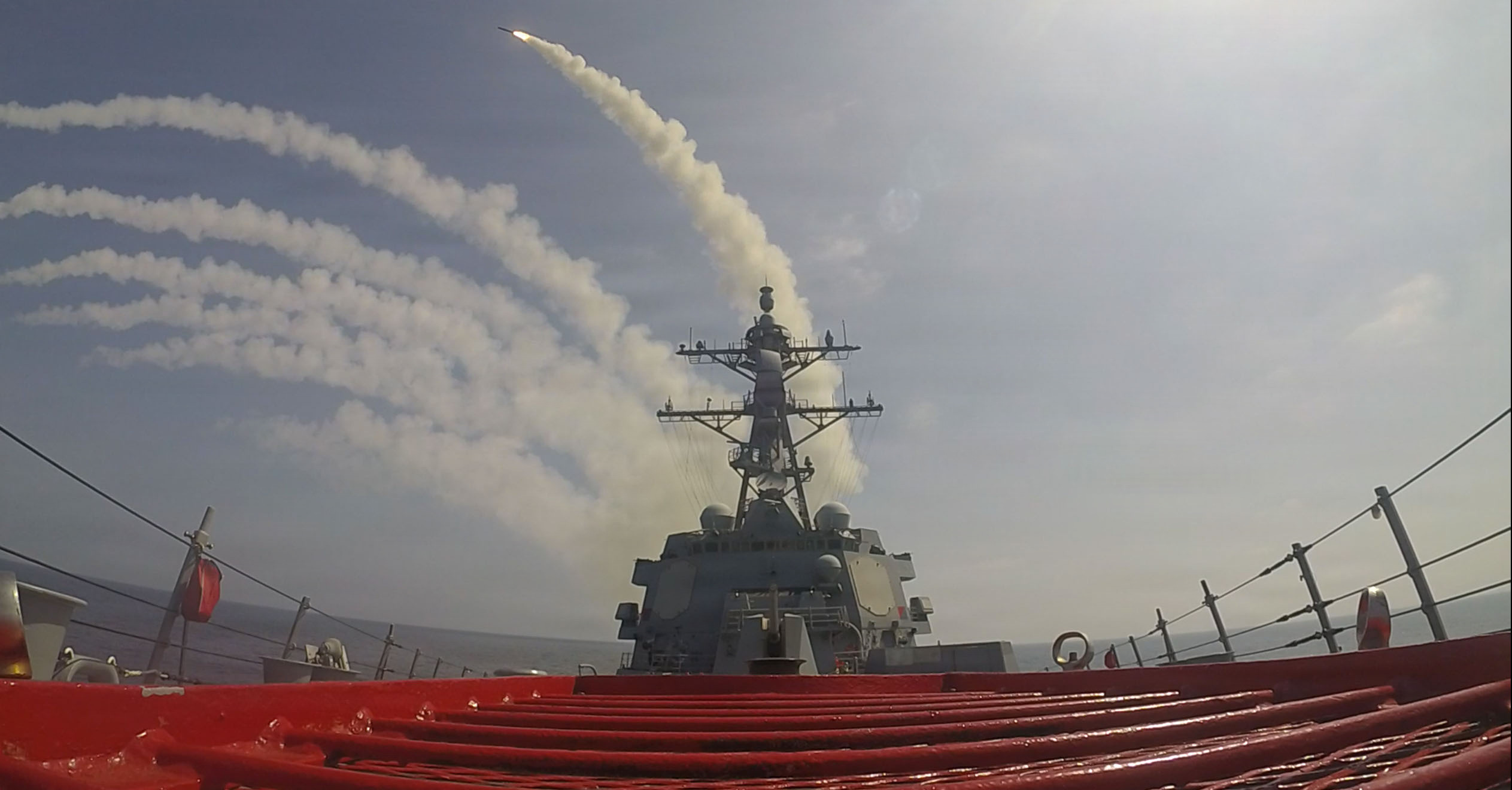
USS Frank E. Petersen Jr. fires a salvo of Tomahawk missiles in support of Operation Epic Fury on 28 February 2026

- On 21 June 2025, a US official stated that submarines fired 30 TLAM cruise missiles at Iranian nuclear sites in Natanz and Isfahan as part of a larger set of American strikes on Iranian nuclear sites.
- On 25 December 2025, more than a dozen Tomahawk missiles were launched targeting the Islamic State – West Africa Province in Northwestern Nigeria from a warship in the Gulf of Guinea.
- Beginning on 28 February 2026, the United States fired over 1,000 Tomahawk cruise missiles during Operation Epic Fury. According to the Center for Strategic and International Studies, U.S. forces fired a record number of Tomahawk missiles in the campaign. The missiles struck hundreds of targets across Iran, targeting air defense systems, ballistic missile launchers, and command-and-control facilities. The strikes included at least one Tomahawk variant with a black, presumably low-observable paint scheme and forward-swept wings, believed by some analysts to be the Maritime Strike Tomahawk variant. According to open-source investigations by Bellingcat, a US Tomahawk cruise missile struck the Shajarah Tayyebeh elementary school in Minab, Iran, on 28 February 2026, during Operation Epic Fury. Iranian authorities reported at least 175 casualties, the majority of them children, and Tomahawk missile remnants were recovered from the school site. The school was located approximately 100 meters from an IRGC facility also struck in the attack. Iran blamed the US and Israel for the deaths and President Donald Trump blamed Iran for the blast, though a preliminary US military investigation later concluded it was likely a US strike that hit the school.

Number of Tomahawk missiles fired
Operation	Target country	Year	Number
Gulf War	Iraq	January 17, 1991	288
Part of Iraq disarmament	Iraq	January 17, 1993	46
Part of Iraq disarmament	Iraq	June 26, 1993	23
Operation Deliberate Force	Bosnia-Herzegovina	September 10, 1995	13
Part of Iraq disarmament	Iraq	September 3, 1996	44
Operation Infinite Reach	Afghanistan / Sudan	August 20, 1998	79
Operation Desert Fox	Iraq	December 16, 1998	325
NATO intervention in Yugoslavia	Yugoslavia	March 24, 1999	218
Operation Enduring Freedom	Afghanistan	October 7, 2001	50
2003 invasion of Iraq	Iraq	March 20, 2003	802
Dobley airstrike	Somalia	March 3, 2008	2
Against an Al-Qaeda training camp in Yemen	Yemen	December 17, 2009	2
2011 military intervention in Libya	Libya	March 19, 2011	124
Military intervention against ISIL	Iraq	September 23, 2014	47
In response to anti-ship missiles fired by Houthis in Yemen	Yemen	October 13, 2016	5
Shayrat missile strike	Syria	April 6, 2017	59
2018 bombing of Damascus and Homs	Syria	April 13, 2018	66
2024 missile strikes in Yemen	Yemen	January 11, 2024	135
March 2025 United States attacks in Yemen	Yemen	March 15, 2025	n/a
Attack on Iranian nuclear sites	Iran	June 22, 2025	30
December 2025 United States strikes on Nigeria	Nigeria	December 25, 2025	n/a
Operation Epic Fury (Iran strikes)	Iran	February 28, 2026	> 1,000

=== United Kingdom ===
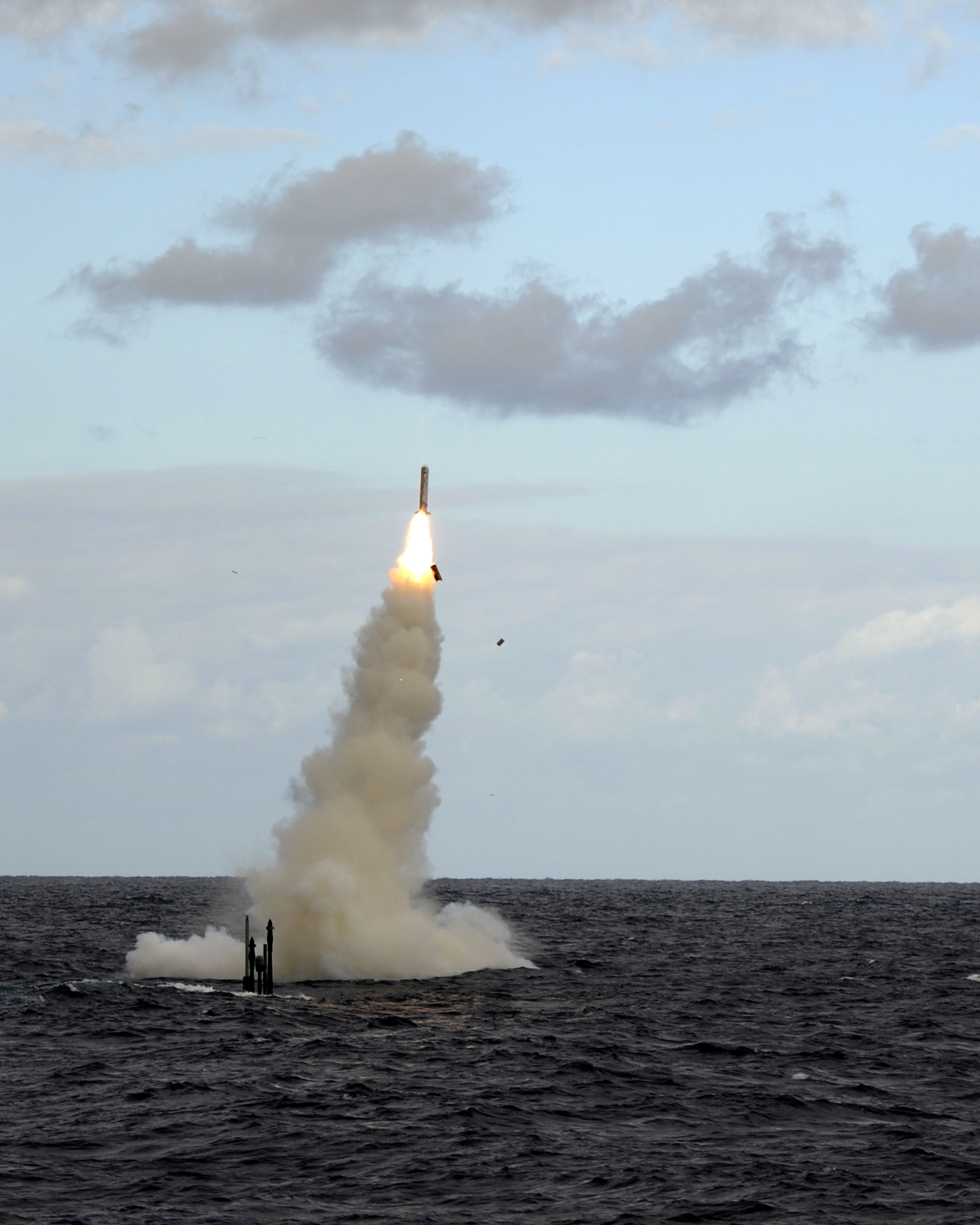
Royal Navy submarine HMS Astute fires a Tomahawk cruise missile in 2011

Royal Navy

In 1995, the US agreed to sell 65 Tomahawks to the UK for torpedo-launch from their nuclear attack submarines. The first missiles were acquired and test-fired in November 1998; all Royal Navy fleet submarines are now Tomahawk capable, including the Astute-class. The Kosovo War in 1999 saw the Swiftsure-class HMS Splendid become the first British submarine to fire the Tomahawk in combat. The UK subsequently bought 20 more Block III to replenish stocks. The Royal Navy has since fired Tomahawks during the 2000s Afghanistan War, in Operation Telic as the British contribution to the 2003 Iraq War, and during Operation Ellamy in Libya in 2011.

In April 2004, the UK and US governments reached an agreement for the British to buy 64 of the new generation of Tomahawk missile—the Block IV or TacTom missile. It entered service with the Royal Navy on 27 March 2008, three months ahead of schedule. In July 2014 the US approved the sale to the UK of a further 65 submarine-launched Block IV's at a cost of US$140m including spares and support; as of 2011 the Block III missiles were on British books at £1.1m and the Block IV at £0.87m including VAT.

The Sylver Vertical Launching System on the new Type 45 destroyer is claimed by its manufacturers to have the capability to fire the Tomahawk, although the A50 launcher carried by the Type 45 is too short for the weapon (the longer A70 silo would be required). Nevertheless, the Type 45 has been designed with weight and space margin for a strike-length Mk41 or Sylver A70 silo to be retrofitted, allowing Type 45 to use the TLAM Block IV if required. Both the new Type 26 frigates and the Type 31 frigate will be filled with strike-length Mk41 VLS.

In June 2022, the UK announced it would be upgrading its Tomahawk cruise missiles to Block V standard through a £265 million contract with the US government. The missiles will be upgraded from 2024.

=== Australia ===
Royal Australian Navy

In September 2021, Australian Prime Minister Scott Morrison announced that Australia would acquire Tomahawks for the Royal Australian Navy's (RAN) Hobart-class air warfare destroyers. In March 2023, the US State Department approved a Foreign Military Sale to Australia of up 200 Block V and up to 20 Block IV missiles worth an estimated US$895 million. In January 2024, the US State Department approved the sale of support equipment worth US$250 million.

In December 2024, Australia's Minister for Defence said the RAN had successfully fired its first ever Tomahawk missile. The missile was fired from HMAS Brisbane (DDG 41), a Hobart-class air warfare destroyer, making Australia the third nation, after the United States and UK, to acquire and fire the weapon.

=== Japan ===
Japan Maritime Self-Defense Force

The Japanese government is negotiating with the US government to purchase US-made Tomahawk cruise missiles for attacking enemy bases and counterattack purposes. The Japanese government decided to purchase the Tomahawk cruise missile before their domestic improved range "Type 12 surface-to-ship missile" start full-scale operation. Former Prime Minister Fumio Kishida announced Japan will be buying 400 Tomahawk missiles. They will be deployed in fiscal year 2026–27 and will serve as a bridge until the deployment of indigenous missiles like the extended range Type 12 surface-to-ship missile and the Hyper Velocity Gliding Projectile.

The United States Defense Security and Cooperation Agency announced on 17 November 2023, that the US State Department had approved a possible sale of up to 200 RGM-109E Tomahawk Block IV and up to 200 RGM-109E Tomahawk Block V LACMs to Japan for an estimated US$2.35 billion.

In April 2026, the United States told Japan that deliveries for its order for 400 Tomahawk missiles by March 2028 would be delayed as a result of the 2026 Iran war.

However on 31 March 2026 the Japanese Ministry of Defense has announced that the JS Chōkai (DDG-176) has completed crew training and ship modification, enabling the employment of RGM-109 Tomahawk land attack cruise missiles. Japanese destroyer Chōkai has become Japan's first vessel capable of carrying and firing U.S.-made Tomahawk missile.

Japanese destroyer JS Chōkai (DDG-176) launched a Tomahawk cruise missile for the first time on 29 July 2026, a major milestone as the archipelago country’s military works alongside the U.S. Navy to expand its capabilities.

=== Netherlands ===
Royal Netherlands Navy

After initial interest and planning (2005), the Dutch Ministry of Defence in 2023 confirmed ordering the ship launched- and submarine launched versions of the Tomahawk to be installed on both existing as well as future frigates & submarines.

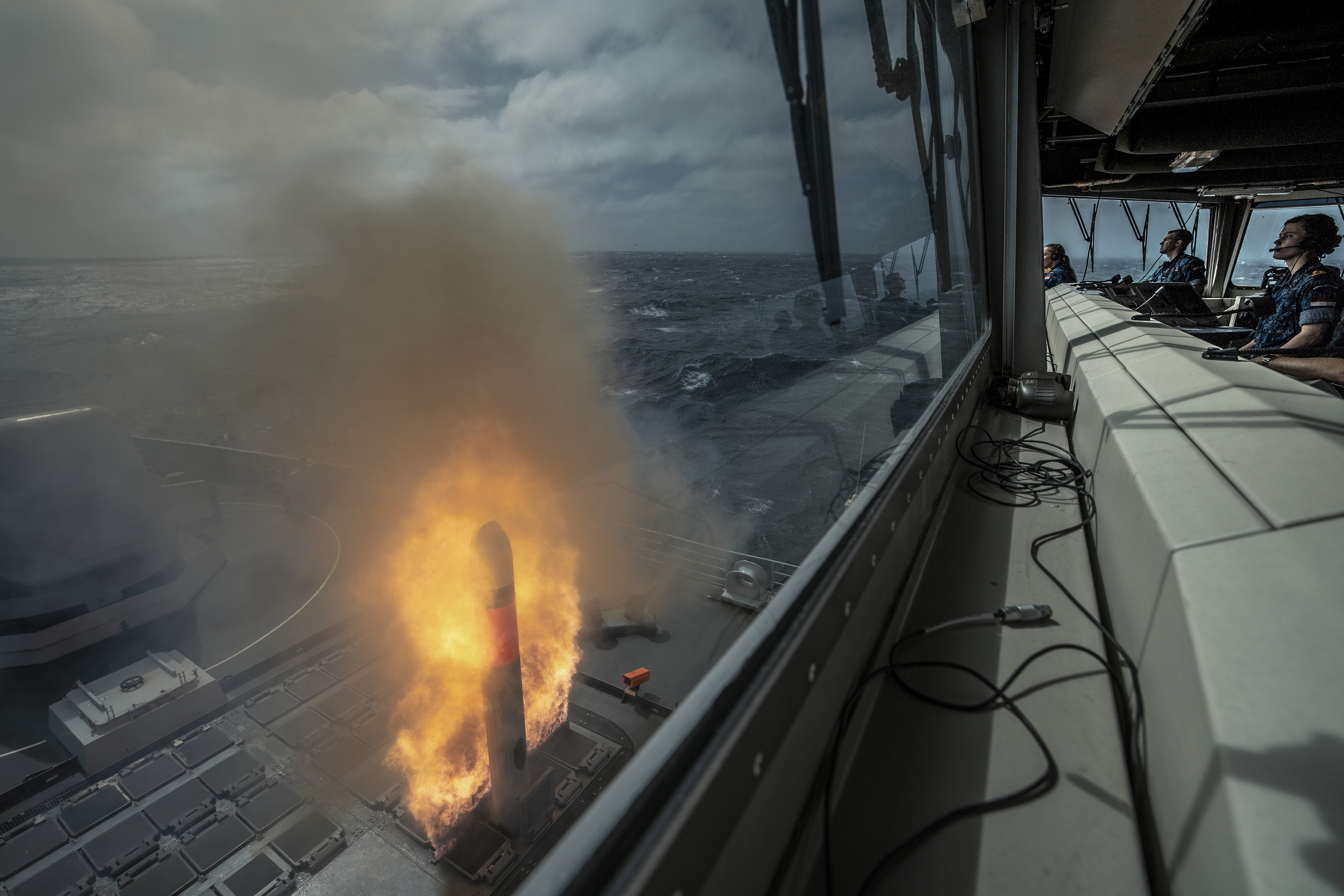
HNLMS De Ruyter launches a Tomahawk missile off the coast of Norfolk, VA (11 March 2025)

In 2022 plans for acquiring long-range and precision-guided weapon systems for the frigates and submarines of The Royal Netherlands Navy were announced as part of the Strategic Defence Review 2022, Tomahawk was identified. In March 2023, the commander of the Royal Netherlands Navy announced that the project to acquire maritime strike capability had been approved by the Ministry of Defence, and would include both the De Zeven Provinciën-class frigates and the Walrus-class submarines. While initially no announcement on missile type was made, the Tomahawk was confirmed as the frigates and submarines are equipped with US-standard Mark 41 Vertical Launching System, and torpedo tubes suited for launching UGM-109 Tomahawk respectively. In April 2023, the Netherlands Ministry of Defence announced the procurement of Tomahawk missiles. On 11 March 2025, the air defense and command frigate HNLMS De Ruyter launched a Tomahawk missile for the first time. This took place off the coast of Norfolk, United States. It was the first time a Dutch naval ship fired this type of missile.

== Potential operators ==
=== Canada ===
Royal Canadian Navy

According to infographics released by the Royal Canadian Navy in 2020, the new River-class destroyers will be equipped with the missile.

=== Germany ===
Germany

To comply with the 1987 Intermediate-Range Nuclear Forces Treaty (INF Treaty), all nuclear and conventional ground-launched ballistic missiles, cruise missiles, and missile launchers with ranges of 310 to 620 miles (500 to 1,000 km) (short to medium-range) and 620 to 3,420 miles (1,000 to 5,500 km) (intermediate-range) were dismantled or withdrawn from Europe by the treaty's deadline of 1 June 1991.

On 10 July 2024, a joint statement of the US and Germany was released, announcing the beginning of episodic deployments of long-range fires units with conventional warheads. Deployment will start from 2026, including Typhon missile launchers with SM-6 and Tomahawk missiles. This is considered as a direct response to Russia's President Vladimir Putin's call to resume production and global deployment of intermediate range missiles, two weeks prior. Putin accused the United States of already producing these missiles and pointed to the development and testing of the Typhon missile launcher. On 28 July 2024, Putin warned of a Cold War-style missile crisis and threatened to deploy long-range missiles within striking distance of the West after the United States announced its intention to deploy long-range missiles in Germany. Critics say the United States' move would trigger a new arms race.

In July 2026 the US and Germany agreed for a Tomahawk-Missiles trade.

=== Other potential operators ===
Spain was interested in acquiring the Tomahawk system in 2002 and 2005, but the order was later cancelled in 2009.

Israel developed the SLCM version of the Popeye missile after the US government in 2000 refused an Israeli request to purchase Tomahawk SLCMs because of international Missile Technology Control Regime proliferation rules.

Poland expressed interest in purchasing long-range Tomahawk missiles for its future submarines in 2015.

Brazilian Navy Tamandaré-class frigates are fitted to launch the TLAM variant, but the vessels are not yet equipped with the missile.

Ukraine is being considered as a possible operator of Tomahawk missiles, but no final decision has been made.

== See also ==
- AV-TM 300 – Brazilian cruise missile
- Babur – Pakistani land- & sea-launched cruise missile
- CJ-10 – Chinese cruise missile
- Hoveyzeh – Iranian cruise missile
- Hsiung Feng IIE – Taiwanese land-attack cruise missile
- Hyunmoo-3 – South Korean cruise missile
- Kalibr – Family of Russian cruise missiles
- Kh-55 – Family of Soviet air-launched cruise missiles
- Missile de Croisière Naval (MdCN) – French naval cruise missile
- Nirbhay – Indian subsonic cruise missile in limited service and further development
- R-360 Neptune – Ukrainian family of cruise missiles
- RK-55 – Soviet surface and submarine-launched nuclear cruise missile
