= Thor's Hammer (disambiguation) =

Thor's Hammer is a weapon in Norse mythology.

Thor's Hammer may also refer to:

== Entertainment ==
- "Thor's Hammer" (Stargate SG-1), an episode of the television program Stargate SG-1
- The Thor's Hammer Organization, principal antagonists of the Silent Storm video game series.
- Thor's Hammer (Tusenfryd), a motion-based 3D dark ride at the Tusenfryd theme park in Norway

== Landmarks ==
- Thor's Hammer, a natural rock formation in Bryce Canyon National Park
- Hammer of Thor (monument), a piled rock monument in northern Quebec, said to be of Norse construction

== Literature ==
- Thor's Hammer (novel), a science fiction novel by Wynne Whiteford
- Thor's Hammer (The Voyage of the Basset), a fantasy novel by Will Shetterly

== Music ==
- Thor's Hammer (band), a garage rock band from Iceland
- Thorr's Hammer, a death/doom band from Ballard, Washington

== Other ==
- ASCI Thor's Hammer, an internal codename for the Cray Red Storm supercomputer

== People ==
- Ingemar Johansson, former Swedish world champion in heavyweight boxing nicknamed Thor's hammer or hammer of Thor

== See also ==
- The Hammer of Thor, a fantasy novel
- "The Hammer of Thor," a song by Týr on the album Ragnarok
- Rimelands: Hammer of Thor, a 2010 role-playing mobile game.
- Mjolnir (disambiguation)
