= C12H20 =

The molecular formula C_{12}H_{20} (molar mass: 164.29 g/mol, exact mass: 164.1565 u) may refer to:

- TH-dimer, or tetrahydromethylcyclopentadiene dimer
- [4.3.3]Propellane
