= BLU-97/B Combined Effects Bomb =

Submunition used in several cluster bomb systems

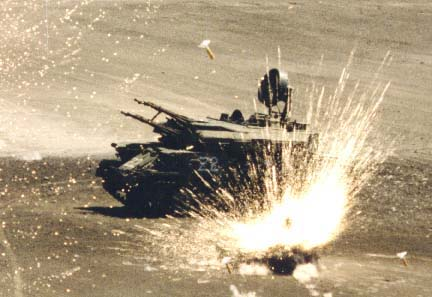
A ZSU-23-4 targeted by munitions missile AGM-154 Joint Standoff Weapon during an exercise.

The BLU-97/B Combined Effects Bomb is the submunition used in several cluster bomb type weapon systems, mainly the CBU-87 and its precision-guided version CBU-103. When the bomblets fall, they separate from the main bomb and independently free fall to the ground. They contain an inflatable bag (ballute) on the top of them, which slows them down and spreads them out. Once the bomblets reach a force of 6 Gs they arm themselves. As the bomblets fall, they are also spinning. Arming takes about 2.6 seconds. They have a combined shaped charge, fragmentation and incendiary effect on the target. It is very effective against and mainly used for anti-personnel, anti-materiel, and anti-armor.

Over two million of these sub-munitions were dropped over Kuwait and Iraq during the Gulf War. A 5% dud rate was expected, so around 100,000 unexploded bomblets remained after the war. Each was fitted with an extremely sensitive fuze and the US Army recommended that they not be moved. Clearing this unexploded ordnance resulted in several accidents. On one occasion, seven US combat engineers from Company A of the 27th Engineer Battalion died attempting to clear the runway at the As Salam airbase in Iraq.

In 2003 humanitarian groups expressed concern that the BLU-97/B bomblets were the same size and color as food rations given to children in Afghanistan. Although the latter are square and the former cylindrical, both are dropped from U.S. planes and both are yellow so that they are easy to spot on the ground. The United States responded to the criticism by changing the color of future food packages and warning civilians through announcements and flyers. Pentagon officials also said that the packages had not been dropped in the same areas as cluster bombs.

According to NYT investigation, the explosive-ordnance disposal officers who cleaned up the impact areas indicated a dud rate of 17%

== Specifications ==
- Length:
  - Stored: 16.8 cm (6.6 in)
  - Deployed (w/o retarder canopy): 22.6 cm (8.9 in)
- Diameter: 63.5 mm (2.5 in)
- Weight: 1.54 kg (3.4 lb)
- Explosive:
  - Standard: 287 g (0.63 lb) Cyclotol
  - Insensitive Munitions (IM) version: PBXN-107
- Warhead: Shaped charge, fragmenting casing and incendiary zirconium ring.

== Weapon systems ==
- CBU-87/ CBU-103/ CBU-113 Combined Effects Munition — contains 202 bomblets
- RGM/UGM-109D Tomahawk — contains 166 bomblets
- AGM-154A Joint Standoff Weapon — contains 145 bomblets
- AGM-137 TSSAM — never entered service
