= Mjolnir (disambiguation) =

Mjölnir is the hammer of Thor in Norse mythology.

Mjolnir may also refer to:

- 85585 Mjolnir, an Apollo asteroid
- Mjølnir impact crater, off the coast of Norway
- Bombkapsel 90 stand off submunition dispenser
- "Halo Theme MJOLNIR Mix", a piece in the soundtrack of Halo 2
- Granatkastarpansarbandvagn (Grkpbv) 90, a Swedish variant of the Combat Vehicle 90
- Mjölnir, a follow-on prototype to THOR, a directed-energy weapon
- MJOLNIR battle armor, the combat suit from the Halo video games
- Mjolnir (comics), Thor's hammer as depicted in Marvel Comics
- Marie Mjolnir, a character in the manga/anime Soul Eater
- HNoMS Mjølner, a Norwegian Monitor type warship
- Mjölnir, pseudonym of Nazi propagandist Hans Schweitzer
- Mjolnir LLC, a gaming company

== See also ==
- Thor's Hammer (disambiguation)
