= CBU-87 Combined Effects Munition =

United States Air Force cluster bomb

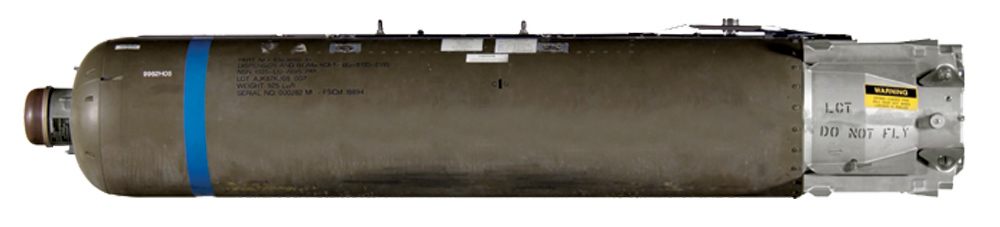
- CBU-103 (CBU-87 with Wind Corrected Munitions Dispenser kit)
- Type: Cluster munition
- Place of origin: United States

Service history
- In service: Since 1986
- Used by: United States; Egypt; Netherlands; Saudi Arabia; Turkey
- Wars: Gulf War; Operation Allied Force; 2003 invasion of Iraq; Operation Sinai

Production history
- Designer: Honeywell Defense and Marine Systems
- Designed: Early 1980s
- Manufacturer: Northrop Grumman

Specifications
- Mass: 950 lb (430 kg)
- Length: 7 ft 8 in (2.33 m)
- Diameter: 15.6 in (396 mm)
- Warhead: 202 BLU-97/B submunitions bomblets
- Launch platform: AV-8B, A-10, B-1B, B-52, F-15E, F-16, F/A-18C/D & F/A-18E/F
- References: Janes

BLU-97/B CEM
- Type: Cluster submunition
- Place of origin: United States

Production history
- Designed: Early 1980s
- Manufacturer: General Dynamics Ordnance and Tactical Systems

Specifications
- Mass: 3.3 lb (1.5 kg)
- Length: 6.7 in (169 mm) stowed; 14.0 in (356 mm) extended
- Diameter: 2.5 in (64 mm)
- Warhead: 70/30 cyclotol/zirconium
- Warhead weight: 10.1 oz (287 g)
- References: Janes

The CBU-87 Combined Effects Munition (CEM) is a cluster bomb used by the United States Air Force, developed by Aerojet General/Honeywell and introduced in 1986 to replace the earlier cluster bombs used in the Vietnam War. CBU stands for Cluster Bomb Unit. When the CBU-87 is used in conjunction with the Wind Corrected Munitions Dispenser guidance tail kit, it becomes much more accurate, and is designated CBU-103; and when the CBU-87 is used in conjunction with the Wind Corrected Munitions Dispenser-Extended Range guidance tail kit, it is designated CBU-113/B.

The basic CBU-87 is designed to be dropped from an aircraft at any altitude and any air speed. It is a free-falling bomb and relies on the aircraft to aim it before it drops; once dropped it needs no further instruction, as opposed to guided munitions or smart bombs. The bomb can be dropped by a variety of modern-day aircraft. It is 7 feet 7 inches (2.31 meters) long, has a diameter of 16 inches (41 centimeters), and weighs roughly 951 pounds (431 kg). The price is US$14,000 per bomb.

Each CBU-87 consists of an SUU-65B canister, a fuze with 12 time delay options and 202 submunitions (or bomblets) designated BLU-97/B Combined Effects Bomb. Each bomblet is a yellow cylinder with a length of 20 centimeters (7.87 inches) and a diameter of 6 centimeters (2.36 inches). The BLU-97/B bomblets are designed to be used against armor, people and soft skinned targets and consist of a shaped charge, a scored steel fragmentation case and a zirconium ring for incendiary effects. The CBU-87 can also be equipped with an optional FZU-39/B proximity sensor with 10 altitude selections.

When dropped from an aircraft, the bomb starts spinning. There are 6 speeds that can adjust the bomb's rate of spin. After it drops to a certain altitude, the canister breaks open and the submunitions are released. Each bomblet has a ring of tabs at the tail end; these orient the bomblet and deploy an inflatable decelerator to decrease the falling speed of the bomblet. When the submunitions hit the ground, they will cover a large area and the CBU-87 can be adjusted so it can cover a smaller or wider area. Depending on the rate of spin and the altitude at which the canister opens, it can cover an area between 20×20 meters (65x65 feet) (low release altitude and a slow rate of spin) to 120×240 meters (393x787 feet) (high release altitude and a high rate of spin).

Manufacturers and the Department of Defense have claimed that each bomb's failure rate is about 5%. This equates to about 10 bomblets not exploding on impact of the 202 bomblets dropped. Landmine Action claimed the failure rate of the BLU-97/Bs used in the Kosovo campaign was higher, between 7 and 8 percent.

== Operational use ==
During Operation Desert Storm, the US Air Force dropped 10,035 CBU-87s. During Operation Allied Force, the US dropped about 1,100 cluster bombs, mostly CBU-87s.

On 7 May 1999, a CBU-87 was used in one of the most serious incidents involving civilian deaths and cluster bombs, the Niš cluster bombing.

== See also ==
- CBU-97 Sensor Fuzed Weapon, a cluster bomb with smart submunitions.

== Bibliography ==
- "Equipment guide." Military.com. 25 Mar 2007
- Vipers in the Storm, "Weapons Bunker." 25 Mar 2007
