= AGM-154 Joint Standoff Weapon =

Type of glide bomb

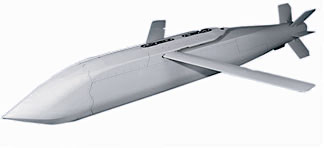
- Type: Guided glide bomb

Service history
- In service: December 1998 – present
- Used by: United States Armed Forces; Republic of China Air Force; Royal Canadian Air Force; Finnish Air Force; Polish Air Force; Hellenic Air Force; Royal Australian Air Force; Royal Moroccan Air Force; Turkish Air Force; Republic of Singapore Air Force
- Wars: Operation Desert Fox; Operation Southern Watch; NATO bombing of Yugoslavia; War in Afghanistan (2001–2021); Iraq War; Operation Rough Rider

Production history
- Manufacturer: Raytheon
- Unit cost: AUPP AGM-154A: $282,000; AGM-154B: $484,167; AGM-154C: $719,012

Specifications
- Mass: 483 to 497 kg (1,065 to 1,095 lb)
- Length: 4.1 m (160 in)
- Diameter: 330 mm (13 in)
- Wingspan: 2.7 m (106 in)
- Warhead: BLU-97/B - Combined Effects Bomblets (JSOW A); BLU-108 - Sensor fused weapon (JSOW B - now cancelled); BROACH multi-stage warhead (JSOW C)
- Operational range: low altitude release: 22 km (12 nmi) high altitude release: 130 km (70 nmi)
- Guidance system: Inertial Navigation System coupled with Global Positioning System, terminal Infrared homing (AGM-154C Only)

The AGM-154 Joint Standoff Weapon (JSOW) is a glide bomb that resulted from a joint venture between the United States Navy and Air Force to deploy a standardized medium-range precision-guided weapon, especially for engagement of defended targets from outside the range of standard anti-aircraft defenses, thereby increasing aircraft survivability and minimizing friendly losses. It is intended to be used against soft targets such as parked aircraft, trucks, armored personnel carriers (APCs), and surface-to-air missile sites (SAMs). Prior to launch, it is given a destination through either a predesignated waypoint or a point marked through a targeting pod. It glides, using two wings that pop out for added lift, to the marked destination and dispenses submunitions in a short, roughly linear pattern.

The designation of the Joint Standoff Weapon as an "air-to-ground missile" is a misnomer, as it is an unpowered bomb with guidance avionics, similar to the older GBU-15.

== Development ==
The JSOW is a fire-and-forget weapon that employs a tightly coupled GPS/INS for navigation, and is capable of day/night and adverse weather operations. The JSOW-C adds an infra-red seeker for terminal guidance.

Originally the JSOW was developed by Defense Systems & Electronics division of Texas Instruments. After a first flight, funded by the company in April 1991, a joint program between the US Navy and the US Air Force was awarded. Two other teams had bid on the contract. Texas Instruments sold its defense division to Raytheon in January 1997.

US Navy commenced Operational Evaluation (OPEVAL) in February 1997 and JSOW entered operational service in January 1999. The Joint Standoff Weapon is currently used by the US Navy. Foreign Military Sales have been signed with Poland and Turkey for use with their F-16 fighters. Finland, Greece and Singapore are pursuing FMS cases at this time. (Finland cleared the FMS procedure and made the purchase for JSOW as well as JASSM and JDAM in 2017.) The JSOW family is a 450 kg (1,000 lb) class weapon intended to provide a low cost, highly lethal air-to-surface glide bomb with standoff capabilities from 28 km (15 nmi) low altitude launch and up to 110 km (60 nmi) high altitude launch. The JSOW can be used against a variety of land targets and operates from ranges outside enemy point defenses.

The JSOW is just over 4.1 m (160 in) in length and weighs about 450 kg (1,000 lb). The JSOW was originally to be delivered in three variants, each of which uses a common air vehicle, or truck, while substituting various payloads. The AGM-154A (JSOW-A) entered service in 1999. US Navy and Air Force developed the AGM-154B (JSOW B) up until Multi-Service Operational Test & Evaluation (MOT&E) but the Navy decided not to procure the weapon when the Air Force left the program. The AGM-154C (JSOW BROACH) entered service in February 2005.

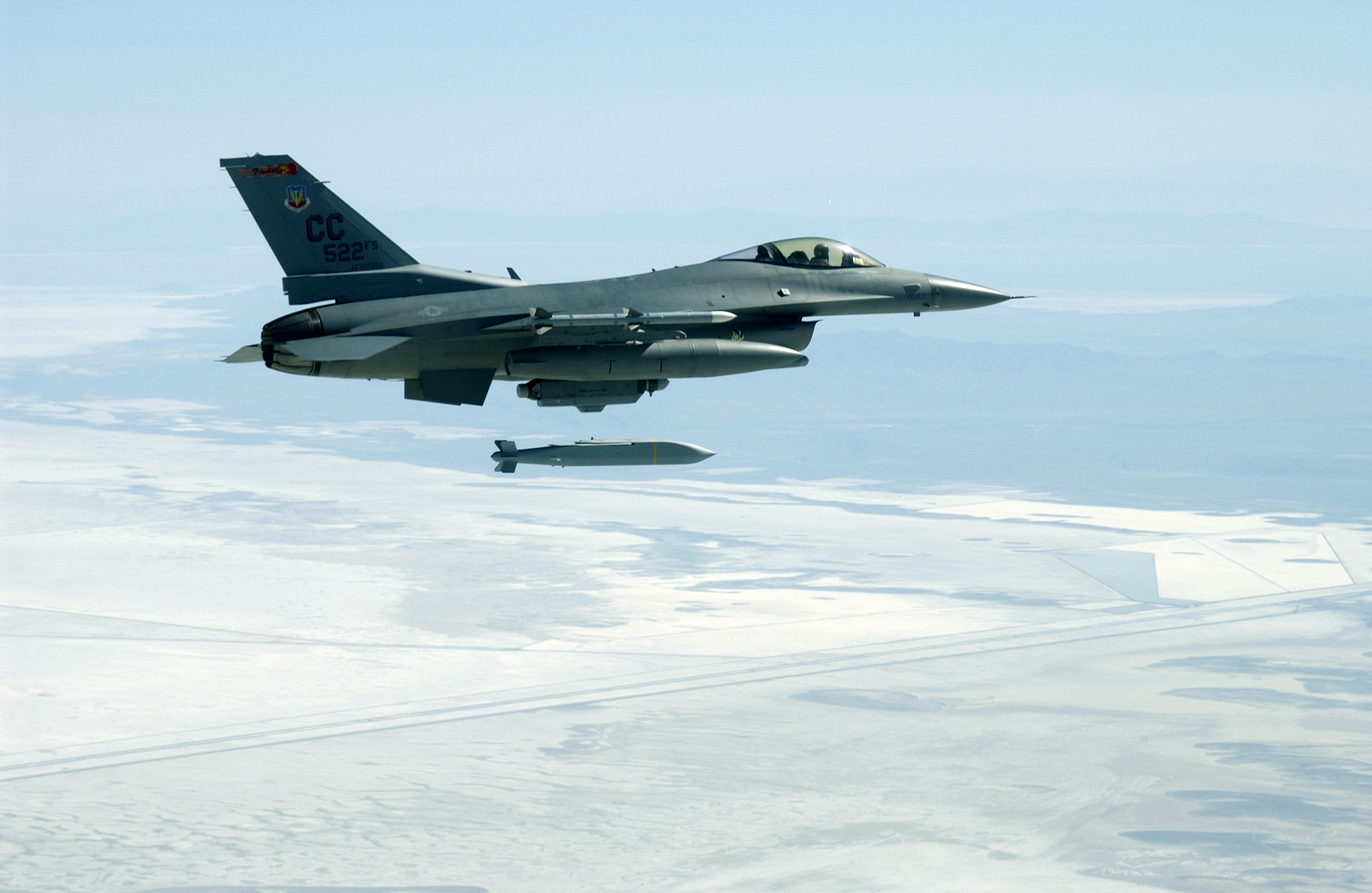
An F-16C releases an AGM-154 JSOW over the Utah Test and Training Range

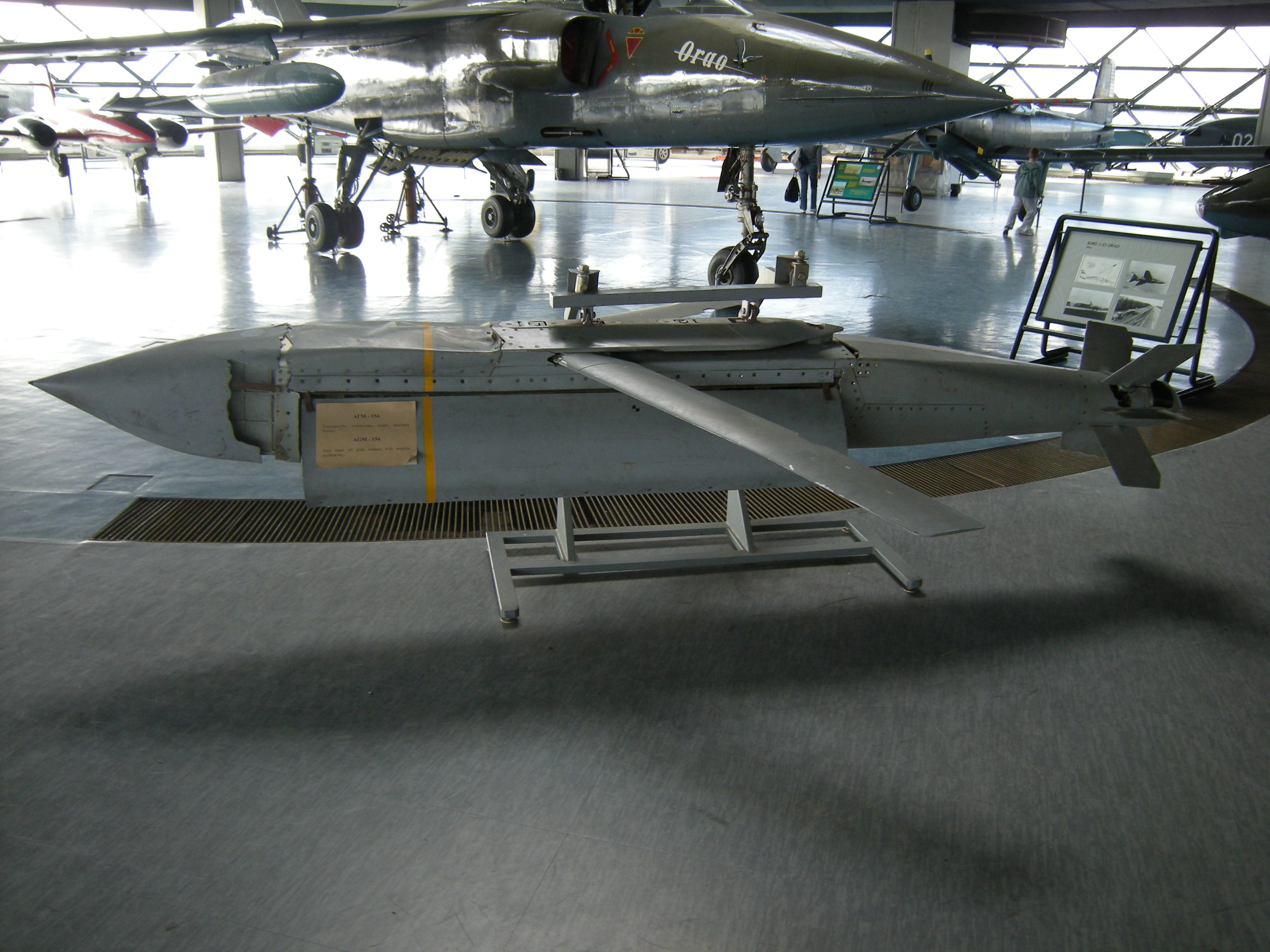
An expended sub-munition AGM-154 JSOW used during Operation Allied Force, on display at the Belgrade Aviation Museum in Serbia.

During the 1990s, the JSOW was considered to be one of the most successful development programs in DOD history. The system was introduced to operational use a year ahead of schedule. Unlike most guided weapons and aircraft, the system never had a weight management problem, and was deployed at its target weight. The system introduced a new type of fuze, but was able to obtain authority from an independent safety review in record time. Many observers credited these accomplishments to the management style chosen by the DOD and Texas Instruments. After a competitive selection, the program staff was organized into integrated product teams with members from the government, the prime contractor Texas Instruments, and subcontractors. In one case, the prime contractor determined that the best-in-class supplier for a design service was the government, and gave part of its funding back. JSOW was recognized in 1996 with a Laurels Award from Aviation Week & Space Technology. It is notable for a guided weapon to receive this award, which is normally reserved for much larger systems. Because of this history, JSOW has been used as a case study for development programs, and for Integrated Product Teams, and is sometimes cited in academic research on program management.

== Variants ==
=== AGM-154A (baseline JSOW) ===
The warhead of the AGM-154A consists of 145 BLU-97/B Combined Effects Bomb (CEB) submunitions. These bomblets have a shaped charge for armor defeating capability, a fragmenting case for material destruction, and a zirconium ring for incendiary effects.

=== AGM-154B (anti-armor) ===
The warhead for the AGM-154B is the BLU-108/B from the Air Force's Sensor Fuzed Weapon (SFW) program. The JSOW B was to carry six BLU-108/B submunitions. Each submunition releases four projectiles (total of 24 per weapon) that use infrared sensors to detect targets. When a submunition detects that it is aligned with a target, it fires, creating an explosively formed penetrator capable of defeating vehicle armor. This program concluded development but the Navy decided not to procure the weapon.

=== AGM-154C (unitary variant) ===
The AGM-154C uses an Imaging Infrared (IIR) terminal seeker with autonomous guidance. The AGM-154C carries the BROACH warhead. This two stage 225 kg (500 lb) warhead is made up from a WDU-44 shaped augmenting warhead and a WDU-45 follow through bomb. The weapon is designed to attack hardened targets. It entered service with the US Navy in February 2005.

== Production and upgrades ==
Full rate production started on December 29, 1999. In June 2000, Raytheon was contracted to develop an enhanced electronics package for the JSOW to prevent electronic spoofing of GPS signals. This ultimately resulted in the JSOW Block II weapon, incorporating multiple cost reduction initiatives in addition to the Selective Availability Anti-Spoofing Module (SAASM) capability. JSOW Block II was scheduled to begin production in March 2007.

The JSOW contains a modular control and deployment interface that allows future enhancement and additional configurations since it is likely that additional variants will emerge. The basic airframe is advertised as a "truck" and the JSOW-as-a-truck capability is widely advertised. Raytheon has placed a tremendous investment in the JSOW program and will certainly try to extend the Department of Defense contracts for as long as possible with system upgrades and repackagings for new missions and targets.

=== JSOW Block III (JSOW-C1) ===
The AGM-154C-1 was scheduled to begin production in 2009. The first launch was conducted in August 2011 from an F/A-18F. The JSOW-C1 completed integrated test and evaluations in January 2015, moving on to operational tests. The C1 version is slated for delivery in 2016. It achieved Initial Operating Capability (IOC) on 22 June 2016. On 11 October 2017 the Department of the Navy declared the Joint Standoff Weapon (JSOW) C-1 ready for full operational capability.

=== AGM-154A-1 (JSOW-A1) ===
In addition, the AGM-154A-1 configuration is under development by Raytheon for FMS sales. This version replaces the submunition payload of the AGM-154A with a BLU-111 warhead to enhance blast-fragmentation effects without the unexploded ordnance (UXO) concerns with the BLU-97/B payload.

=== Powered JSOW (JSOW-ER) ===
A Pratt & Whitney TJ-150 turbojet engine for a powered JSOW is being tested. This variant is named JSOW-ER, where "ER" is for "extended range". JSOW-ER will increase range from 130 to 560 km (70 to 300 nmi). In February, 2019, the US Navy announced that it would issue a sole-source contract to Raytheon to build an improved JSOW-ER to be placed in service by the end of FY2023.

The US Navy eventually scrapped plans to develop the JSOW-ER in its FY2022 budget, instead opting to procure a variant of Lockheed Martin's AGM-158B Joint Air-to-Surface Standoff Missile Extended Range (JASSM-ER) cruise missile to meet both its strike and offensive anti-surface warfare (OASuW) requirements. It is also expected to leverage technology from the AGM-158C Long Range Anti-Ship Missile (LRASM), itself a JASSM-ER derivative.

== Combat history ==
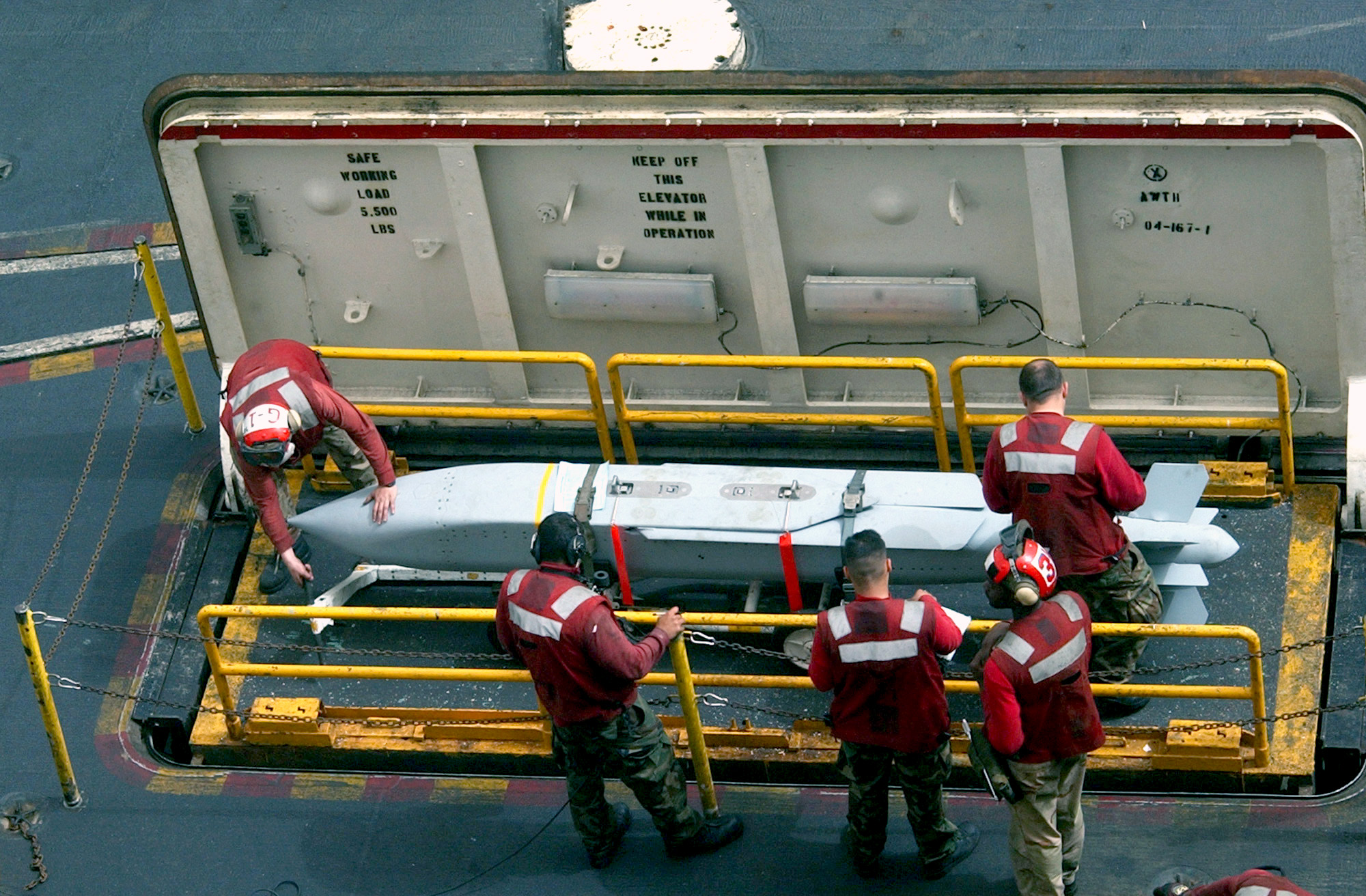
AGM-154 being brought to the flight deck of an aircraft carrier

The AGM-154A was the first variant to be used in combat. The AGM-154A is usually used for Suppression of Enemy Air Defenses missions. Initial deployment testing occurred aboard USS Nimitz and later aboard the USS Dwight D. Eisenhower. The first combat deployment of the JSOW occurred over southern Iraq on December 17, 1998, when launched by a single F/A-18C from the "Checkerboards" of VMFA-312, Carrier Air Wing Three embarked aboard USS Enterprise during Operation Desert Fox. The glide range of the JSOW allowed the weapon to strike a target located in the southern suburbs of Baghdad. This weapon has enjoyed success since its early use. One adverse event occurred in February 2001, when a strike of F/A-18s from the USS Harry S. Truman battle group launched a massive attack on Iraqi air-defense sites, nearly every weapon missed the target. The cause of the miss was reported as a software problem. This problem was solved soon afterward. Since 1998, at least 400 of the JSOW weapons have been used in the following conflicts: Operation Desert Fox, Operation Southern Watch, NATO Operation Allied Force, Operation Enduring Freedom, Operation Iraqi Freedom and Operation Rough Rider.

== Operators ==
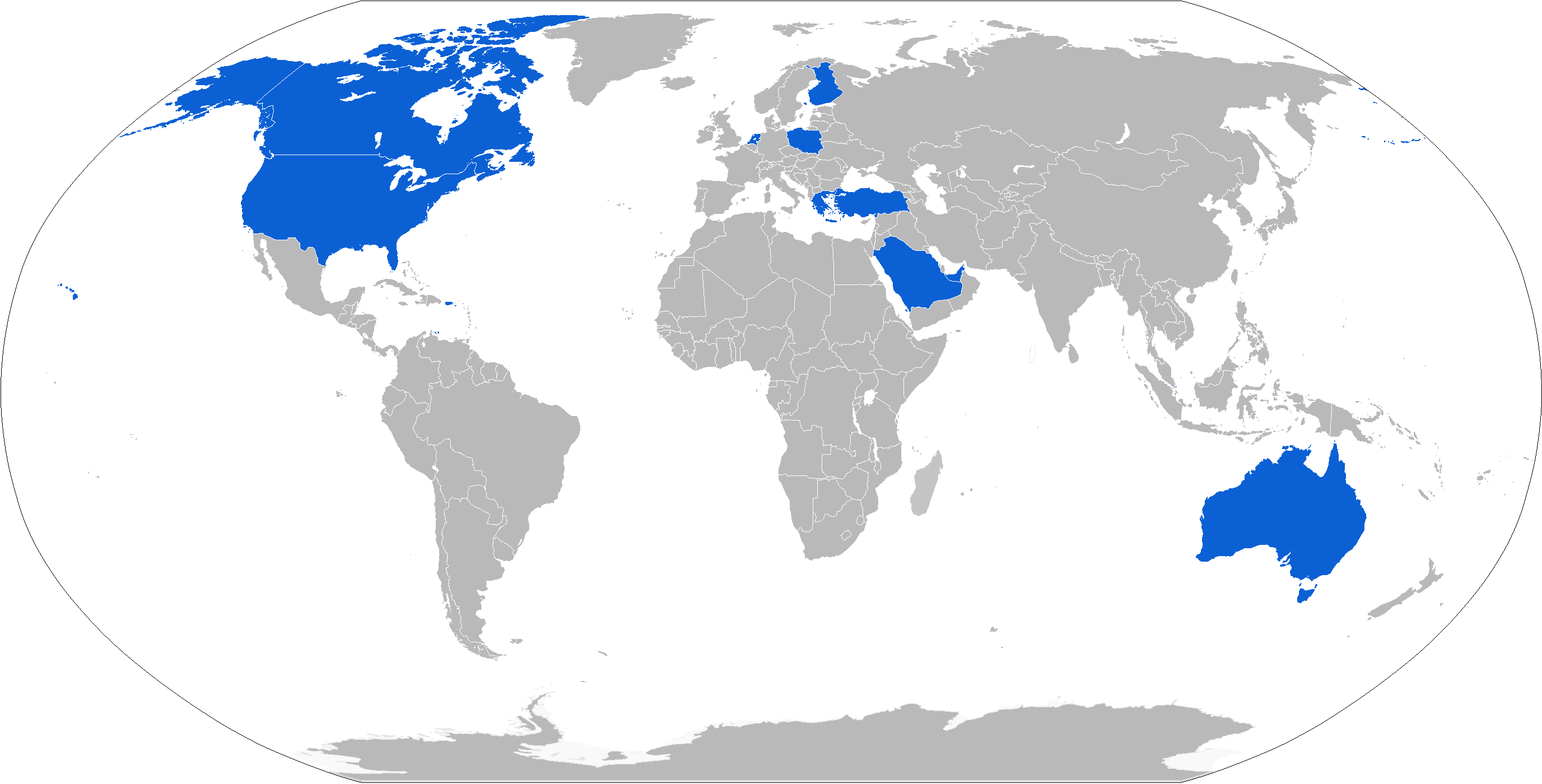
Map with AGM-154 operators in blue

=== Current operators ===
- Australia: AGM-154C upgraded to Block III
- Canada
- Finland
- Greece
- Italy: AGM-154A
- Morocco
- Netherlands
- Poland
- Qatar
- Saudi Arabia
- Singapore
- Taiwan: AGM-154C
- Turkey
- Ukraine – On 26 September 2024, the US government announced a new military aid package to Ukraine that included JSOWs.
- United Arab Emirates
- United States;

Side notes

1. USAF terminated production of JSOW in FY 2005, leaving the USN and USMC as the only U.S. services obtaining new JSOWs.
2. According to a test report conducted by the United States Navy's Weapon System Explosives Safety Review Board (WSESRB) established in the wake of the 1967 USS Forrestal fire, the cooking off time for a JSOW is approximately 2 minutes 11 seconds.

== General characteristics ==
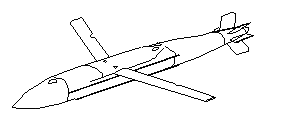
Outline drawing of the AGM-154A JSOW

- Primary Function: Air-to-surface Standoff from Point Defense (SOPD) weapon, for use against a variety of targets.
- Contractor: Raytheon Co.
- Guidance: GPS/INS (Global Position/Inertial), Terminal infrared homing Seeker (unique to 'C' model)
- Length: 4.1 m (160 in)
- Diameter: box shaped 330 mm (13 in) on a side / other source 406 mm × 519 mm (16.0 in × 20.4 in)
- Weight: From 483 to 497 kg (1,065 to 1,095 lb)
- Wingspan: 2.7 m (106 in)
- Aircraft Compatibility:
  - Navy: F/A-18C/D, F/A-18E/F
  - Air Force: F-16 Block 40/50/60, B-1B, B-2A, B-52H, F-15E, F-35A/C
  - Other: JAS 39 Gripen
- Range:
  - Low altitude launch - 22 km (12 nmi)
  - High altitude launch - 130 km (70 nmi)
- Warhead(s):
  - BLU-97/B - Combined Effects Bomblets (JSOW A)
  - BLU-111/B - Unitary warhead (JSOW-A1)
  - BLU-108 - Sensor fused weapon (JSOW B - now cancelled)
  - BROACH multi-stage warhead (JSOW C)
- Unit Cost:
  - AUPP AGM-154A, $282,000. Total program cost: $3,327,000.
  - AGM-154B, $484,167. Total program cost: $2,033,500.
  - AGM-154C, $719,012. Total program cost: $5,608,000.
- Date Deployed: January 1999

== See also ==
- Glide bomb
- CS/BBC5 – (China)
- Bombkapsel 90 – (Germany)
- HOPE/HOSBO – (Germany)
- H-2 SOW – (Pakistan)
- H-4 SOW – (Pakistan)
- KGGB – (South Korea)
- GB6 – (China)
