= BROACH warhead =

Multi-stage warhead

The Bomb Royal Ordnance Augmented Charge (BROACH) is a multi-stage warhead developed by BAE Systems Global Combat Systems Munitions, Thales Missile Electronics and QinetiQ.

Development of BROACH began in 1991 when Team BROACH consisted of British Aerospace Royal Ordnance Defence, Thomson-Thorn Missile Electronics and the Defence Evaluation and Research Agency (DERA). The two stage warhead is made up from an initial shaped charge, which cuts a passage through armour, concrete, earth, etc., allowing a larger following warhead to penetrate inside the target. The weapon is designed to allow a cruise missile to achieve the degree of hard-target penetration formerly only possible by the use of laser-guided gravity bombs.

== Applications ==
- Storm Shadow/SCALP EG
- AGM-154 Joint Standoff Weapon unitary variant (JSOW-C)
- BROACH was evaluated as a possible warhead for the AGM-86 ALCM cruise missile but was ultimately not selected.
