= Rimelands: Hammer of Thor =

2010 video game

- Developer: Dicework Games
- Publisher: Crescent Moon Games
- Platform: iOS
- Release: September 2, 2010
- Genre: Role-playing / Turn-based strategy

Rimelands: Hammer of Thor is a role-playing iOS game developed by Finnish studio Dicework Games and released by Crescent Moon Games LLC on September 2, 2010.

== Critical reception ==
The game has a rating of 89% on Metacritic based on 11 critic reviews.

AppSmile said "With simple controls, an engaging combat system and some great graphics, this game should please both casual iPhone gamers as well as hardcore RPG veterans. " SlidetoPlay said "Rimelands is a highly original RPG that combines dice-rolling chance with player-driven decisions." NDPad said "Small annoyances aside, Rimelands: Hammer of Thor is simply one of the highest quality traditional role-playing game experiences available on the app store. It's tough as nails, but the combat have you coming back for more." 148Apps wrote "Rimelands is the first turn based RPG that I didn't feel constrained by the controls or game speed. On top of that, there is a good story, there are good characters, good combat, good level designs, and good graphics. " AppSafari said "This is a really strong entry from Crescent Moon Games." TouchArcade wrote "I don't typically love turn-based strategy games, but Rimelands had me hooked almost instantly. "

Pocket Gamer UK said "Rimelands: Hammer of Thor fits snugly into the turn-based role-playing genre, but offers enough variation to keep the action fresh and exciting." TouchGen wrote "Rimelands : Hammer of Thor is an extremely enjoyable game due to keeping the challenge going, and I really hope to be able to continue the adventure. Not because I care about the story, but rather because the game mechanic works well." AppSpy wrote "Rimelands: Hammer of Thor is an excellent turn-based RPG with an amazingly simple combat system that only gets better as you delve deeper in to your chosen character path." ZTGD wrote "Still, if you're an RPG enthusiast and you're looking for an experience that's well suited to the iPhone rather than simply mimicking the console, it would be disingenuous to steer you elsewhere." Multiplayer.it wrote "Hammer of Thor is a great first entry in the Rimelands series. Thanks to its charming dice combat system and the articulated skill tree, it is without any doubt one of the most enjoyable RPGs on the App Store. However, the game greatly stumbles in its storytelling, boring and full of clichés, while the adventure is too much linear and there are very few secondary missions."
