= Thor's Hammer (novel) =

1983 novel by Wynne Whiteford

- Author: Wynne Whiteford
- Language: English
- Publication date: 1983

Thor's Hammer is a 1983 science fiction novel by Australian author Wynne Whiteford, about mining in the asteroids.

It describes an attempt by an unbalanced fanatic stationed in the asteroid belt to destroy Earth civilisation by directing an asteroid at Earth.

== See also ==
- Thor's Hammer, the mythological weapon wielded by Thor
- Asteroids in fiction
