= Bombkapsel 90 =

Cluster bomb in the Swedish Air Force

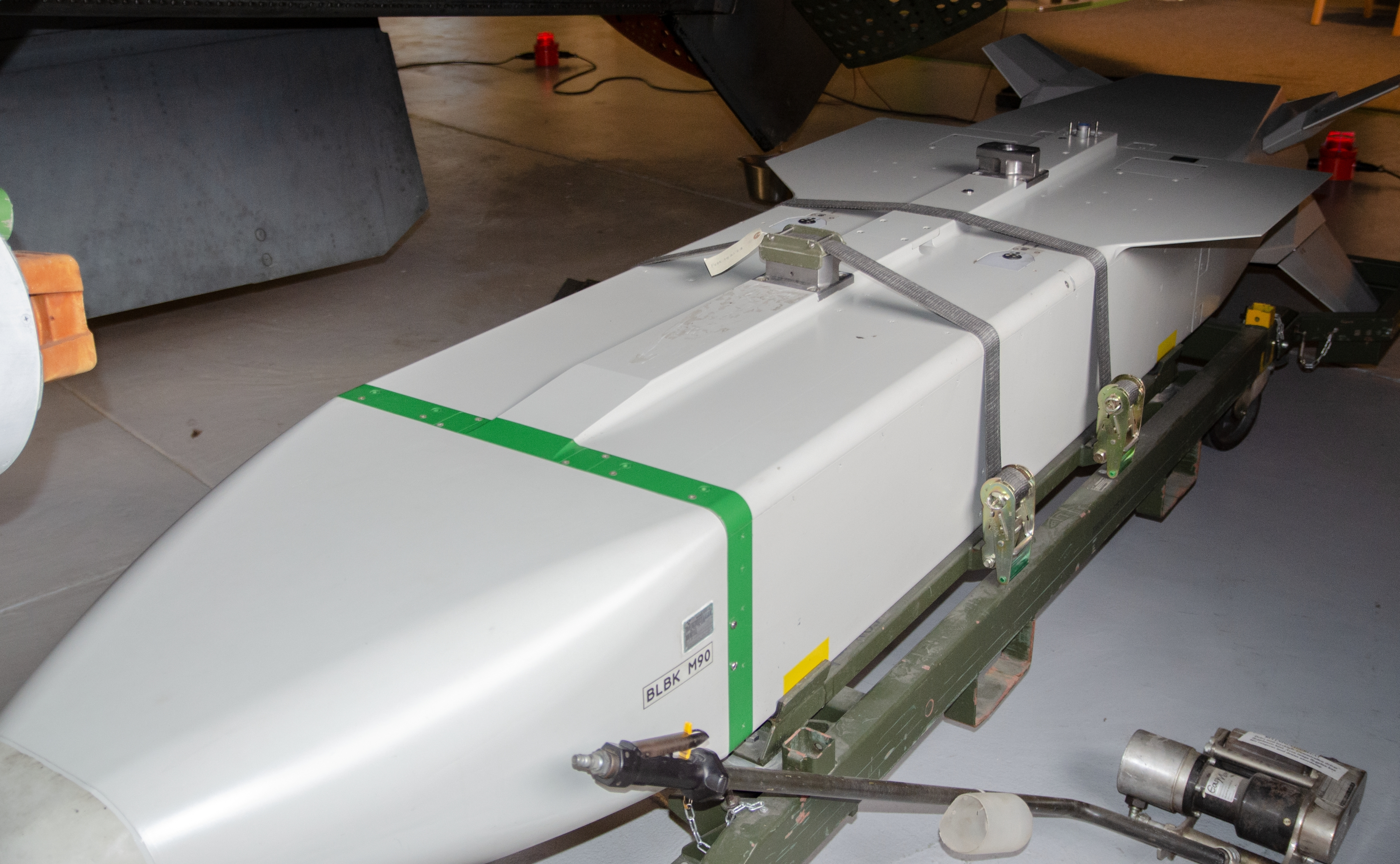
Bombkapsel 90

Bombkapsel 90 (BK90) is the Swedish Air Force's nomenclature for a gliding stand-off submunitions dispenser, or cluster bomb, with 72 submunitions. It is manufactured by DaimlerChrysler Aerospace in Germany by the name of DWS 24 - Dispenser Weapon System 24 barrels. The BK90 is also commonly known as DWS 39 Mjölner because it was intended for use with the Saab JAS 39 Gripen. Later variants of the Saab 37 Viggen, specifically the AJS37, were also equipped with BK90 submunition dispensers. In the future it could be also integrated on the Eurofighter Typhoon. Its design is very similar to that of the American AGM-154 Joint Standoff Weapon.

It had been in service with the Swedish JAS 39 Gripen and AJS 37 Viggen aircraft, but was withdrawn after the government of Sweden decided to sign the Convention on Cluster Munitions banning the use of BK90. In conjunction with the LITENING targeting pod, the weapon is currently operational with the Hellenic Air Force carried both by the F-4E PI-2000 AUP and the now retired A-7E Corsair II.

== Background and reason for development ==
The main task for the Swedish Armed Forces has, for a long time, been to repel a potential foreign invading force. This means all weapon systems are designed for use within Sweden's national borders. "Cluster bombs" has been notorious for leaving active un-exploded ordnance (UXO) after the fuses failed to detonate upon impact, and for that reason all weapons using sub-munitions for a long time were rejected by the Försvarets Materielverk Defence Materiel Administration deeming it an unacceptable risk.

There was a significant need for a weapon that have a smaller risk area than a bomb (sometimes called a mine-bomb in Swedish literature, meaning a thin walled bomb that relies solely on the blast wave), and have the capacity to destroy a large number of targets attacking in mass. A project to develop such a weapon was initiated in cooperation with a weapons manufacturer. The system was called a sub-munition dispenser to clarify the difference between it and an older type cluster weapon. A significant amount of resources was devoted to developing this system, and to make sure that no matter what happened, an UXO would never become active and pose a danger to the civilian populace.

Unlike the cluster weapons common at the time, every component in this sub-munitions dispenser has been designed so that it cannot leave active, un-exploded sub-munitions. For example, a sub-munition cannot detonate without a correct launch indication. If a faulty sub-munition was to be launched from the pod and by some unlikely event become active on the ground, the internal system has been designed so that the sub-munition cannot detonate for any reason, since it didn't receive a correct launch indication. There are many other design features resulting in that no active un-exploded ordnance is left. The details about exactly how this is achieved are all classified.

== Operators ==
- Greece

=== Former operators ===
- Sweden: Used on Swedish Air Force JAS 39 Gripen and AJS 37 Viggen.
