= TH-dimer =

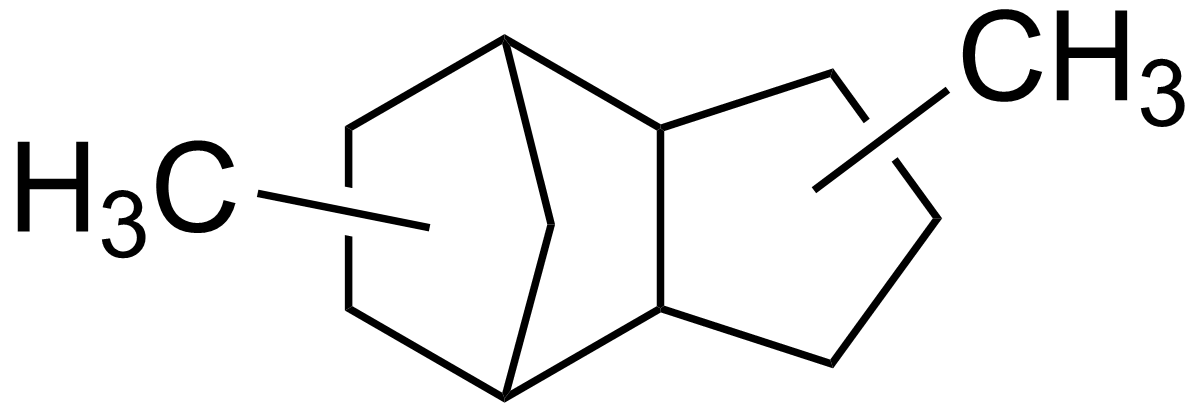

Names
- Other names Tetrahydromethylcyclopentadiene dimer; Tetrahydrodimethyldicyclopentadiene; THDMDCP; RJ-4; RJ4

Identifiers
CAS Number	30496-78-7
3D model (JSmol)	Interactive image
ChemSpider	108605
EC Number	250-218-7
PubChem CID	121721
- InChI: InChI=1S/C12H20/c1-7-8(2)12-6-11(7)9-4-3-5-10(9)12/h7-12H,3-6H2,1-2H3 Key: XGTOHMPHWPGRTK-UHFFFAOYSA-N
- SMILES: CC1C(C2CC1C3C2CCC3)C

Properties
Chemical formula	C_{12}H_{20}
Molar mass	164.292 g·mol^{−1}
Density	0.915 g/cm^{3}

Hazards
Flash point	60 °C (140 °F; 333 K)
- Except where otherwise noted, data are given for materials in their standard state (at 25 °C [77 °F], 100 kPa). verify (what is ?) Infobox references

TH-dimer, also called tetrahydromethylcyclopentadiene dimer or RJ-4, is a synthetic jet fuel used in jet engines for missiles. RJ-4 was originally developed for the ramjet engine on RIM-8 Talos naval surface-to-air missile.

The fuel is non-volatile, so it is safe to use on ships or submarines. It has a high flash point minimum of 60 °C (140 °F).

Chemically, TH-dimer is a mixture of isomeric saturated hydrocarbons derived from hydrogenation of the dimer of methylcyclopentadiene.

== Bibliography ==
- Schmidt, Eckart W. (2022a). "Tetrahydrodimethyldicyclopentadiene". Cycloaliphatic Hydrocarbons. Encyclopedia of Liquid Fuels. De Gruyter. pp. 1273–1275. doi:10.1515/9783110750287-015. ISBN 978-3-11-075028-7.
- Schmidt, Eckart W. (2022b). "Ramjet Fuel RJ-4". Ramjet Fuels. Encyclopedia of Liquid Fuels. De Gruyter. pp. 4455–4458. doi:10.1515/9783110750287-037. ISBN 978-3-11-075028-7.
