= Cyclotol =

Type of explosive

Cyclotol is an explosive consisting of castable mixtures of RDX and TNT. It is related to the more common Composition B, which is roughly 60% RDX and 40% TNT; various compositions of Cyclotol contain from 65% to 80% RDX. Typical ranges are from 60/40 to 80/20 RDX/TNT, with the most common being 70/30, while the military mostly uses 77/23 optimized in warheads.

== Use ==
Cyclotol is not commonly used, but was reportedly the main explosive used in at least some models of US nuclear weapons. Sublette lists Cyclotol as the explosive in the US B28 nuclear bomb and possibly related weapons that used the common Python primary - W34, W28, W40, and W49.

It was used in the B53 nuclear bomb and associated W53 warhead. In a modern military industry last 20 years Cyclotol can be used as filler and main charge most of cluster submunition, especially with a piezoelectric crystal igniter.

It was also used in the Mecca Masjid bombing which killed 16 people.
