= Jason Eppink =

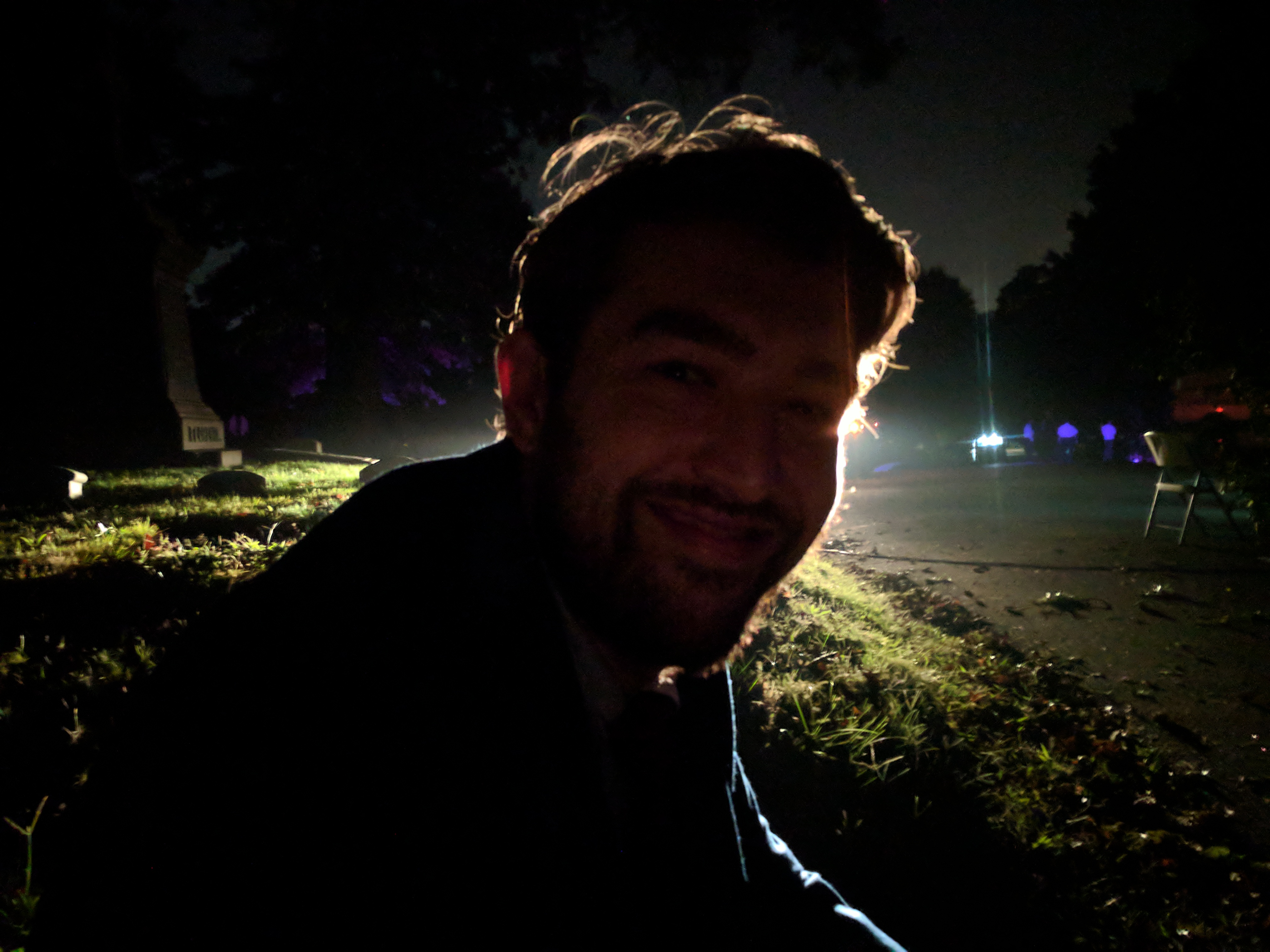
- Born: 1983 (age 42–43); Spring, Texas
- Known for: Pranks, Performance, and Participatory art

Jason Eppink (born 1983) is an American curator, designer, and prankster. His projects emphasize participation, mischief, surprise, wonder, generosity, transgression, free culture, and anti-consumerism, and they are staged in public spaces and online as street art, urban interventions, and playful online services and hoaxes, frequently for non-consenting audiences.

Eppink served as Curator of Digital Media at Museum of the Moving Image in New York City from 2006-2018. His work at the museum revolved around participation in a variety of fields, including video games, interactive art, remix, animated GIFs, and online communities. Additionally, Jason Eppink is a senior agent with prank group Improv Everywhere, a member of art collective Flux Factory, and a recurring character (40-Year-Old Goosey) on The Chris Gethard Show.

He is featured in the documentary films The World Before Your Feet (dir. Jeremy Workman, 2018) and Lily Topples the World (dir. Jeremy Workman, 2021).

== Notable design/prank projects ==
=== Pixelator ===
In 2007, Jason Eppink created a series of boxes from foam core and diffusion gel that he placed over video billboards at the entrances to New York City subway stations, turning advertisements into abstract geometric art. Eppink published a video and diagrams to encourage others to continue and improve on the project.

=== Astoria Scum River Bridge ===
In late 2009, frustrated with a sidewalk perpetually covered by residue from a leaking drainage pipe, Jason Eppink and frequent collaborator Posterchild constructed a footbridge from recycled wood and installed it at the site of the leak. The bridge and the press it attracted embarrassed authorities into fixing the decades-old problem.

=== Kickbackstarter ===
In 2011, to poke fun at the increasing popularity of crowdfunding, Jason Eppink created a parody Kickstarter campaign to raise money so he could fund his friends’ Kickstarter campaigns.

== Notable curatorial projects ==
=== We Tripped El Hadji Diouf ===
In 2012, Jason Eppink curated an installation of animated GIFs by members of Something Awful in response to a Photoshop challenge, “What tripped El Hadji Diouf?” Participants modified an animated GIF of the unpopular soccer player so he appeared to be tripped by a variety of sight gags and pop culture references. The 35 selected GIFs were displayed in a 50-foot-wide projection in the lobby of Museum of the Moving Image. In 2015, the project appeared for the first time in the United Kingdom at the National Museum of Football, as part of the exhibition Out of Play - Technology & Football.

=== Cut Up ===
In 2013, Jason Eppink curated an exhibition of short form video remixes that primarily use popular media as source material. The show examined genres and techniques that emerged online over the last ten years along with their historical precedents, proposing that remix is an increasingly common way of participating in shared cultural conversations. Exhibition sections included supercuts, recut trailers, and vidding.

=== The Reaction GIF: Moving Image as Gesture ===
In 2014, Jason Eppink engaged members of Reddit to identify frequently used reaction GIFs: animated GIFs posted in response to text in online forums and comment threads. Thirty-seven GIFs and their translations, provided by Redditors, were selected for the exhibition, which examined the increasingly popular use of the animated GIF as a form of non-verbal communication.

=== How Cats Took Over the Internet ===
In 2015, Jason Eppink curated an exhibition that addressed the phenomenon of internet cats as vernacular culture. The exhibition included a 20-year timeline of cats online; a quantified look at the popularity of cats and dogs on significant leisure websites; sociological, anthropological, and evolutionary explanations for the phenomenon; and an investigation into animals that perform similar roles on other national internets.

== Additional references ==
- "The GOOD 100". GOOD Magazine. 2009-10-11.
- Driever, Juliana (2013-05-29). "The Big Picture: Jason Eppink". Bad At Sports.
