= Secret Mall Apartment =

2024 documentary film

- Theatrical release poster
- Directed by: Jeremy Workman
- Produced by: Jeremy Workman; Jesse Eisenberg
- Starring: Michael Townsend; Colin Bliss; Adriana Valdez-Young; Andrew Oesch; Greta Scheing; James Mercer; Emily Ustach; Jay Zehngebot
- Cinematography: Dan Kennedy; Michael Lisnet; Jeremy Workman
- Edited by: Paul Murphy; Jeremy Workman
- Music by: Claire Manchon; Olivier Manchon
- Production company: Wheelhouse Creative
- Release date: March 8, 2024 (SXSW)
- Running time: 92 minutes
- Country: United States
- Language: English
- Box office: $850,593

Secret Mall Apartment is a 2024 American documentary film directed by filmmaker Jeremy Workman that recounts the story of a group of young Rhode Islanders who built a secret apartment inside the Providence Place shopping mall in Providence in 2003, living there for four years until getting caught and charged with trespassing in 2007. The documentary was a moderate box office success, including an extended run at the theater in the mall that housed the apartment in question. It achieved greater success on Netflix, where by January 2026, it had become one of the top five more viewed programs on that platform.

The group filmed much of their activity in the secret apartment with inexpensive Pentax Optio cameras that they purchased at the mall's RadioShack. The story of the secret apartment had been urban legend for many years, and the documentary brought together the original eight participants for the first time in 17 years.

Secret Mall Apartment marks the second collaboration between Workman and actor Jesse Eisenberg, who serves as one of the film's producers, following their collaboration on the 2018 documentary The World Before Your Feet.

== Synopsis ==
The film tells the true story of eight Rhode Islanders who built and lived in a secret room inside a local mall from 2003 to 2007.

== Background ==
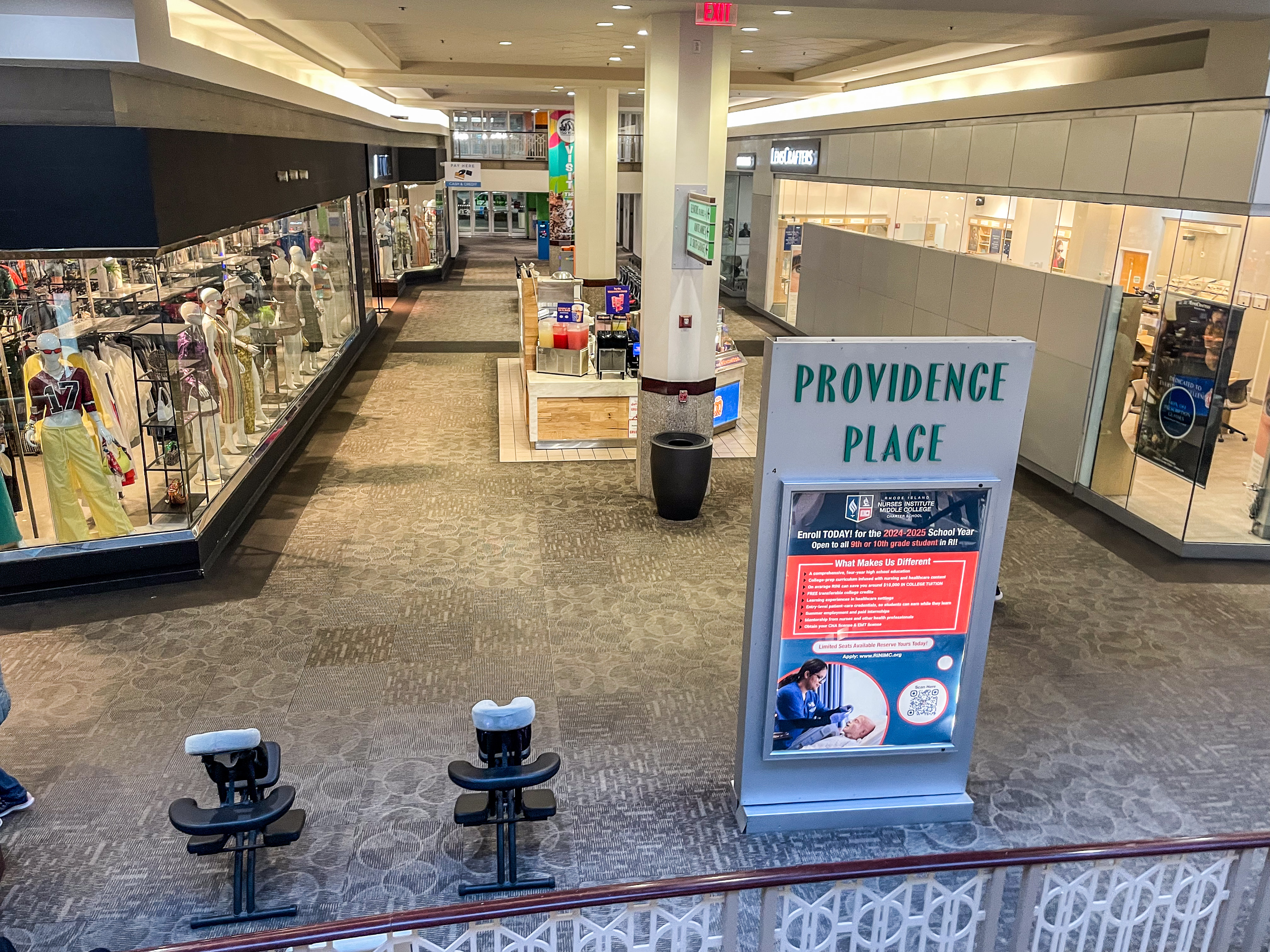
A hidden space in Providence Place Mall was the location of the secret apartment.

According to main subject Michael Townsend, after the story broke in 2007, several Hollywood production companies approached him about making a film. For nearly 15 years, he and his fellow artists turned down "north of 30 directors" who wanted to make a documentary on the story. Finally, in 2019, after meeting director Jeremy Workman in Greece while he was filming Lily Topples the World, Townsend felt like he had finally found a director who could tell the story properly, which involved depicting how the group's outside public artwork intersected with the larger ideas of the secret apartment.

The film follows an unusual story arc, in which the story starts with a playful premise but develops and unfolds in unusual and surprising ways. In an interview with The Washington Post, Workman describes the shape-shifting quality of the film, stating “What was so neat about the secret apartment was this shape-shifting aspect,” Workman continued. “It starts as one thing and transforms into another. They’re doing it as a protest [against] gentrification. No, it’s a prank. No, you know, it’s artwork." Additionally, Workman has talked about seeing the secret apartment as "the Trojan Horse" to explore deeper ideas about passion and purpose. He has also spoken about how the film itself acts as a bit of misdirection, in which audiences are drawn to the film's topic in a superficial way, but then are directed away from it towards a more meaningful story.

== Release ==
Secret Mall Apartment had its world premiere at the SXSW Film Festival on March 8, 2024, where its popularity earned it the festival's first added "Buzz Screening". It was cited in several high-profile publications as one of the stand-out documentaries of SXSW and subsequently as one of "the best documentaries of 2024."

After premiering at the 2024 SXSW Film Festival, the documentary later screened at the Hot Docs Canadian International Documentary Festival, Melbourne International Film Festival, Vancouver International Film Festival, Hamptons International Film Festival, and the closing night film of the newportFilm Outdoor Festival, winning a number of film festival awards during its run.

Despite receiving interest from numerous film distributors for Secret Mall Apartment, Workman decided to self-release the film. The film was released theatrically in the United States beginning March 21, 2025, including at the Cineplex of the Providence Place, the very mall where the story took place. Secret Mall Apartment went on screen at over 220 theaters in over 150 cities and became one of 2025's biggest documentary box office hits.

The film was then acquired by Netflix and made available on the site in the US in January 2026. It entered Netflix's "Top 10" on its first day on the streaming site, and then was the fourth most-watched film on Netflix during the week of 01-26-26, having been watched nearly 3 million times in the United States during that week.

== Critical response ==
Secret Mall Apartment has been widely praised upon its release. On the review aggregator website Rotten Tomatoes, 98% of 54 critics' reviews are positive. The website's consensus reads: "Secret Mall Apartment unspools a wild story full of relatable wish fulfillment and social commentary, making for a highly entertaining treatise on artistic expression." Metacritic, which uses a weighted average, assigned the film a score of 82 out of 100, based on nine critics, indicating "universal acclaim".

Michael Phillips of Chicago Tribune stated that the film is “Delightful and moving... Issues of urban renewal, the value of public art, the difficulty of being married to an obsessive artist and lots more run through Workman’s film. It’s consistently, thoughtfully engaging. And, yes, often very funny in its open-hearted embrace of the DIY spirit, legal or otherwise.” Bilge Ebiri of Vulture said the film was “Deliriously entertaining and moving... Watching Secret Mall Apartment, I was reminded at times of Man on Wire.” Vulture went on to call the film "one of the best of 2025."

Alyssa Wilkinson of The New York Times wrote that "Jeremy Workman’s documentary looks back at a project that may sound like a joke but had serious underpinnings" and asked "Can an apartment be art? Yes, the movie suggests — if you understand art to be fused with life, a way of existing rather than just something you make and sell."

Brian Farvour of The Playlist stated that "art and rebellion collide in this unique time capsule." Coleman Spilde of The Daily Beast stated that "director Jeremy Workman sews together a larger narrative that, at times, becomes unexpectedly moving." Brian Tallerico of RogerEbert.com stated that "the Secret Mall Apartment led to the kind of environment where creatives inspire other creatives to be their best selves". Alex Hudson of Exclaim! stated that "Secret Mall Apartment turns a childlike fantasy into a commentary on capitalism." Michael Nordine of Variety gave the film a mixed positive review, writing that the film "is a thoughtful celebration of the DIY artistry behind that experiment, but only a so-so investigation of it."

Despite its only playing at film festivals in 2024, critic Peter Keough called the film one of the best documentaries of the year, stating in The Arts Fuse that "the secret apartment also symbolized a Borgesian kind of subversiveness, a meta-mirror of the culture that the artists inhabited and subverted." Vogue also included the film as one of the best documentaries of 2024, stating that "the film is both an elaborate archaeological excavation and a creative re-enchantment of urban corporate space."

For Point of View, Susan G. Cole wrote, "If this was act of resistance, wouldn’t it have been useful for the forces you’re fighting to know what you were doing? Who benefits, actually? And if nobody can see this clever installation, is it art? Like any fascinating meditation on the meaning of art and its potential as a political force, Workman’s doc asks more questions than it answers, which is a very good thing."

== Awards ==
- Cleveland International Film Festival, Grand Jury "Standing Up" Documentary Award
- IFFBoston, Audience Award Best Documentary
- IFFBoston, Grand Jury Prize Best Documentary
- deadCenter Film Festival, Audience Award Best Feature
- Sidewalk Film Festival, Audience Choice Award Best Documentary
- Calgary International Film Festival, Special Jury Prize for Artistic Subversion
- newportFilm, Audience Award Best Documentary

== See also ==
- Roofman
