= Kelly Marie Tran =

American actress (born 1989)

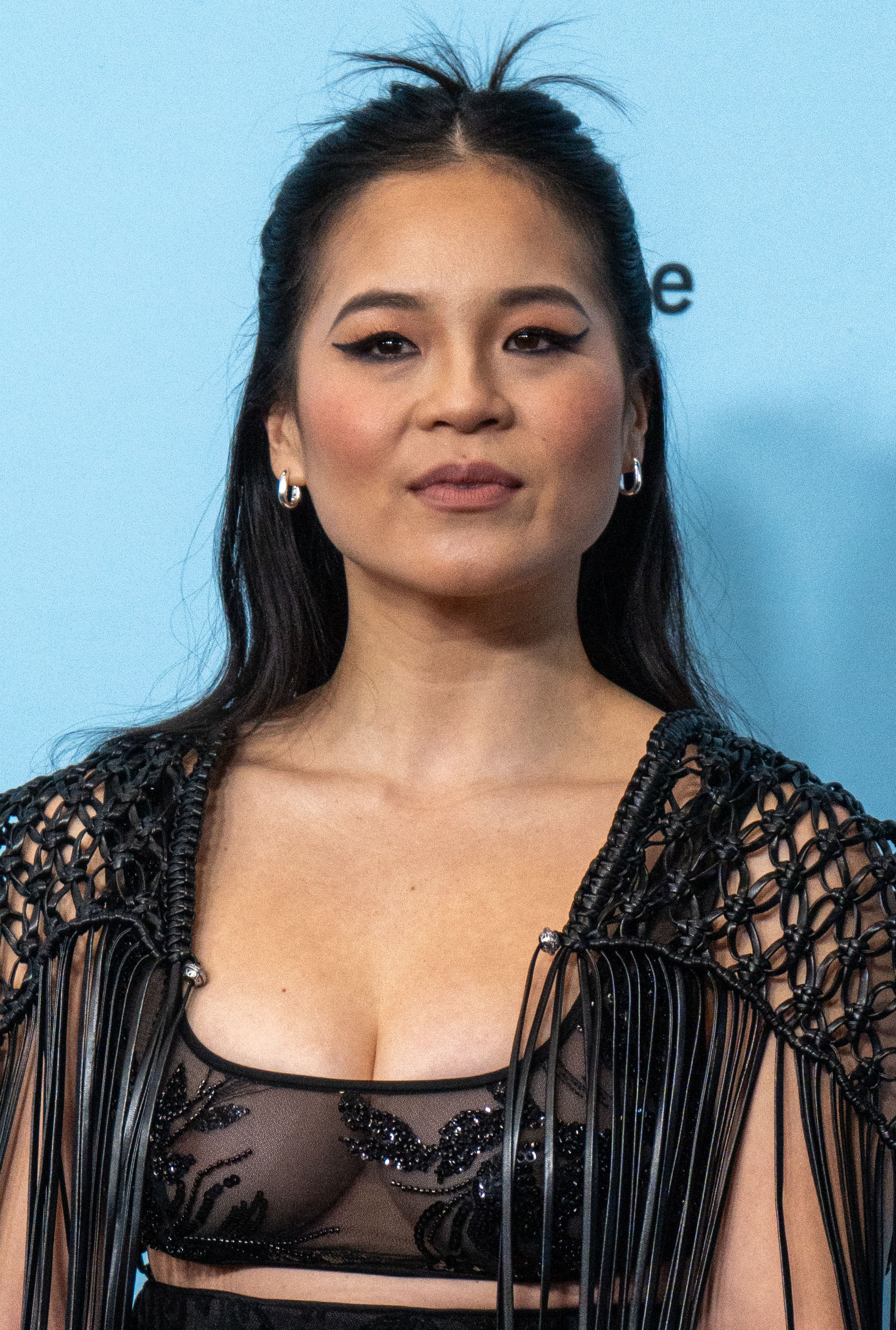
- Tran in 2025
- Born: Loan Tran; January 17, 1989 (age 37); San Diego, California, U.S.
- Education: University of California, Los Angeles (BA)
- Occupations: Actress; voice actress
- Years active: 2011–present

Kelly Marie Tran (born Loan Tran, January 17, 1989) is an American actress and voice actress. She began acting in 2011, with most of her roles being in short film and television. She came to global prominence for her role as Rose Tico in the Star Wars sequel trilogy films The Last Jedi (2017) and The Rise of Skywalker (2019). She also voiced Raya in the Disney film Raya and the Last Dragon (2021) and Dawn Betterman in the DreamWorks Animation film The Croods: A New Age (2020).

== Early life ==
Tran was born on January 17, 1989, in San Diego, California. Her parents were refugees from Vietnam who fled the country following the Vietnam War. As a child, her father, Tony Tran, was homeless and grew up on the streets of Vietnam; he then worked at Burger King after moving to the United States to support the family. Her mother, Kay Nguyen, worked at a funeral home.

Tran attended Westview High School in San Diego and worked at a yogurt shop to earn money for head shots. Tran then graduated from the University of California, Los Angeles with a Bachelor of Arts in communications.

== Career ==
=== 2011–2014: Early work ===
Tran's early credits consisted of primarily CollegeHumor videos and small TV roles. She landed a commercial agent in 2011, who got Tran to take improv classes at the Upright Citizens Brigade. At the Second City, Tran is part of the all-female Asian-American improv group Number One Son.

In 2013, she starred in the web series Ladies Like Us. In 2015, Tran was working as an assistant at a creative recruiting firm in Century City.

=== 2015–2019: Star Wars and mainstream success ===
In 2015, Tran was cast as Rose Tico in Star Wars: The Last Jedi. Rose Tico is a rebel mechanic who joins up with main character Finn after the sacrifice of her oldest sister, Paige Tico (Veronica Ngo), a gunner trained by Resistance commander Poe Dameron. When she went to shoot her scenes in England in early 2016, she was required to keep her role secret, so she told her family she was making an independent film in Canada. The Last Jedi made Tran the first Asian-American woman to have a major role in a Star Wars film. In 2017, she also became the first woman of Asian descent to appear on the cover of Vanity Fair when she appeared on the cover of the summer 2017 issue with actor John Boyega (who played Finn) and Oscar Isaac (who played X-wing fighter pilot Poe Dameron).

After the release of Star Wars: The Last Jedi in December 2017, Tran became the subject of racist and sexist attacks over the Internet and on Twitter, including insults about her ethnicity and size. Her character Rose Tico's entry on Wookieepedia, an online encyclopedia about the Star Wars universe, was edited by internet trolls to include racist and vulgar comments; Fandom, the wiki hosting service that operated the domain, removed the offensive edits, protected the page, and publicly condemned the vandalism. After months of online harassment, Tran deleted all of her Instagram posts in June 2018, and replaced the account bio with, "Afraid, but doing it anyway." She also pursued therapy following the harassment. Subsequently, several cast and crew members of The Last Jedi condemned the attacks and spoke out in defense of Tran, including writer-director Rian Johnson and actors John Boyega, Domhnall Gleeson, and Mark Hamill. Other celebrities voiced support for Tran as well, including Stephen Colbert, Josh Gad, Kumail Nanjiani, Gabrielle Union, Elijah Wood, and Edgar Wright. In less than one day, more than 20,000 fans retweeted a message of support for Tran from a fan on Twitter that sought to "drown out the manbabies." She was also shown support at the 2018 San Diego Comic-Con during a "Rally for Rose," where fans appeared in cosplay attire as her Star Wars character Rose Tico, wore "Rose for Hope" T-shirts, and used the social media hashtags #ForceOutHate and #RallyForRose. At Star Wars Celebration in April 2019, Tran received a standing ovation from fans, causing her to tear up at the reception.

In August 2018, Tran wrote an essay on the subject for The New York Times entitled "Kelly Marie Tran: I Won't Be Marginalized by Online Harassment." She wrote that the attacks had reinforced the ones she had long faced as a Vietnamese-American, and that the ordeal reached a point where she began to believe the negative remarks about her, stating that they had sent her "down a spiral of self-hate, into the darkest recesses of my mind, places where I tore myself apart, where I put their words above my own self-worth." She concluded with, "You might know me as Kelly. I am the first woman of color to have a leading role in a Star Wars movie. I am the first Asian woman to appear on the cover of Vanity Fair. My real name is Loan. And I am just getting started." Tran later said the essay was difficult to write, but also "probably one of the proudest moments of [her] career thus far."

Tran plays the lead role of Kaitlin Le in Radiotopia's mystery thriller podcast Passenger List. She was a series regular on the Facebook Watch series Sorry for Your Loss.

=== 2020–present ===
Tran in 2026

Tran voiced Raya in the Walt Disney Animation Studios production Raya and the Last Dragon, replacing Cassie Steele. Tran was set to voice Val Little in the Disney+ series Monsters at Work, but was replaced by Mindy Kaling. She has also been cast as Dawn in the film The Croods: A New Age, replacing Kat Dennings.

Tran is an executive producer on Jeremy Workman's 2021 documentary Lily Topples the World, which follows 21-year-old domino toppling artist Lily Hevesh. The documentary premiered to critical acclaim at the 2021 South by Southwest Film Festival, where it won the Grand Jury Prize for Best Documentary.

Tran is also an executive producer of the spoken-word poetry ensemble film Summertime, marking her second collaboration with Raya and the Last Dragon director Carlos López Estrada. Tran and Estrada announced that they were establishing a new production company called Antigravity Academy in November 2022, intending to help produce entertainment from and about people from historically excluded communities. In 2023, Tran starred in two films that premiered at film festivals: Tayarisha Poe's second feature film The Young Wife, alongside Kiersey Clemons, and Me, Myself & The Void.

Tran starred in Rock Springs, for writer-director Vera Miao. She is also currently developing a biopic about civil rights activist and her close friend Amanda Nguyen.

In 2026, Tran starred in Saigon, an eight-part scripted audio drama for iHeartPodcasts, produced by Thoroughbred Studios and Goldhawk Productions and directed by John Scott Dryden. The series is based on the 1982 bestselling novel Saigon by British author Anthony Grey, and was recorded on location in Ho Chi Minh City. Tran, whose parents were Vietnamese refugees, said the story drew her in because of its themes of family separation and endurance across generations: "My parents came to the United States as refugees from Vietnam and were separated from their own parents for more than two decades. That experience is what drew me to Saigon." The series premiered on April 22, 2026, with new episodes released weekly on Wednesdays. In October 2026, Tran began performances as "Lauren" in Lauren Yee's King of the Yees at the Signature Theatre Company. The run of the play was extended through November 22, 2026.

== Personal life ==
In November 2024, Tran came out publicly as queer in an interview with Vanity Fair stating "I haven't said this publicly yet, but I'm a queer person," while discussing her role in the 2025 remake of queer rom-com The Wedding Banquet directed by Andrew Ahn.

== Filmography ==
Key
†	Denotes projects that have not yet released

=== Film ===
Year	Title	Role	Notes
2012	The Cohasset Snuff Film	Christine Chan	Film debut
2016	XOXO	Butterfly Rave Girl	
2017	Star Wars: The Last Jedi	Rose Tico	
2019	Star Wars: The Rise of Skywalker	Rose Tico	
2020	The Croods: A New Age	Dawn Betterman	Voice role
2021	Raya and the Last Dragon	Raya	Voice role
2023	The Young Wife	Tessa	
2023	Once Upon a Studio	Raya	Short film; voice role
2023	Me, Myself & The Void	Mia	
2025	The Wedding Banquet	Angela Chen	
2025	Forge	Emily Lee	
2025	Control Freak	Valerie Nguyen	
2026	Rock Springs	Emily	
TBA	Kodak SuperXX †	Linh	Post-production
TBA	Quads & The Kicker †	Li'l Jo	Post-production

=== Television ===
Year	Title	Role	Notes
2014	CollegeHumor	Full Asian / Kate / Kelly / Startup "Foodler" Girl / Melissa / Amber	Web series
2014	Gortimer Gibbon's Life on Normal Street	Sara	3 episodes
2014	About a Boy	Marguerite	2 episodes
2015	Comedy Bang! Bang!	Teen Friend	Episode: "Thomas Middleditch Wears an Enigmatic Sweatshirt and Sweatpants with Pockets"
2015	Adam Ruins Everything	Sharon / Phone Woman	2 episodes
2016	Sing It!	Twinkle Twinkle Auditioner	Episode: "THE SHOW BEGINS!"
2018	Star Wars Forces of Destiny	Rose Tico	Voice role; Episode: "Shuttle Shock"
2018	Lego Star Wars: All-Stars	Rose Tico	Voice role; 2 episodes
2018	Sorry for Your Loss	Jules Shaw	18 episodes
2020	Monsterland	Lauren	Episode: "Iron River, Michigan"
2020	The Lego Star Wars Holiday Special	Rose Tico	Voice role; television special
2021	The Croods: Family Tree	Dawn Betterman	Voice role; 25 episodes
2022	Lego Star Wars: Summer Vacation	Rose Tico	Voice role; television special
2024	Sweet Tooth	Rosie Zhang	8 episodes (season 3)
2024	Lego Star Wars: Rebuild the Galaxy	Darth Rose	Voice role; 2 episodes

=== Video Games ===
Year	Title	Role
TBA	Disney Dreamlight Valley	Raya
TBA	Disney Speedstorm	Raya

== Awards and nominations ==
Year	Award	Category	Nominated work	Result
2018	23rd Empire Awards	Best Female Newcomer	Star Wars: The Last Jedi	Nominated
2018	44th Saturn Awards	Best Supporting Actress	Star Wars: The Last Jedi	Nominated
2018	20th Teen Choice Awards	Choice Breakout Movie Star	Star Wars: The Last Jedi	Nominated
2022	49th Annie Awards	Best Voice Acting – Feature	Raya and the Last Dragon	Nominated
