= Eppink =

Eppink is a surname. Notable people with the surname include:

- Derk Jan Eppink (born 1958), Dutch politician
- Jason Eppink (born 1983), American artist
