= Magical Universe =

- Directed by: Jeremy Workman
- Produced by: Jeremy Workman; Robert J. Lyons
- Starring: Al Carbee
- Cinematography: Jeremy Workman; John Atherton Monroe; James G. Colston; Michael Lisnet
- Edited by: Jeremy Workman
- Music by: Karen Altman
- Distributed by: IFC Films
- Release dates: April 16, 2013 (Athens); October 31, 2014
- Running time: 77 minutes
- Country: United States
- Language: English

Magical Universe is a 2013 documentary film directed by filmmaker Jeremy Workman about reclusive outsider artist Al Carbee who created elaborate dioramas and collages featuring Barbie dolls. The title of the film is taken from Carbee's own voluminous writings about his art.

The film grew out of Workman's short film Carbee's Barbies and encompasses the final years of Carbee's life, a period in which Workman became Carbee's closest friend and his only link to the outside world.

First presented at numerous film festivals, Magical Universe was acquired by IFC Films and released theatrically on October 31, 2014.

== Synopsis ==
Al Carbee is an American original, in which an 88-year-old recluse living in Maine devotes nearly all his time to creating elaborate works of art from Barbie dolls. This documentary, filmed over the course of the director's decade-long friendship with the artist, goes inside the mind of Carbee to reveal his rich, and sometimes heart-wrenching inner-life. A portrait of an all but unknown artist and a testament to the triumph of the creative spirit, Magical Universe is a tribute to a visionary.

== Release ==
After winning several film festival awards, Magical Universe was acquired by theatrical distributors IFC Films and was released in theaters on October 31, 2014. It was subsequently made available on Netflix in May 2015 as well as on the IFC Films Unlimited streaming platform on Amazon Prime.

In the summer of 2016, Magical Universe was featured at the Musée des Arts Décoratifs, Paris at the Louvre as part of their Barbie exhibit.

In 2026, Vinegar Syndrome and IFC Films released a Special Edition BluRay, featuring interviews with artist/animator Peter Burr and several film personalities.

== Critical response ==
On review aggregator Rotten Tomatoes, the film holds an approval rating of 71% based on 8 reviews, with an average rating of 6.12/10. In the Los Angeles Times, Michael Rechtshaffen described the film as "whimsical... affectionate...A tender portrait of the artist as a weirdly gifted, wildly prolific, and strange man" and made the film a Los Angeles Times Critics Choice. Lauren Wissot of Filmmaker magazine suggested that the film is "crafted in a style that brings us practically inside the brain of the 88-year old outsider artist." And during the film's national theatrical run, the Village Voice made it a Critics Pick with film critic Abby Garnett saying that Workman "captures the poignancy of Carbee's drive to create ideal images...This story is about tenderness and empathy."

== Awards ==
- Woodstock Film Festival, Best Documentary Audience Award (winner)
- Woodstock Film Festival, Best Documentary Jury Award (Honorable Mention)
- Salem Film Festival, Audience Award (winner)
- Las Vegas Film Festival, Special Jury Prize (winner)
