= Deciding Vote =

- Directed by: Jeremy Workman; Robert J. Lyons
- Produced by: Jeremy Workman; Robert J. Lyons; Doron Steger; Sherry Steger
- Cinematography: Gabriella Garcia-Pardo; Karen Rodriguez; Lynn Weissman; Michael Lisnet
- Edited by: Kristin Bye
- Music by: Olivier and Clare Manchon
- Production company: Wheelhouse Creative
- Distributed by: The New Yorker
- Release date: November 29, 2023
- Running time: 20 minutes
- Country: United States
- Language: English

Deciding Vote is a 2023 American short documentary film about Assemblyman George M. Michaels and his tie-breaking vote on the 1970 New York abortion bill. It was directed by Jeremy Workman and Robert J. Lyons.

First presented at numerous film festivals, Deciding Vote was released by The New Yorker on November 29, 2023. It was Oscar Shortlisted for Best Short Documentary and then subsequently nominated for Most Outstanding Short Documentary at the 45th News and Documentary Emmy Awards.

== Synopsis ==
More than 50 years ago, Assemblyman George M. Michaels cast a single vote on New York's abortion bill that changed the course of American history but destroyed his political career in the process. Representing a conservative Catholic district, he had switched his vote at the last minute, thus ensuring the passage of abortion rights in the state, leading to other developments nationwide including the 1973 Roe v. Wade decision by the United States Supreme Court.

== Reception ==
The film won several film festival awards and received positive reviews.

Film critic Christopher Reed of Film Festival Today stated "In their powerful 20-minute documentary, directors Robert J. Lyons and Jeremy Workman offer an inspiring profile of a man unafraid to confront blowback.". Critic Jennie Kermode of Eye For Film called it "a vital piece of filmmaking."

Film critic Richard Propes of The Independent Critic stated that "the film rather magnificently captures the relatively unsung story of George Michaels, a former New York Assemblyman who in 1970 represented a conservative Catholic district during a time when the pro-choice/abortion rights movement was growing."
