= George M. Michaels =

American politician

George Meyer Michaels

New York Assemblyman from Cayuga County
- In office 1961–1965
- Preceded by: Charles A. Cusick
- Succeeded by: District abolished

New York Assemblyman from the 137th District
- In office 1966
- Preceded by: District created
- Succeeded by: V. Sumner Carroll

New York Assemblyman from the 122nd District
- In office 1969–1970
- Preceded by: Louis H. Folmer
- Succeeded by: Lloyd Stephen Riford, Jr.

Personal details
- Born: September 15, 1910
- Died: December 3, 1992 (aged 82)
- Party: Democratic
- Spouse: Helen Wetzler
- Children: Three sons
- Education: Cornell University; Brooklyn Law School

George M. Michaels (September 15, 1910 – December 3, 1992) was an American Democratic Party politician from New York, who served in the New York State Assembly from 1961 to 1966 and 1969 to 1970, where he was best known for his changed vote that played a pivotal role in the passage of an expanded abortion rights law in New York State.

Michaels is the subject of the award-winning short documentary Deciding Vote, which premiered on The New Yorker.

== Biography ==
=== Early life ===
Michaels was born on September 15, 1910 (as per the Social Security Death Index) in College Point, Queens, New York City. He attended Cornell University, and graduated from Brooklyn Law School. Then he practiced law in Auburn, Cayuga County, New York. He served in the United States Marine Corps during World War II, enlisting as a private and leaving as a captain.

He was a member of the New York State Assembly from 1961 to 1966, sitting in the 173rd, 174th, 175th and 176th New York State Legislatures. In 1966, the new apportionment joined Cayuga and Cortland counties into the 122nd District, and Michaels declined to run for re-election. Michaels was again a member of the State Assembly in 1969 and 1970. In the Assembly he was an advocate for expanded state aid to rural school districts and in sentencing and prison issues. He was the sponsor of the 1970 bill that made the bluebird the official state bird of New York.

=== New York's abortion law ===
Michaels supported what he saw as a woman's right to choose to have an abortion on a personal basis. At the request of the Cayuga County Democratic Committee he had voted twice against efforts to loosen restrictions, including an early April 1970 effort that was narrowly defeated.

Franz Leichter, a Democratic Assemblyman from Manhattan drafted a bill expanding abortion rights together with Republican Assemblywoman Constance Cook of upstate Tompkins County, New York, proposing legislation that included no restrictions on the practice of abortion. The bill passed in the Senate on March 18, 1970, after five hours of debate by a vote of 31–26. For the Assembly, the bill was amended to allow for women to have abortions until their 24th week of pregnancy or at any time to protect the life of the mother. As the roll call progressed in the Assembly on April 9, 1970, the legislature deadlocked at 74 in favor and 74 opposed, with the Assembly speaker not voting in a case when it did not make a difference, leaving the count two short of the absolute majority of 76 members of the 150-member Assembly needed to pass the bill.

Michaels had earlier voted against the proposal during the roll call, but rose to speak before the Clerk of the Assembly could close the vote and bring it to defeat. Those assembled in the galleries were unsure of his purpose, but he alluded to his intentions when he said that his constituents were going to "condemn me for what I am about to do". He continued with his speech, stating "I realize, Mr. Speaker, that I am terminating my political career, but I cannot in good conscience sit here and allow my vote to be the one that defeats this bill ... [and asked] that my vote be changed from "no" to "yes"". His prediction regarding his political future turned out to be accurate. In explaining his change of heart, Michaels stated that "One of my sons just called me a whore for the vote I cast against this" and that another son had insisted: "Dad, for God's sake, don't let your vote be the vote that defeats this bill." After his changed vote, the chamber erupted in bedlam, Michaels buried his face in his hands, and one person shouted epithets at him.

With the switch by Michaels, the vote stood 75 to 73, and the Speaker was called to vote, this being a case when the speaker's vote would directly influence the result. Speaker Perry Duryea voted also for the law, and it passed by a vote of 76 to 73 in the Assembly. Governor Nelson Rockefeller signed the law the next day and the U.S. Supreme Court patterned its ruling in its landmark January 1973 decision Roe v. Wade on the New York law.

Michaels ran for a sixth term of office in 1970. The district consisted of two counties, Cortland and Cayuga (Auburn). Cortland's population in the 1970 census was 46,000, Cayuga had 77,000.

The Cortland County Democratic Committee met first and endorsed Michaels in a vote that was overwhelming but not unanimous, with two members voting "no." The Cayuga County Democratic Committee met next endorsed John Rossi by a vote of 72 to 53. The issue was his vote on the abortion law. On June 23, he ran in the Democratic primary and was defeated, joining D. Clinton Dominick III, a Republican who had sponsored the bill in the state senate who also lost in the primary, apparently due to his support for the abortion bill. Michaels ran in a four-way race in the November election on the Liberal ticket for re-election, but was defeated by Republican Lloyd Stephen Riford Jr.

Michaels died on December 3, 1992, at his home in Auburn, New York, after a long illness. He was survived by his wife of 59 years, the former Helen Wetzler, three sons and eight grandchildren.

== Deciding Vote ==
Michaels's dramatic vote on the 1970 New York abortion bill is the subject of the short documentary Deciding Vote (2023) which was released by The New Yorker in November 2023. The documentary was directed by Jeremy Workman and Robert J. Lyons and won numerous film festival awards and citations, before being Oscar-shortlisted in 2024. Deciding Vote was nominated for Most Outstanding Short Film for the 45th News and Documentary Emmy Awards.

== See also ==
- Deciding Vote (2023)

New York State Assembly
Preceded by Charles A. Cusick	New York State Assembly; Cayuga County; 1961–1965	Succeeded by district abolished
Preceded by new district	New York State Assembly; 137th District; 1966	Succeeded by V. Sumner Carroll
Preceded by Louis H. Folmer	New York State Assembly; 122nd District; 1969–1970	Succeeded by Lloyd Stephen Riford, Jr.
