= Who Is Henry Jaglom? =

- Directed by: Henry-Alex Rubin; Jeremy Workman
- Starring: Henry Jaglom; Orson Welles; Peter Bogdanovich; Miloš Forman; Candice Bergen; Dennis Hopper; Karen Black; Louis Malle; Bob Rafelson; Andrea Marcovicci; Martha Plimpton
- Release date: 1995
- Running time: 52 minutes
- Country: United States
- Language: English

Who Is Henry Jaglom? is a feature-length documentary on filmmaker Henry Jaglom directed by Henry-Alex Rubin and Jeremy Workman. First presented at numerous film festivals in 1995, the documentary premiered on PBS's documentary series POV in 1997.

== Overview ==
The documentary covers the life and works of film director Henry Jaglom and features interviews with many filmmakers and actors from the New Hollywood, including Peter Bogdanovich, Dennis Hopper, Bob Rafelson, Karen Black, Seymour Cassel and Sally Kellerman, as well as several international directors including Miloš Forman and Louis Malle.

The film includes rare footage of Orson Welles on the set of Jaglom's film Someone to Love (1987 film), and features snippets of the original audio recordings that Jaglom made while lunching with Welles, which formed the basis of his book My Lunches With Orson.

The documentary features Behind-the-scenes footage on the set of Jaglom's 1995 ensemble Last Summer in the Hamptons, in which the two documentary directors have small roles playing film students.

Who Is Henry Jaglom? is unique in giving voice to many critics and dissenters of Jaglom's work, including from critic and actors who have worked with him.

== Reception ==
On Rotten Tomatoes, the film has an approval rating of 86% based on 7 reviews. and the documentary has been often praised for its punchy style and unique take.

Mike D'Angelo of Entertainment Weekly gave the film a B+. Kevin Thomas of Los Angeles Times wrote that the film does "a terrific job of capturing Jaglom and his bustling world." Stuart Galbraith IV of DVD Talk praised its humor, wide selection of material, and insight into Jaglom's life and artistry. Critic Jonathan Kiefer of Sacramento News & Review called the documentary "a jaunty portrait shows the man as, at least for starters, a flirt, a bully, a friend to Orson Welles... a necessary moviemaking gadfly, impressively committed to his artistic ideals."

Others including Emmanuel Levy of Variety found the film superficial and wrote that it "leaves so many important areas unexplored that the director’s admirers and his detractors are likely to be dissatisfied and frustrated by the experience." Jesse MacLean of PopMatters wrote that the directors "strain to present a complex portrait but end up with a sketch less detailed than the one on the DVD sleeve."
