= Domino toppling =

Chain reaction involving standing domino tiles

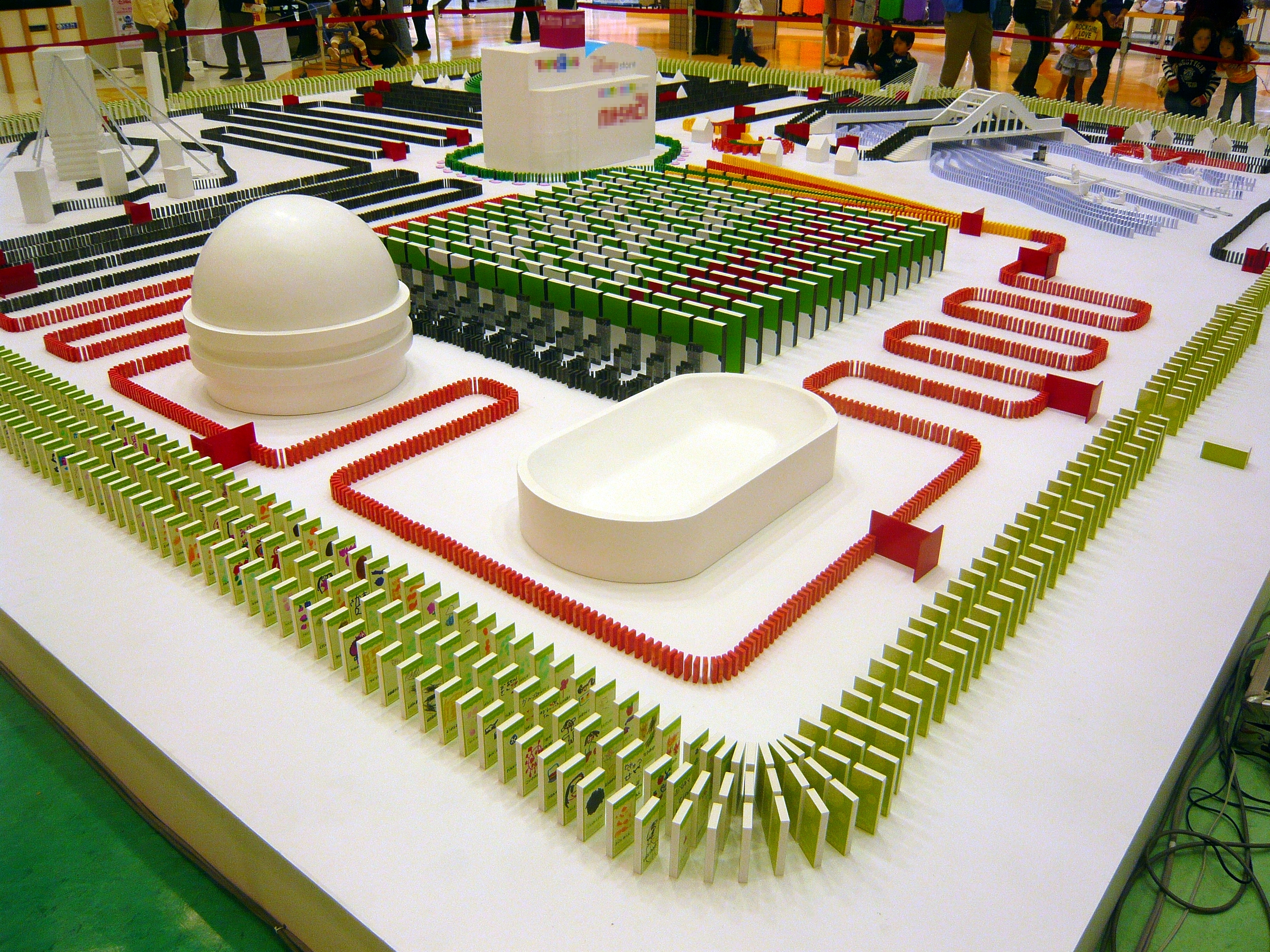
A domino show

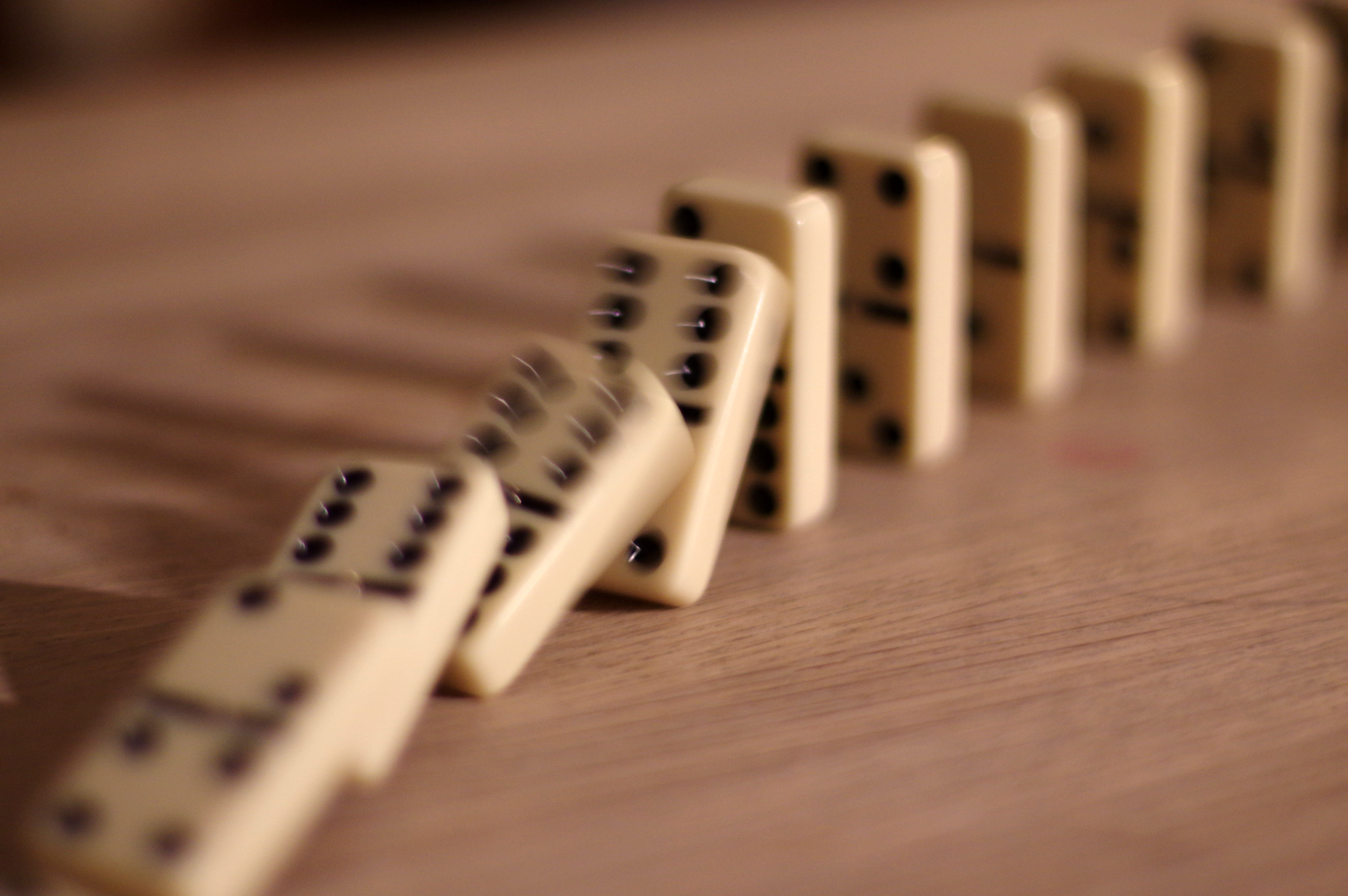
Dominoes in motion

Domino toppling refers to the process of arranging dominoes in a sequential layout, commonly known as a domino run, and subsequently knocking over the first domino in the sequence. This action triggers a chain reaction, where each domino in turn falls into the next, resulting in a cascading effect termed the domino effect.

Competitions in which two or more players aim to be the first to knock down all their arranged dominoes may be referred to as a domino rally. When domino toppling is performed for an audience, it is typically called a domino show.

== Description ==
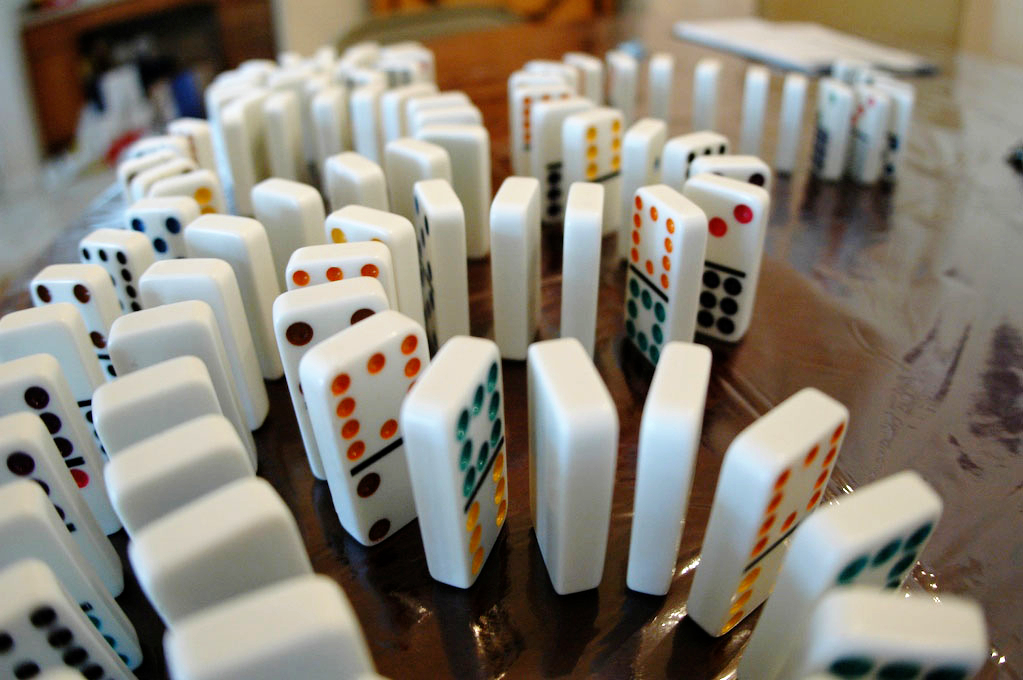
Dominoes waiting to fall

Domino toppling involves the arrangement of dominoes in a standing position to create patterns and sequences, known as a domino run. Builders can utilize dominoes of various colors to generate designs and images, with some dominoes exhibiting different colors on their front and back surfaces. This allows for a visual contrast before and after the dominoes are toppled.

Techniques employed in domino toppling may include three-dimensional structures, spiral formations, letter shapes, and the integration of Rube Goldberg machines. Most often, only the first domino is manually knocked over to initiate the sequence, with subsequent dominoes advised to fall in succession through the chain reaction. Large-scale arrangements can consist of millions of dominoes, designed to take several minutes or even hours to complete their fall.

To manage the risk of premature toppling, builders may incorporate special blockages, known as firebreaks, at regular intervals within the arrangement. These firebreaks serve to contain the collapse to specific sections, allowing for the removal of blocks without damaging surrounding tiles.

Pressman Toys previously produced a product called Domino Rally, which included tiles and mechanical devices designed for creating domino toppling displays.

== History ==
The first public domino shows were organized by Bob Speca, Jr. from Broomall, Pennsylvania, in the United States. In 1976, at the age of 18, he established the first official world record for the most dominoes toppled in a chain reaction, by setting up and toppling down 11,111 pieces. That event, and his appearance on The Tonight Show triggered a domino-toppling craze, leading to a long lasting competition among domino-builders about the world record. In 1984, Klaus Friedrich from Germany was the last person to set up a new domino-toppling world record single-handedly. In that same year, student filmmakers Sheri Herman and Bonnie Cutler from Temple University produced and directed the film And They All Fall Down, showcasing Speca's talents. The film is part of the permanent collection of the Berlin Film Museum.

On June 9, 1979, British engineer Michael Cairney set a Guinness World Record by toppling 169,573 dominoes in Poughkeepsie, New York, during the World Domino Spectacular, which benefited the National Hemophilia Association. After fifteen days of set-up, The World Domino Spectacular launched with over 30 domino stunts. Cairney and his all volunteer team cheered as the 22,000 square foot progressive topple crossed mini bridges, triggered a rocket, toppled spirals, knocked over a twenty foot domino peacock design and made the first domino-enabled international phone call to confirm the world record. Stunt engineer Bruce Duffy designed the World Domino Spectacular Stunt #22 which consisted of 53 flags representing the members of the World Federation of Hemophilia.

Since 1986, the Netherlands has hosted an annual domino-toppling exhibition known as Domino Day. On November 18, 2005, a team from Weijers Domino Productions knocked over 4 million dominoes at this event. During the 2008 Domino Day, held on November 14, the same team aimed to set ten records, including:

1. Longest domino spiral (200 m)
2. Highest domino climb (12 m)
3. Smallest domino tile (7 mm)
4. Largest domino tile (4.8 m)
5. Longest domino wall (16 m)
6. Largest domino structure (25,000 tiles)
7. Fastest topple of 30 metres of domino tiles (4.21 sec, time by Churandy Martina: 3.81 sec)
8. Largest number of domino tiles resting on a single domino (1002 tiles) for more than 1 hour
9. Largest rectangular level domino field (1 million tiles)
10. A new record of 4,345,027 tiles

This record attempt was held in the WTC Expo hall in Leeuwarden. The artist who toppled the first stone was the Finnish acrobat Salima Peippo.

A year later, in 2009, the world record of most dominoes toppled in one chain reaction was set to be 4,491,863 in Leeuwarden.

In 1998, the Netherlands hosted a domino toppling exhibition called Domino D-Day, it was renamed Domino Day, following the initial 1998 event. It ran annually until 2009, and has been suspended due to financial and administrative issues since 2010. Domino Day made popular the concept of the "Builder's Challenge" wherein the build team must place dominoes into the project once the topple has already begun in order to complete the build in a "race against the clock" type challenge.

In 2006, Griness introduced a corporate team-building challenge featuring domino toppling. On November 9, 2009, giant domino tiles were toppled in commemoration of the 20th anniversary of the fall of the Berlin Wall, with former Polish president and Solidarity leader Lech Wałęsa initiating the toppling.

Since 2015, The Incredible Science Machine, an international event involving multiple teams, has been held annually in the United States. As of November 2017, it held the record for the most dominoes toppled in America, totaling just under 250,000.

Another big domino event is the World Domino Collective (formerly the Dutch Domino Team, renamed after bringing builders from other countries as well), which has been held annually since 2010 in Veenendaal, Netherlands. With every project, the number of stones toppled got bigger and bigger, starting at 15.000 dominoes, with the 2025 edition reaching 1 million dominoes (1.070.134 toppled). The team, now reaching 44 members, broke the amateur world record multiple times.

Ever since 2008, at the Brattelboro Museum and Arts Center (BMAC) in Vermont, there have been annual domino topples, started by the Perrucci brothers, then continued by Wright Reactions, ShanesDominoez, Hevesh5, MarDominoes and others. As of 2025, there have been 18 topples at BMAC.

== Science ==
The phenomenon of domino toppling has theoretical implications in fields such as amplification, digital signal processing, and information processing. This has led to speculation about the potential for constructing domino-based computers. Also, dominoes are also commonly used as components in Rube Goldberg machines.

== Films ==
- Lily Topples the World (dir. Jeremy Workman, 2021)
