= Rock Springs (film) =

2026 American horror film

- Directed by: Vera Miao
- Written by: Vera Miao
- Produced by: Stephen Feder; Kiri Hart; Vera Miao; James Lopez; Poppy Hanks; Greta Talia Fuentes; Matthew Lindner; Jason Michael Berman; Jordan Moldo
- Starring: Kelly Marie Tran; Benedict Wong; Jimmy O. Yang
- Cinematography: Heyjin Jun
- Edited by: David Marks
- Music by: Robert Aiki Aubrey Lowe
- Production companies: Counterculture; A/Vantage Pictures; Macro Film Studios; Juniper Productions; Mandalay Pictures; Gold House
- Release date: January 25, 2026 (Sundance)
- Running time: 97 minutes
- Countries: United States; Canada
- Language: English

Rock Springs is a 2026 horror film written and directed by Vera Miao, in her directorial debut. It stars Kelly Marie Tran, Benedict Wong, and Jimmy O. Yang.

Rock Springs premiered on January 25, 2026, in the Midnight section of the 2026 Sundance Film Festival. It received positive reviews.

== Premise ==
Centers on a grieving family who move to a new town after a tragedy, only to find sinister secrets lurking in the woods behind their house.

== Cast ==
- Kelly Marie Tran as Emily
- Benedict Wong as Ah Tseng
- Jimmy O. Yang as He Yew
- Fiona Fu as Nai Nai
- Aria Kim as Gracie
- Ricky He
- Cardi Wong
- Tanja Dixon-Warren

== Production ==
In October 2024, it was announced that principal photography had begun in Vancouver for a new horror film written and directed by Vera Miao. It stars Kelly Marie Tran, Benedict Wong, and Jimmy O. Yang. Filming wrapped on November 26, 2024.

== Release ==
Rock Springs premiered in the Midnight section of the 2026 Sundance Film Festival on January 25, 2026.

== Reception ==
On the review aggregator website Rotten Tomatoes, 72% of 29 critics' reviews are positive.
