= Lloyd Stephen Riford Jr. =

American politician (1924–2025)

Steve Riford

Member of the New York Senate from the 50th district
- In office 1983–1986
- Preceded by: Tarky Lombardi Jr.
- Succeeded by: James L. Seward

Member of the New York State Assembly
- In office 1971–1983

Personal details
- Born: Lloyd Stephen Riford Jr. February 29, 1924 Auburn, New York, U.S.
- Died: July 20, 2025 (aged 101) Kihei, Hawaii, U.S.
- Party: Republican
- Education: Princeton University (AB)

Military service
- Battles/wars: World War II

Lloyd Stephen Riford Jr. (February 29, 1924 – July 20, 2025) was an American politician from New York.

== Early life and education ==
Riford was born on February 29, 1924, in Auburn, New York, the son of Lloyd Stephen Riford Sr. (1889–1980). He attended Phillips Exeter Academy. During World War II he served as an ambulance driver with the American Field Service. He earned an A.B. from Princeton University in 1948.

== Career ==
After graduating from college, Riford worked in dairy farming. He was a member of the New York State Assembly from 1971 to 1982, sitting in the 179th, 180th, 181st, 182nd, 183rd and 184th New York State Legislatures. He was then a member of the New York State Senate from 1983 to 1986, sitting in the 185th and 186th New York State Legislatures. He was Chairman of the Committee on Agriculture.

In 1986, he received the Rhea Eckel Clark Citizenship Award from the Central New York Regional Planning and Development Board.

After retiring from politics, Riford moved to Kihei, Maui, Hawaii, and engaged in agricultural pursuits there.

== Personal life and death ==
On February 29, 2024, Riford celebrated his 100th birthday. The New York State Legislature adopted a resolution in recognition of his centennial. He died on July 20, 2025, at the age of 101.

New York State Assembly
Preceded by George M. Michaels	New York State Assembly; 122nd District; 1971–1972	Succeeded by Clarence D. Rappleyea Jr.
Preceded by Constance E. Cook	New York State Assembly; 125th District; 1973–1982	Succeeded by Hugh S. MacNeil
New York State Senate
Preceded by Tarky Lombardi, Jr.	New York State Senate; 50th District; 1983–1986	Succeeded by James L. Seward
