= Posterchild (street artist) =

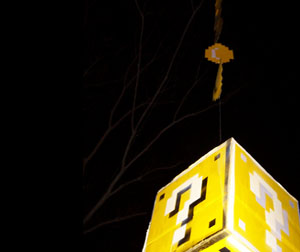
Mario block with coins

Posterchild is the pseudonym of a street artist based in Toronto, Canada who may be best known for his Mario Blocks project, the purpose of which is to install homemade Mario blocks in public spaces. After being featured on Boing Boing the project has expanded as others have made and hung their own blocks.

Posterchild previously ran his own website, called Posterchilds Blade Diary. The term comes from the fact that graffiti stencils are cut using a blade. According to the artist, "I'm not writing this diary with a pen -- I'm using a blade to make my mark." While the website was active, it featured new artwork every weekday, typically a stencil. Usually there is a description of the inspiration for the piece written in the style of a blog. The website also featured a large collection of photos of Posterchild's work, including sticker art, poster art, and various other creative forms of street art. There was also tutorials on how to create various types of street art. The website was last updated in July 2011. Much of the website is still accessible through The Internet Archive.

Previously, some of Posterchild's artwork—a series of stencils of a Betsy McCall paper doll and her dresses—was featured on the front page of the fashion section of The Toronto Star; the artwork was unsigned, which is typical of street art.

In response to the newspaper photo, Posterchild created a stencil of the featured model and placed it on top of the photographed wall in the same place where the model was standing in the photo.

In September, 2007, Posterchild collaborated with fellow artist Jason Eppink to create a series of "Magic Spigots", which were installed around Toronto, Ontario and New York, New York

In 2009, Posterchild built and installed a series of Planter boxes designed to be installed in unused newspaper and flyer boxes.
