= Lily Hevesh =

Domino artist and YouTuber

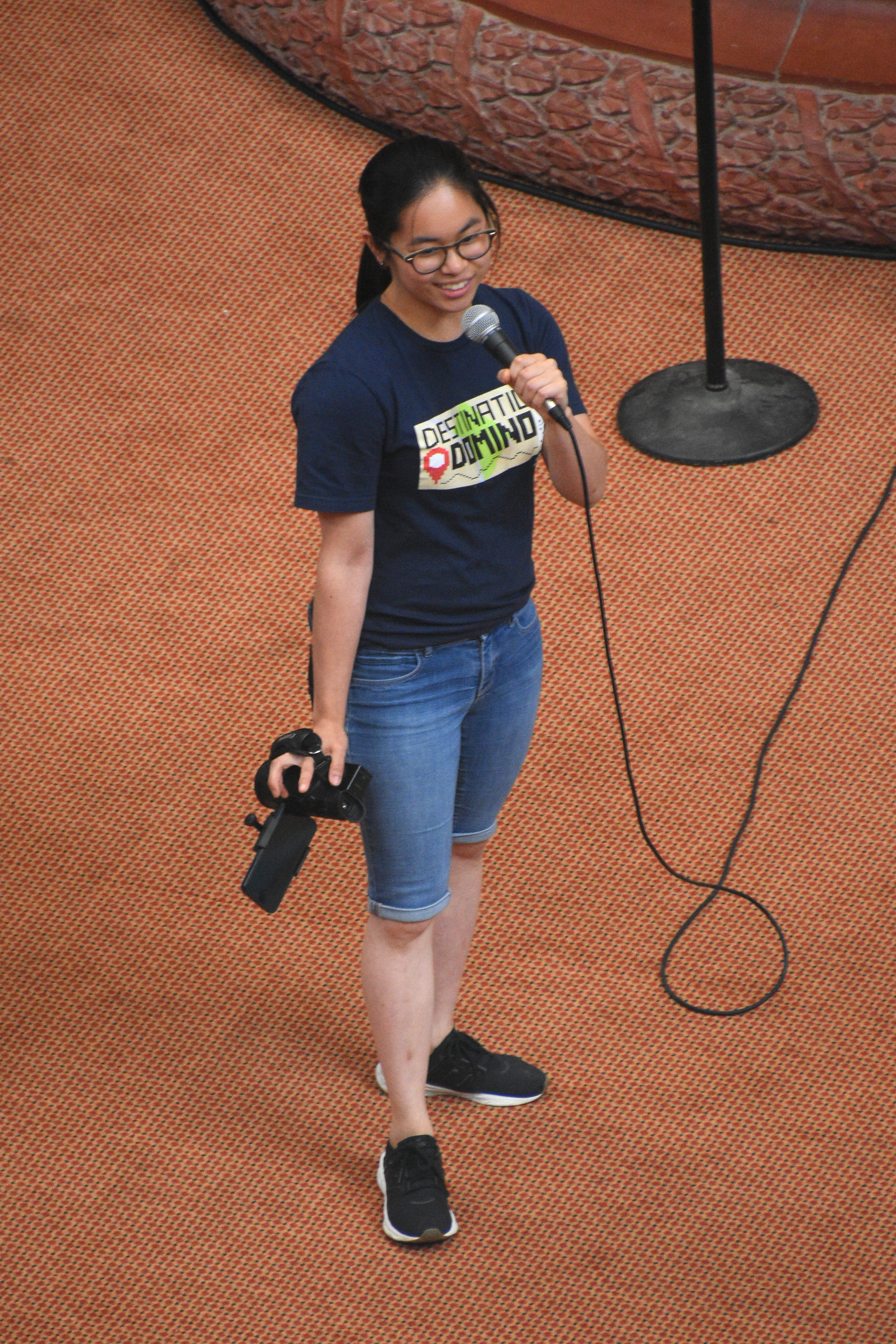
- Hevesh in 2024
- Born: October 2, 1998 (age 28); China
- Occupation: Domino artist

YouTube information
- Channel: Hevesh5
- Years active: 2013–present
- Subscribers: 4.52 million
- Views: 2.35 billion
- Last updated: April 12, 2026
- Website: hevesh5.com

Lily Hevesh (/ˈhɛvɪʃ/ HEV-ish) is an American domino artist and YouTuber working under the channel name Hevesh5.

Hevesh is the subject of the documentary film Lily Topples the World directed by Jeremy Workman and executive produced by actress Kelly Marie Tran.

== Personal life ==
Hevesh was anonymously left as a newborn at an orphanage in China, where she was adopted by an American couple when she was one year old. She has two siblings, Alissa and Matt, and grew up in Sandown, New Hampshire, as the only Asian person in town. Hevesh was given her first set of dominoes at age 10.

Hevesh attended Timberlane Regional High School. She attended Rensselaer Polytechnic Institute, where she was a "Design, Innovation, and Society" major, but left after less than a year to pursue domino art full-time. She currently lives in Massachusetts, west of Boston. She hopes that her work would encourage more children to get involved in STEAM fields.

== Career ==
=== YouTube ===
In 2009, at the age of 10, Hevesh created a YouTube channel called Hevesh5, a reference to her being the fifth member of the family. As of March 2021, her YouTube channel has 3 million subscribers and 1 billion views. Her first viral video, "INSANE Domino Tricks!", was posted in 2013 and had over 163 million views in March 2021.

Hevesh posted anonymously for 6.5 years before revealing her identity in 2015 via a YouTube video.

In December 2018, YouTube used Hevesh's video "A Merry Domino Christmas" on their Twitter account without giving Hevesh credit. After Hevesh tweeted criticism of YouTube for co-opting her video for promotional purposes without crediting her, YouTube publicly apologized and tweeted credit for the video.

Hevesh worked with Endemol Shine North America to create a competitive reality show around building domino effect chains, tentatively called Domino Effect, in the same vein as Endemol's Lego Masters, announced in August 2020. In March 2021, RTL 4 Netherlands and France's M6 ordered local versions of the domino competition format created by Hevesh and Endemol.

=== Domino set ===
In 2020, Hevesh and Spin Master launched H5 Domino Creations at the North American International Toy Fair in New York City. The set comes with 100 improved dominoes which Hevesh described as being "specially made for toppling".

=== Domino art ===
She was approached by Campbell's in 2013 to create a commercial for them. Since 2014, Hevesh's domino art has been featured at the annual Brattleboro Museum and Art Center Domino Toppling Extravaganza.

She has since created ads for companies—such as Prudential Financial, Ford Motors, and Honda— and films such as The Hunger Games: Catching Fire and Despicable Me. She was part of the team commissioned to set up dominoes for a scene in Collateral Beauty. In 2017, Hevesh was hired by Marvel to create a Spider-Man-inspired domino art piece.

== Lily Topples the World ==
In 2021, a documentary about Hevesh titled Lily Topples the World premiered at the virtual South by Southwest, where it won the Grand Jury Prize in the Documentary Feature Film Competition. Soon after, the film won the Audience Award for Best Documentary at the 2021 San Francisco International Film Festival. It was directed by Jeremy Workman. Lily Topples The World was produced by Robert Lyons and executive produced by actress Kelly Marie Tran in her first producing role.

== Awards ==
Hevesh was listed on the 2020 Forbes 30 Under 30 list in the category "Art & Style". She was one of the United States Junior Chamber's Ten Outstanding Young Americans in 2022.
