= Al Carbee =

American artist

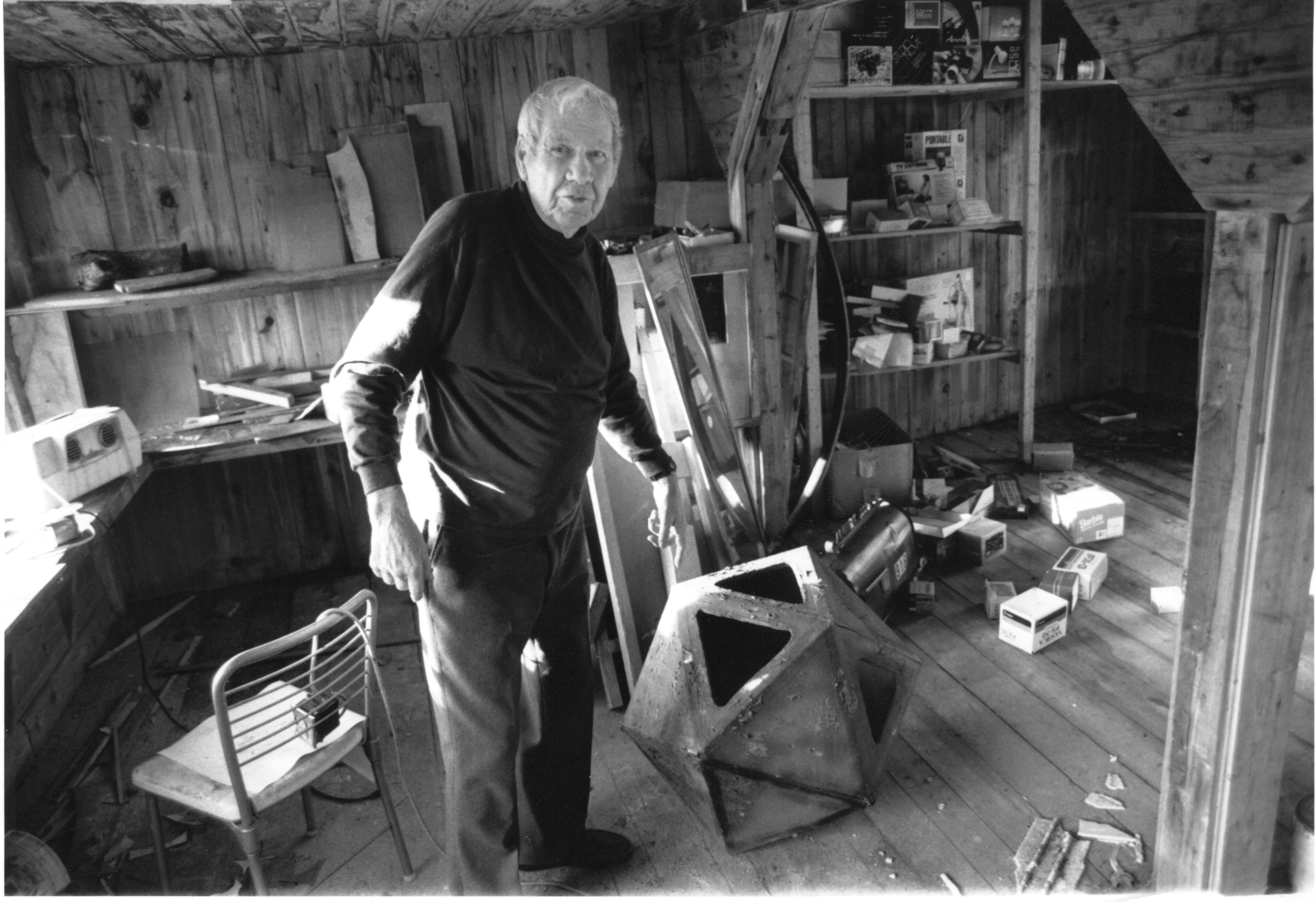
- Carbee in his home studio
- Born: February 10, 1914; Portland, Maine
- Died: October 3, 2005 (aged 91); Saco, Maine
- Known for: Collage, photography, diorama, writing, portraiture
- Movement: Outsider art, folk art
- Spouse: Edna Carbee

Albert Nickerson Carbee (February 10, 1914 – October 3, 2005) was a reclusive artist from Saco, Maine whose mixed media artwork merges collage, photography, diorama, and portraiture. He has been frequently identified as an outsider artist. His work is most commonly noted for enthusiastically featuring photographs and collages of Barbie dolls.

Carbee is the subject of the documentary film Magical Universe (2014) by filmmaker Jeremy Workman.

== Life ==
Al Carbee was born in Portland, Maine on February 10, 1914. After studying at the Portland School of Fine and Applied Art for two years, he moved to Boston in 1937 where he attended his uncle Scott Carbee's School of Art. Soon after finishing his studies, he got a job at Sullivan's Photo Service where he worked on municipal photography as a dark-room attendant and photo-finisher. During World War II, Carbee was hired by the Army as a radiographer due to his previous experience and expertise in photography and film development. After the war, Carbee moved to Portland where he built layouts and billboards for the Central Maine Power Company. It was around this time that he met and married his wife, Edna. A few years later they moved to Saco, Maine where he juggled various odd jobs. He opened up his own hobby shop, sold guppies through mail order and built an entire outdoor go-kart racetrack which he ran throughout the 1960s and early 1970s. Throughout this time and after those jobs, Al Carbee continued to make art at a fast pace unbeknownst to his community. His wife found his fascination with Barbies embarrassing and tried to tell him he should keep it hidden. His collection of Barbies were relegated to the attics and basements of his house for many years.

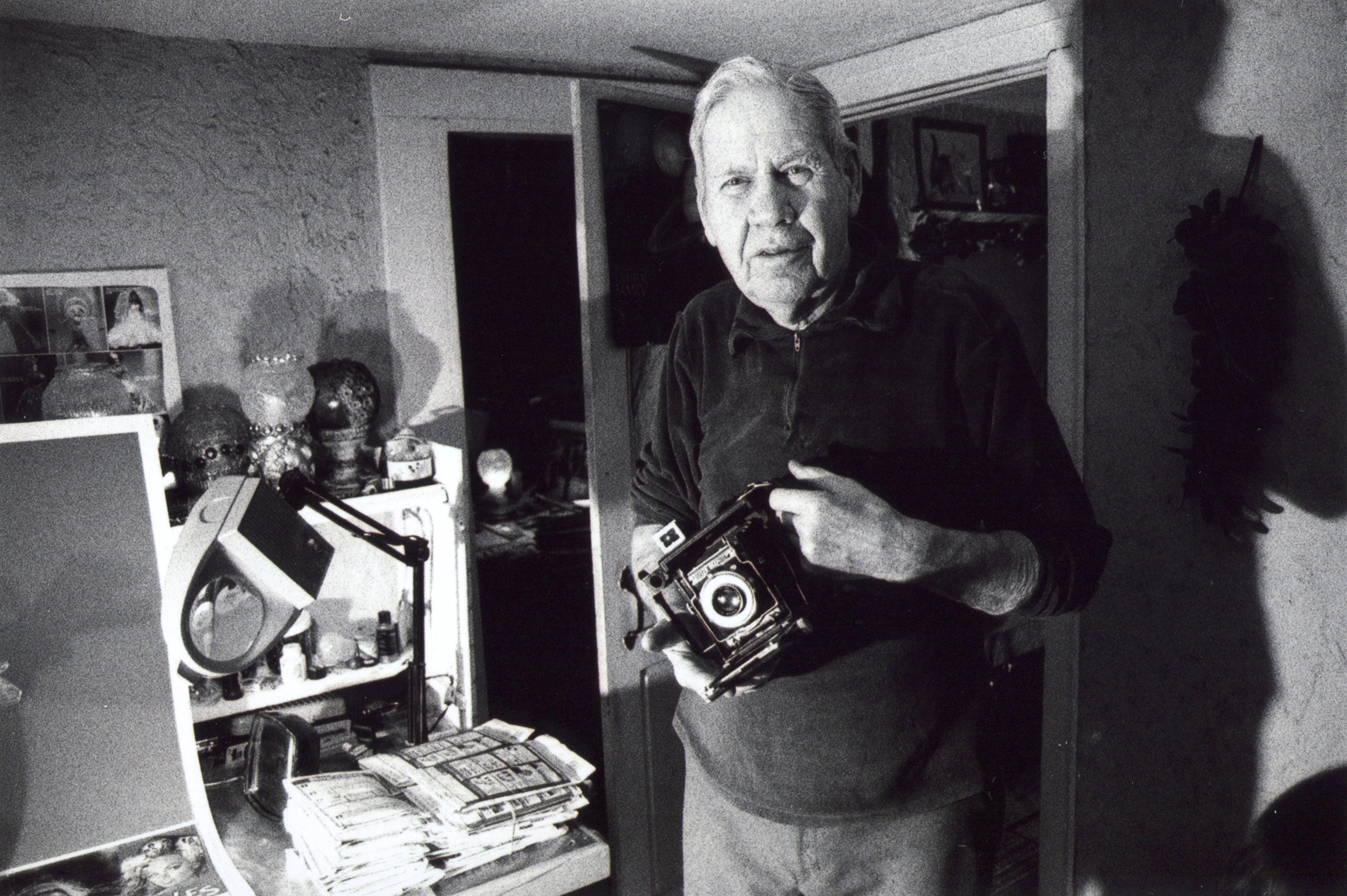
Al Carbee holding one of his many cameras

In 1997, after Carbee's wife Edna died, Carbee's art was discovered by Biddeford-Saco-OOB Courier reporter, Aaron Smith. Soon after, Smith introduced Carbee to filmmaker Jeremy Workman. The two became deep friends and Workman created a 5-minute short documentary on Carbee called Carbee's Barbies. The short film was passed around Saco, and eventually led Carbee to be invited to exhibit his artwork in a one-person retrospective at the local Saco Museum. Carbee's Saco Museum show stands as the only public exhibition of Carbee's artwork during his lifetime. "If anyone knows Barbie, it is Carbee" noted the Bangor Daily News in its coverage of the then 89-year old's debut show at the Saco Museum.

== Art ==
The art of Al Carbee blends multiple genres, including portraiture, photography, collage, diorama, automatic writing, and even the art of collecting. Much of his work, especially his photography, features Barbie dolls uniquely dressed inhabiting various otherworldly environments and living in a magical realm, which he called "Epicuma". After Carbee died, his house was seized by the bank and most of the artwork in his house was destroyed.

Despite the destruction of his home, many of his collages and artwork have survived. Since his death, several art venues and museums have now showcased and examined his body of work.

In the summer of 2016, Al Carbee's artwork was featured as part of the Musee Des Decoratifs Arts major exhibit on Barbie. Carbee's collage work was featured in a section of the exhibit which included artists inspired by Barbie.

== Magical Universe ==
Al Carbee has been the subject of two documentary films by filmmaker Jeremy Workman: a five-minute short film entitled Carbee's Barbies and the feature-length documentary Magical Universe (2014), which was released by IFC Films in October 2014. The first time Jeremy Workman met Carbee, he filmed his home and artwork, which led to the creation of the short film Carbee's Barbies. Carbee's Barbies was shown in some small regional film festivals.

After the release of Carbee's Barbies, Carbee began corresponding with the filmmaker through long type-written letters and rambling video letters. This went on for several years, which led to Carbee's story evolving into the feature-length documentary called Magical Universe.

After winning numerous film festival awards and citations, Magical Universe subsequently was acquired by IFC Films and released theatrically throughout the United States on October 31, 2014. It has garnered wide acclaim and created new interest for the art work of Al Carbee.
