= Providence Place =

Shopping mall in Providence, Rhode Island, United States

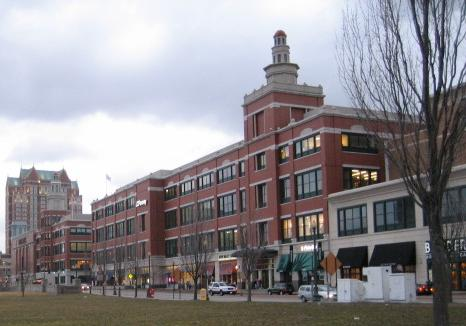
- Providence Place with Omni Providence Hotel at far left in the background
- Location: Providence, Rhode Island, United States
- Coordinates: 41°49′40.58″N 71°24′59.24″W
- Address: One Providence Place
- Opened: August 20, 1999; 27 years ago
- Developer: Commonwealth Development
- Manager: Centennial Real Estate Management
- Owner: Brookfield Properties (legal owner, not manager)
- Num. of stores: 160
- Num. of anchor tenants: 2
- Floor area: 1,400,000 sq ft (130,000 m^{2})
- Floors: 3
- Public transit: Providence station
- Website: providenceplace.com

Providence Place is a large enclosed shopping mall located in downtown Providence, adjacent to the Rhode Island State House and Amtrak's Providence Station. Opened in 1999, the mall comprises approximately 1,400,000 square feet (130,000 m²) of gross leasable area, making it the largest shopping mall in the state. Developed by The Taubman Company, the mall spans three levels and includes a mix of retail stores, restaurants, and entertainment venues. As of 2025, the mall is anchored by Macy's, Boscov's, and Level99 following a series of anchor changes in the 2010s. Providence Place is currently under state receivership due to fiscal insolvency, and is managed by Centennial Real Estate Management LLC.

== History ==
From 1838 to 1877, the site that would become the Providence Place Mall housed the Rhode Island State Prison, notable for the 1845 execution of John Gordon, the last person legally executed in Rhode Island. In 1854, the Rhode Island Normal School, a teacher-training institution, was established on the site. The school later evolved into the Rhode Island College of Education before relocating in 1958 to the Mount Pleasant neighborhood, becoming Rhode Island College. Subsequently, the area served as a parking lot.

The concept for an urban shopping mall in Providence emerged in 1987 under Mayor Joseph R. Paolino Jr. The initial $300 million proposal envisioned three department stores, two office towers, and a luxury hotel, with an anticipated opening in 1991; however, challenges such as securing land from Amtrak and changes in the development team delayed progress by 1990. When Mayor Buddy Cianci returned to office in 1991, he revitalized the project, integrating it into his broader vision for the city's "Renaissance." Cianci worked to secure major anchor tenants, including Macy's and Nordstrom, to ensure the mall's viability.

In 1993, Cianci and Governor Bruce Sundlun traveled to Seattle to persuade the Nordstrom family to open a store in Providence. Despite these efforts, the project faced delays. Elected in 1994, Governor Lincoln Almond opposed the mall project, criticizing its financing structure during his campaign and questioned the mall's long-term viability. Almond would later renegotiate the deal in 1995 to reduce the state's financial risk. Under the new agreement, the developer would privately finance the construction of a 5,000-car parking garage, while the state allowed the developer to retain the first $6 million in annual sales tax receipts for 20 years. Additionally, the city of Providence agreed to waive $4.5 million in property taxes annually for the same period.

=== Construction and opening ===
In 1996, the Providence City Council approved a revised plan with a budget of $360 million. The mall would be constructed on a site previously occupied by a gravel parking lot known as "Ray's Park & Lock." The original design proposal featured a windowless, concrete monolithic Brutalist structure, which drew significant opposition from residents of the city's East Side and Providence City Council due to its stark contrast with the surrounding urban fabric. In response to this criticism, developers revised the plans to create a structure more harmonious with the Providence skyline. The design, led by Providence architect Friedrich St. Florian and Boston-based ADD Inc., aimed to create a structure resembling a small city. The final design incorporated red and yellow brickwork and rooftop turrets, evoking the city’s industrial heritage. Construction of Providence Place commenced in the late 1990s, with the project ultimately costing $460 million—exceeding initial estimates by $100 million. During excavation, workers uncovered the foundations of the former Rhode Island State Prison, leading to archaeological documentation before construction proceeded.

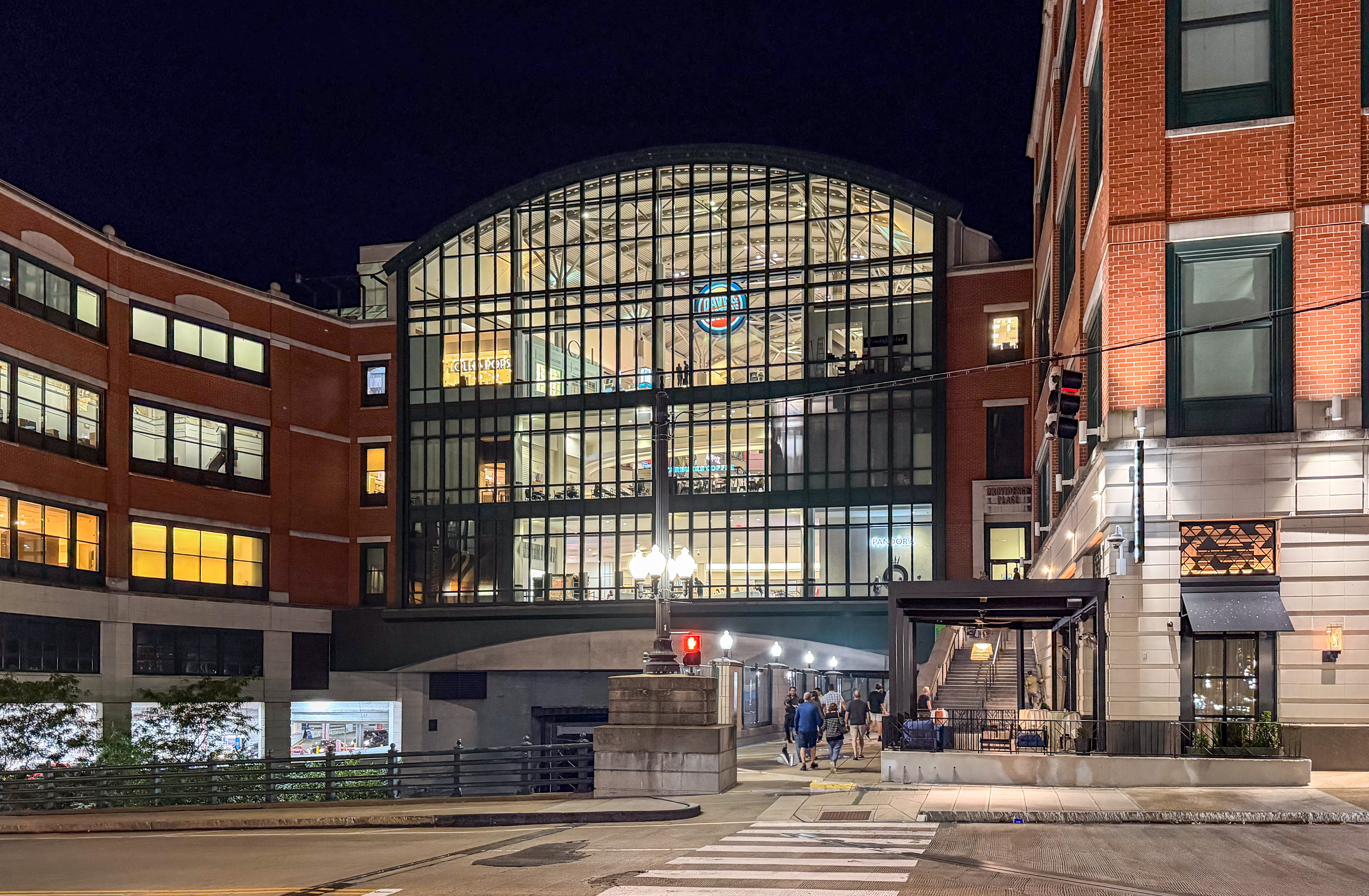
Providence Place Mall exterior at night

Providence Place officially opened to the public on August 20, 1999, under the ownership of General Growth Properties (GGP). The initial anchor stores included Lord & Taylor, Filene's, and Nordstrom. Other major tenants included Dave & Buster’s, a Showcase Cinemas multiplex, and a variety of mid-range and upscale national brands. The mall was initially reported by media as a cornerstone of Providence’s downtown revitalization efforts, joining other major projects such as Waterplace Park and the relocation of the Providence River. The mall’s construction included a large parking garage and a “Skybridge,” a distinctive glass-enclosed walkway over West Exchange Street.

During its first few years, Providence Place saw steady increases in foot traffic and sales. However, local retailers expressed concern over the mall drawing business away from smaller commercial districts located downtown, while urban planners debated the long-term implications of a suburban-style retail model within an urban setting. Parking garage navigation and high parking fees also drew early complaints from visitors. By 2001, the mall had reached near full occupancy. In the wake of the September 11 attacks, the mall faced a brief downturn in shopper activity. In 2003, Lord & Taylor closed its Providence Place location as part of a broader downsizing effort by its parent company, May Department Stores.

=== Secret apartment ===
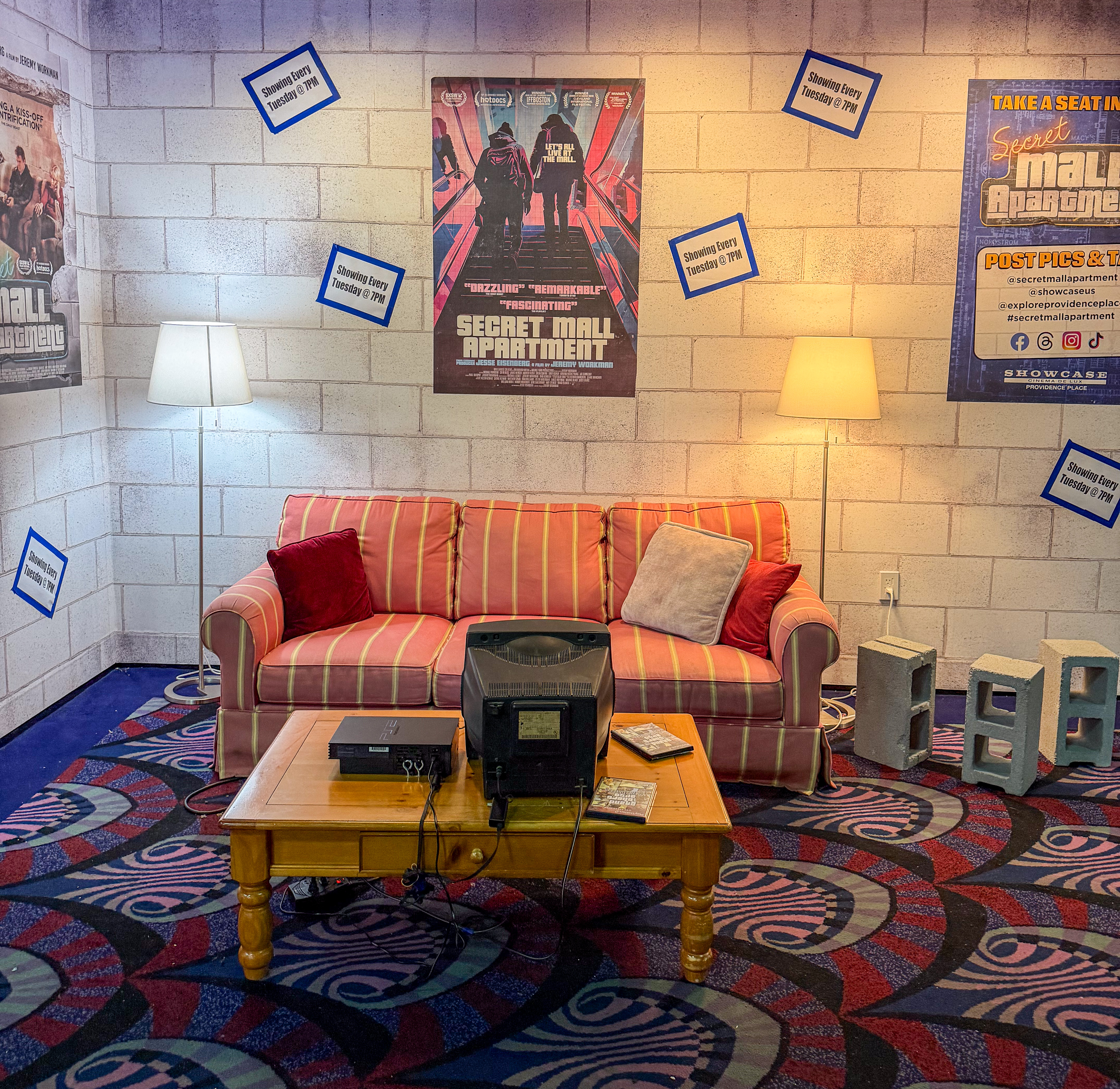
Promotional setpiece for "Secret Mall Apartment" at Providence Place Cinema, which ran the film regularly for over a year

In 2003, after hearing an advertisement which imagined living in the mall, artists Michael Townsend, Adriana Valdez-Young and six others covertly built an apartment in a 750-square-foot (70 m^{2}) hidden space within the inside structure of the building, below the movie theater and adjacent to the parking lot. They were incensed when the mall's development had encroached on their neighborhood of Eagle Square and decided to take a stand against the mall. The apartment remained hidden and secret for over four years. The group lived there for up to three weeks at a time while documenting mall life. A cinderblock wall was built to keep the living space hidden.

The apartment was burglarized at one point, with the occupants' PlayStation 2 game console being stolen. Some sources report that the mall's security guards took the console in an attempt to identify the occupants. The apartment had no running water, so the residents all used the mall bathrooms. Townsend was caught in 2007 after Jaffa Lam, an artist from Hong Kong, visited and was detected by security guards. After the fully furnished apartment was discovered by mall security, Townsend, the head of the artists' cooperative, was initially charged with breaking and entering, but his charges were reduced to trespassing. The story received national attention. Prior to the discovery, he was planning on building a kitchen, installing wooden flooring, and adding a second bedroom. He pleaded no contest to trespassing and was sentenced to probation on October 2, 2007. The mall banned him from entering for life.

In 2024, it was announced that a feature documentary film on the secret apartment had been completed, titled Secret Mall Apartment and directed by filmmaker Jeremy Workman. The documentary was released theatrically in the United States beginning March 21, 2025, including at the cineplex of Providence Place. It was announced that the mall lifted the ban on Michael Townsend in anticipation of the documentary's release.

== Current Operations ==
In 2005, JCPenney opened at Providence Place, taking over the space formerly occupied by Lord & Taylor. A year later, in 2006, Filene’s was converted into Macy’s following the acquisition of May Department Stores by Federated Department Stores. During the early 2010s, Providence Place experienced a series of store closures. Borders Books closed its location following the company's bankruptcy in 2011. Other retailers, such as Arden B., Bailey, Banks & Biddle, and The Body Shop, also ceased operations at the mall during this period. In 2015, JCPenney announced the closure of its Providence Place store as part of a plan to shutter 40 stores nationwide; the store officially closed on August 28, 2015.

Throughout 2016, the mall underwent major renovations. The area that JCPenney once occupied was converted into parking, and a guidance system was later added. Stateside Parking was renamed to "North Garage", and Cityside Parking was renamed to "South Garage". On August 28, 2018, Brookfield Properties would acquire the mall when its affiliate Brookfield Property Partners completed the purchase of General Growth Properties for approximately $9 billion. In January 2019, Nordstrom, an original anchor tenant since the mall's opening in 1999, closed its Providence Place location. To fill the vacancy left by Nordstrom, Boscov's opened its third New England location at Providence Place on September 26, 2019.

On March 16, 2020, the City of Providence ordered the mall to close until further notice due to the COVID-19 pandemic. Providence Place Mall reopened to the public on June 1, 2020; however, the closure accelerated a trend of declining occupancy that had begun in the early 2010s. On June 1, 2020, Providence Place suffered damage after people protesting the murder of George Floyd looted 12-18 stores. Providence Place pursued a shift toward experiential retail due to market shifts; in 2022, several non-traditional tenants opened, including entertainment venues, pop-up stores, and regional food vendors.

=== Default and receivership ===
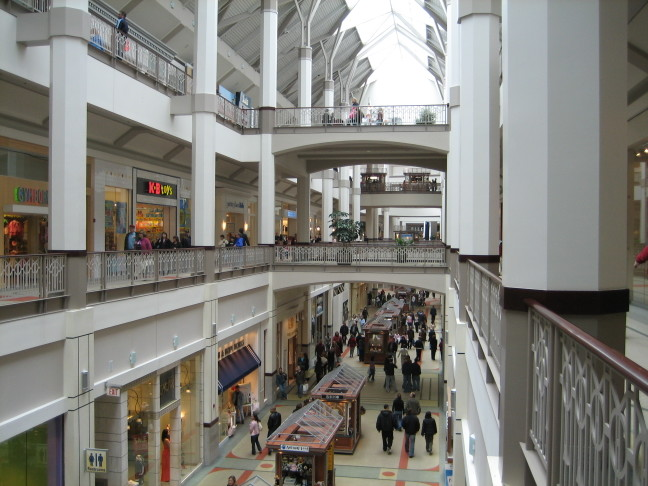
Inside Providence Place

Throughout 2023, the mall faced continued economic pressures, leading to tenant turnover and vacancies. In January 23, 2024, Level99, an interactive gaming and dining venue, opened on the mall’s third floor, replacing the long-vacant former JCPenney space. In October 2024, Rhode Island Superior Court ordered Providence Place into state receivership after lenders alleged that Brookfield defaulted on a $305 million loan and now owed nearly $259 million in principal and interest. The receivership process aimed to stabilize the property’s finances and maintain tenant leases while seeking a potential buyer for the mall. Centennial Real Estate Management LLC replaced Brookfield Properties as the mall's operator in November 2024, while Brookfield retained legal ownership of the property. A $500,000 receivership bond was issued to maintain daily operations. Centennial retained existing on-site managers to ensure continuity during the transition. Amid these changes, Macy's, another anchor tenant, was listed for sale the same month in November 2024, raising concerns about its future at Providence Place. While Macy's has a long-term lease, the company had previously announced plans to close 150 underperforming locations nationwide by 2026.

In February 2025, receiver John Dorsey announced plans for significant upgrades to Providence Place, including improvements to the parking garage infrastructure and increased security policies. On March 24, 2025, the mall implemented a youth policy which mandated that individuals under 18 must be accompanied by an adult aged 21 or older after 5 p.m. daily. On May 20, 2025, Providence Place Mall announced its first parking rate increase in over a decade, set to take effect on June 1, 2025. The announcement was met with significant backlash from tenants and the community; in response, the planned parking rate increases were indefinitely paused on May 29. On June 6, 2025, John Dorsey stepped down as the mall's receiver.

Providence Place was approved for listing in August 2025, following the approval of a brokerage agreement. In September 2025, Showcase Cinemas indicated it would leave Providence Place in January 2026. In response, Providence Place receiver Mark Russo sought court approval to terminate Showcase’s lease early and purchase its equipment at market value to expedite securing a replacement tenant. In October 2025, it was announced that Apple Cinemas would replace Showcase Cinemas, with operations expected to begin in early November 2025.

== List of anchor stores ==
Store Name	Year opened	Year closed	Notes
Macy’s	2006	—	Replaced Filene’s; remains open as of 2025, though its future is uncertain due to a nationwide downsizing plan.
Boscov’s	2019	—	Occupies the former Nordstrom space on the north end of the mall.
Level99	2024	—	Interactive entertainment venue located in the former JCPenney space.
Apple Cinemas 16 & IMAX	1999	—	Located on the third level; includes a 16-screen theater and IMAX.
Dave & Buster’s	1999	—	Entertainment and dining venue adjacent to the cinema.
Nordstrom	1999	2019	Original anchor tenant; space now occupied by Boscov’s.
Filene’s	1999	2006	Original anchor; converted to Macy’s following acquisition.
Lord & Taylor	1999	2004	Original anchor; space later occupied by JCPenney.
JCPenney	2005	2015	Replaced Lord & Taylor; space now partially used by Level99 and parking.

== See also ==
- Warwick Mall: Single-level regional mall located in Warwick, Rhode Island
- Rhode Island Mall: Former enclosed shopping mall located in Warwick; converted to open-air power center in 2011
- Emerald Square Mall: Three-level regional mall located in North Attleborough, Massachusetts
