= Jeremy Workman =

American filmmaker and editor

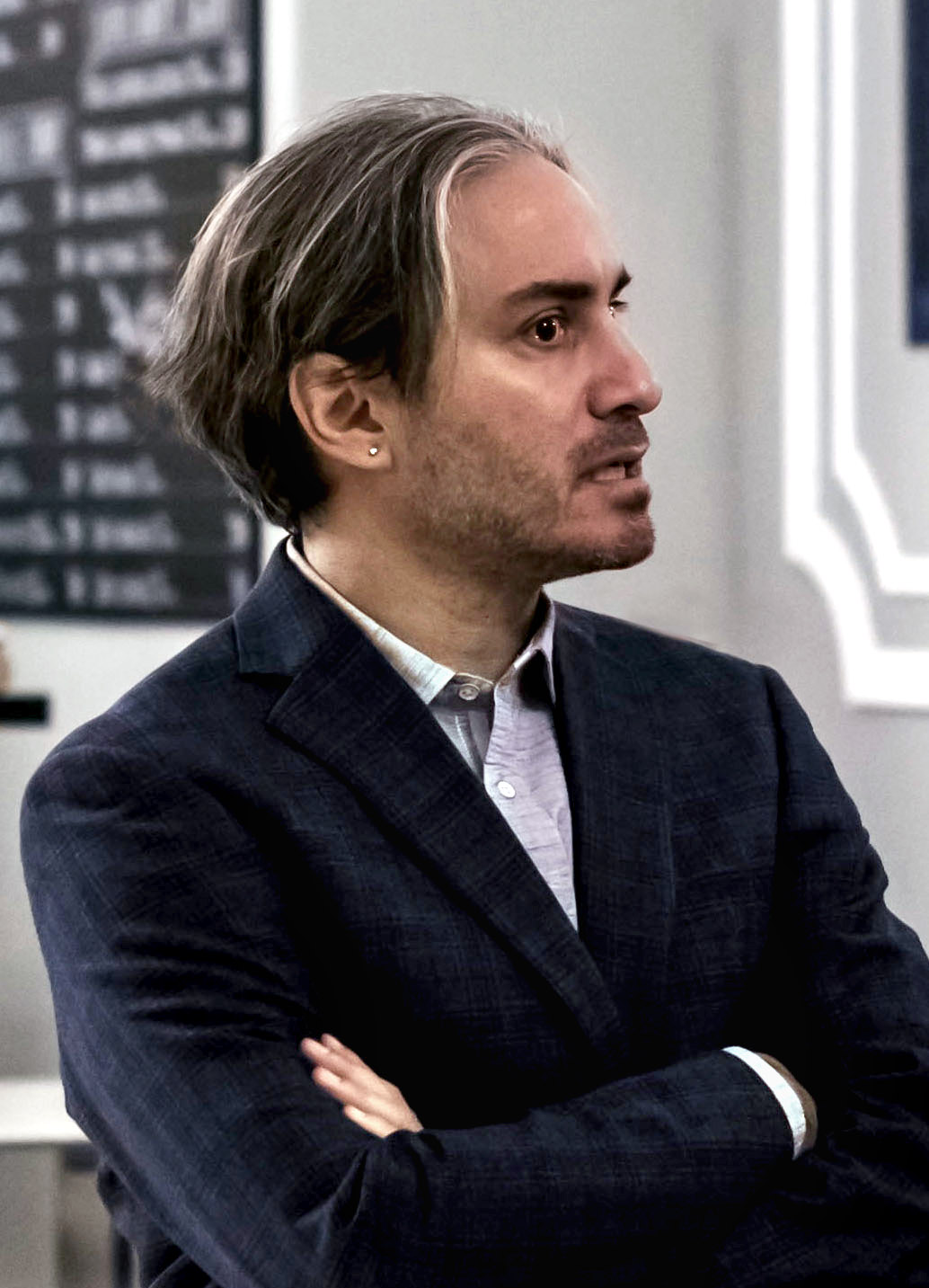
- Workman at Illyuzion Theater, Moscow in 2019
- Born: New York City, U.S.
- Education: Columbia University
- Occupations: Filmmaker, editor
- Known for: Secret Mall Apartment, Lily Topples The World, The World Before Your Feet

Jeremy Workman is an American filmmaker and editor. His documentary films frequently focus on artists, eccentrics, outsiders, and those with extreme passions. His acclaimed films include School For Defectors, Secret Mall Apartment, Deciding Vote, Lily Topples The World, The World Before Your Feet, Magical Universe, and Who Is Henry Jaglom? In many of his films, Workman serves as the director, cinematographer, and editor.

== Early life ==
Jeremy Workman was born in New York City and grew up in Los Angeles. He is the son of filmmaker/editor Chuck Workman and began editing documentary projects under his father's tutelage when he was in his teenage years. He earned a Bachelor of Arts in English Literature from Columbia University and he has been featured as a distinguished alumni at Columbia University School of the Arts.

== Career ==
Workman's debut film, Who Is Henry Jaglom? (co-directed with Henry Alex Rubin) was presented at numerous film festivals before premiering on PBS's acclaimed documentary series POV. The documentary on filmmaker Henry Jaglom has a 86% positive rating on Rotten Tomatoes.

Workman's 2014 documentary Magical Universe was released theatrically on October 31, 2014, with IFC Films. The film is about reclusive outsider artist Al Carbee who created elaborate dioramas and collages featuring Barbie dolls. The film grew out of Workman's 2002 short film Carbee's Barbies and encompasses the final years of Carbee's life, a time when Workman was Carbee's closest friend and his only link to the outside world. The film won several film festival awards.

Workman's 2018 documentary The World Before Your Feet premiered in competition at the 2018 SXSW Film Festival and was acquired by distributor Greenwich Entertainment. The documentary, about Matt Green's mission to walk every street of New York City, was widely hailed upon its release. It was a New York Times Critic's Pick, a Los Angeles Times Critics Choice, and has a 100% positive rating on Rotten Tomatoes. The film also marked the producing debut of actor Jesse Eisenberg. The film played in movies theaters across the United States for over a year and then returned to theaters in 2025.

Workman's 2021 documentary, Lily Topples The World, about domino toppling artist Lily Hevesh, premiered at the 2021 SXSW Film Festival where it was awarded Grand Jury Prize for Best Documentary. Soon after, the film won the Audience Award for Best Documentary at the 2021 San Francisco International Film Festival. Actress Kelly Marie Tran serves as an Executive Producer, which marks her producing debut. In May 2021, it was announced that the documentary was a high-profile acquisition of Discovery+. Celebrated by critics, the film has a 91% rating on Rotten Tomatoes.

Workman's 2023 short documentary Deciding Vote, about Assemblyman George M. Michaels and his deciding vote in New York's 1970 abortion bill, premiered at Tribeca Film Festival, was released on The New Yorker, was Shortlisted for the 96th Academy Awards in the Documentary Short Film category, and was nominated for a News and Documentary Emmy Award for Most Outstanding Short Documentary.

Workman's 2024 documentary, Secret Mall Apartment, premiered at the 2024 SXSW Film Festival to wide acclaim. It is about eight young Rhode Island artists who covertly built an apartment in a 750-square-foot (70 m^{2}) empty space inside the architecture of the Providence Place Mall in 2003 after hearing an advertisement about imagining living in the mall. The crew lived secretly within the busy mall for nearly four years, filming much of their activity using inexpensive Pentax Optio cameras that they purchased at the mall's RadioShack and concealed in Altoids tins. Actor Jesse Eisenberg serves as an executive producer, a role he previously served on Workman's The World Before Your Feet. Despite receiving interest from numerous film distributors for Secret Mall Apartment, Workman decided to self-release the film himself. It went on to become one of 2025's biggest documentary box office hits. Celebrated by critics, Secret Mall Apartment is "Certified Fresh" and has a 98% rating on Rotten Tomatoes.

Following Secret Mall Apartment, Workman began filming School For Defectors, a documentary about a tiny boarding school in South Korea in which all 20 students are North Korean defectors. School For Defectors premiered at film festivals in 2026, winning several film festival awards in the process. Among its producers are actor Daniel Dae Kim, activist Hannah Song and entrepreneur Blaine Vess.

In 2026, Workman began production on a feature-length documentary about Rube Goldberg machines, focusing on YouTube personality Joseph Herscher.

In addition to being a director, Workman is known for his film editing, primarily as a sought-after editor of movie trailers for indie and documentary films. He has edited over 100 movie trailers and frequently speaks about trailers and movie marketing to filmmakers and film communities throughout the world.

On February 2, 2023, Workman is credited as being the first person to spot Flaco (owl), a Eurasian eagle-owl that had escaped from New York City's Central Park Zoo. Workman encountered the owl on Fifth Avenue, took several photographs, and contacted documentary filmmaker Penny Lane (filmmaker), who subsequently directed Wild Inside (2026), an HBO documentary about Flaco. Workman also appears in the film.

== Filmography ==
- Who Is Henry Jaglom? (1997)
- One Track Mind (2005)
- Magical Universe (2014)
- True New York (2016)
- The World Before Your Feet (2018)
- Lily Topples The World (2021)
- Deciding Vote (2023)
- Secret Mall Apartment (2024)
- School For Defectors (2026)
