= Domino Rally =

Toy

Domino Rally (also known as Domino Express) is a toy product manufactured by Pressman Toys in the late 1980s, 1990s and early 2000s. It was originally named "Domino Track" and designed by Jason Carroll, a 16-year-old boy, assisted by his father. The design was submitted to American Idea Management (AIM). Due to lack of knowledge and finances of the original inventor, the idea was successfully patented by Universal Product Innovations, Inc. and was manufactured by Pressman Toys Inc.

== Features ==
Different sets were produced, each consisting of several hundred multicolored plastic dominoes. They were not solid rectangular prisms, but rather were hollowed out on one side. The injection molding process used to make them also tended to leave protrusions on the standing edge. As such, they tended to fall over easily, particularly when being set up on the stepped staircases and bridges that came with the set. Newer dominoes were made which left the plastic in the middle, resulting in the dominoes standing upright much better than before.
