= Lily Topples the World =

2021 American documentary film

- Movie poster
- Directed by: Jeremy Workman
- Produced by: Jeremy Workman; Robert J. Lyons
- Starring: Lily Hevesh
- Cinematography: Jeremy Workman; Michael Lisnet
- Edited by: Jeremy Workman
- Music by: Carly Comando
- Production company: Wheelhouse Creative
- Distributed by: Discovery+
- Release date: March 16, 2021 (SXSW)
- Running time: 90 minutes
- Country: United States
- Language: English

Lily Topples the World is a 2021 American documentary film, which follows acclaimed domino toppler Lily Hevesh as she rises as an artist, role model, and young woman. Directed by Jeremy Workman, the film also marks the producing debut of actress Kelly Marie Tran.

Lily Topples the World had its world premiere at South by Southwest on March 16, 2021, where it won the Grand Jury Award for Best Documentary. Soon after, the film won the Audience Award for Best Documentary at the 2021 San Francisco International Film Festival. In May 2021, it was announced that the documentary was a high-profile acquisition of Discovery+. It was released on Discovery+ for streaming on August 26, 2021, as well as a limited theatrical release on August 27, 2021.

== Synopsis ==
The film is a coming-of-age story of 20-year-old Lily Hevesh, the world's most acclaimed domino artist and the only woman in her field.

== Reception ==
The film was widely praised by critics. On the review aggregator website Rotten Tomatoes, 91% of 47 critics' reviews are positive, with an average rating of 7.30/10. The website's consensus reads: "A layered look at fame in the digital era, Lily Topples the World benefits immensely from a subject with an uplifting story and immense charm." Metacritic, which uses a weighted average, assigned the film a score of 55 out of 100, based on four critics.

Kalyn Corrigan of /Film gave the film a nine out of ten rating, stating that the film is "a much needed serotonin boost that will have you grinning from start to finish".

== Awards ==
- South by Southwest, Grand Jury Award Best Documentary
- San Francisco International Film Festival, Audience Award Best Documentary
- 15th Cinema Eye Honors, Audience Choice Prize Nominee and "The Unforgettables" Distinction
