= The World Before Your Feet =

- Directed by: Jeremy Workman
- Produced by: Jeremy Workman, Jesse Eisenberg
- Cinematography: Jeremy Workman
- Edited by: Jeremy Workman
- Music by: Carly Comando, Max Avery Lichtenstein, Tom Rosenthal, Rhonda Mackert
- Distributed by: Greenwich Entertainment
- Release dates: March 2018 (South by Southwest); November 21, 2018
- Running time: 96 minutes
- Country: United States
- Box office: $328,644

The World Before Your Feet is a 2018 American documentary film directed by filmmaker Jeremy Workman about Matt Green's mission to walk every street of New York City, a journey of over 8,000 miles. The film also marked the producing debut of actor Jesse Eisenberg.

The World Before Your Feet premiered at the South by Southwest film festival, and was released theatrically on November 21, 2018, through Greenwich Entertainment. Widely praised upon its release, the documentary holds a 100% rating on Rotten Tomatoes.

== Release ==
The documentary premiered in competition at the 2018 South by Southwest Film Festival, where it was acquired by distributor Greenwich Entertainment. It was released theatrically on November 21, 2018, screening in over 70 cities across the United States and Canada and playing in theaters for over a year.

Following its theatrical run, the film was subsequently made available on multiple streaming sites. A special edition DVD/Blu-ray was released through Kino Lorber. The film was also widely released in Germany with distributor Happy Entertainment under the title New York Die Welt vor deinen Füßen

The documentary then returned to American movie theaters in 2025, following Matt Green's completion of his New York City walking project.

== Reception ==
The film was widely praised upon its release. It has a 100% positive rating on Rotten Tomatoes, based on 31 reviews. The website's critics consensus reads, "The World Before Your Feet offers a perspective on New York City that might be entrancingly unfamiliar even to residents -- and beckons viewers toward a more attentive way of life." On Metacritic, it has a weighted average score of 78 out of 100, indicating "favorable reviews".

The film was a Critic's Pick in The New York Times, in which critic Ben Kenigsberg stated that "after watching The World Before Your Feet, it’s difficult to look at the city the same way." It was a Critic's Choice of the Los Angeles Times, in which critic Michael Rechtshaffen stated that the film is "inspiring and enlightening... Filmmaker Workman, who's behind [Green] every step of the way without ever getting in the way, allows the city and its colorful denizens to take center stage." Entertainment Weekly called the film "an eye-opening stroll with a stranger" while The Playlist described it as "an utterly compelling joy." San Francisco Chronicle, in a positive review, said, "It's hard to see Green in action and not think of traditional pilgrims on holy journeys and, perhaps, hermits or monks or others who have withdrawn from regular life". Rex Reed of The New York Observer stated, "New York, New York, it's a wonderful town. This movie proves it like none other."
