= List of munitions used by the Israeli Air Force =

Equipment list

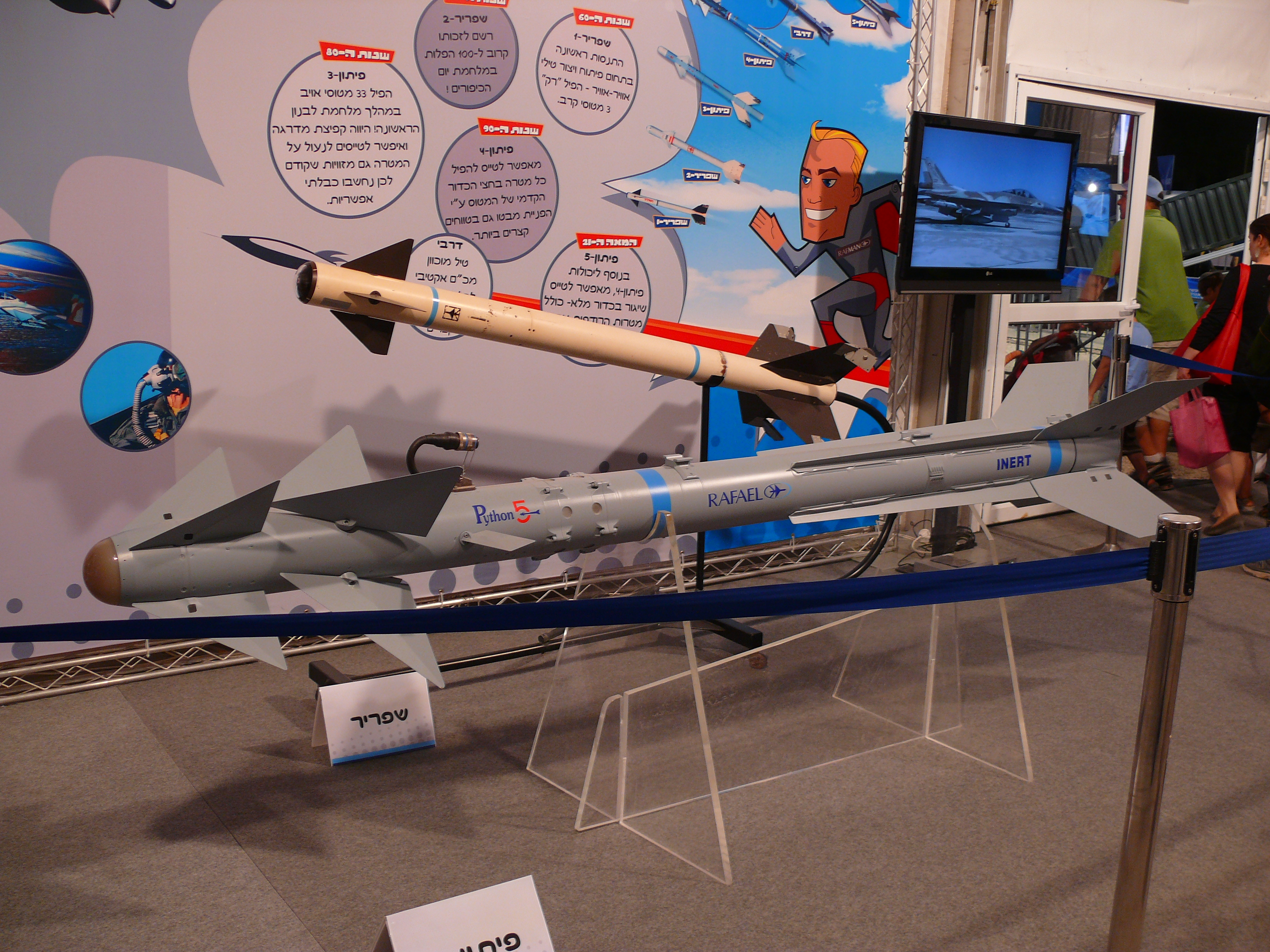
Python 5 (foreground)

This List of Munitions of the Israeli Air Force lists the missiles, bombs and related equipment in use by the Israeli Air Force.

== Air-to-air missiles ==
Model	Origin	Role	Notes
AIM-7 Sparrow	United States	Medium-range air-to-air missile	
AIM-9 Sidewinder	United States	Short-range air-to-air missile	
AIM-120 AMRAAM	United States	Medium-range air-to-air missile	
Derby	Israel	Medium-range air-to-air missile	Active radar homing missile
Python 3	Israel	Short-range air-to-air missile	In limited use
Python 4	Israel	Short-range air-to-air missile	
Python 5	Israel	Short-range air-to-air missile	Latest Python variant
Sky Sting	Israel	Long-range air-to-air missile	Under development by Rafael

== Air-to-surface missiles ==
Model	Origin	Role	Notes
AGM-65 Maverick	United States	Air-to-ground missile	
AGM-88 HARM	United States	Air-to-ground anti-radiation missile	
AGM-114 Hellfire	United States	Air-to-ground missile	
AGM-142 Popeye	Israel	Air-to-ground cruise missile	In limited use
Delilah	Israel	Air-to-ground loitering munition	
AGM-84 Harpoon	United States	Air-to-ground missile	Updated variants in service
Sky Sniper	Israel	Air-to-ground missile	
Ice Breaker	Israel	Air launched cruise missile	
ROCKS	Israel	Air launched long range missile	
RAMPAGE	Israel	Air launched long range missile	
Air LORA	Israel	Air launched ballistic missile	
Wind Demon	Israel	Air-to-ground cruise missile	First revealed in 2024

== Bombs and Guidance Kits ==
Model	Origin	Role	Notes
GBU-12 Paveway II	United States		500lbs laser guided bomb
GBU-15	United States		2,000lbs precision guided bomb
GBU-16 Paveway II	United States		1,000lbs laser guided bomb
GBU-27 Paveway III	United States	Bunker busting capabilities	2,000lbs laser guided bomb
GBU-28	United States	Bunker busting capabilities	4,000lbs laser guided bomb
GBU-31	United States	Joint-Direct Attack Munition (JDAM)	2,000lbs laser guided bomb
GBU-32	United States	Joint-Direct Attack Munition (JDAM)	1,000lbs precision guided bomb
GBU-39/B	United States	Focused-Leathality Munition (FLM)	250lbs precision guided bomb
BLU-109	United States	Hardened Penetration Bomb	550lbs free-fall bomb
MPR-500	Israel		500lbs precision guided bomb
MPR-1000	Israel	Bunker busting capabilities	1000lbs precision guided bomb
MPR-2000	Israel	Bunker busting capabilities	2000lbs precision guided bomb
MLGB	Israel		250lbs laser guided bomb
MSOV	Israel	Stand off capabilities	1,500lbs glide bomb
FASTLIGHT	Israel		110lbs precision guided bomb
M117	United States		750lbs free-fall bomb
Spice 250	Israel	Developed from the AGM-142	250lbs precision guided bomb

Model	Origin	Role	Notes
JDAM	United States		Conversion kits for U.S. supplied bombs
Griffin	Israel		Laser guided conversion kit
Spice	Israel		Precision guided conversion kit
Lizard	Israel	GPS/INS and Laser	Conversion kit for unguided munitions

== Surface-to-air missiles ==
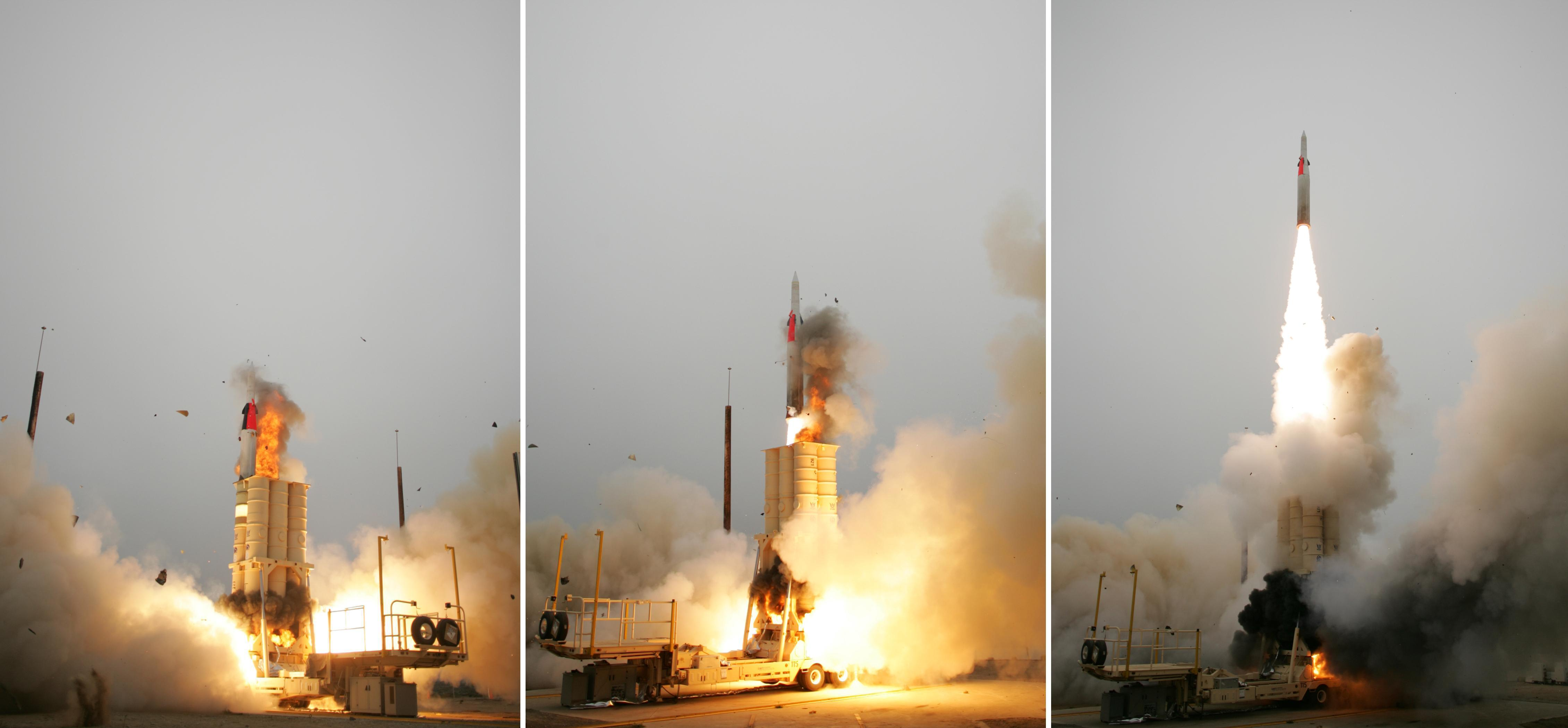
Arrow missile launch

Main Article: Air Defense Command of Israel

Model	Origin	Role	Notes
Arrow	Israel	Theater ballistic missile defense	
MIM-104 Patriot	United States	Air and ballistic missile defense	Retired and transferred by the US to Ukraine in January, 2025
David's Sling	Israel	Air defense	Utilizes AESA radar
Light Blade	Israel	UAV and small craft air defense	First laser based air defense system worldwide
Iron Dome	Israel	Air Defense	
SkySonic	Israel	Hypersonic interceptor	Under development
Iron Beam	Israel	Laser Air Defense	Under development has been used in battle
Red Sky	Israel	Tactical Air Defense	

== Surface-to-surface missiles ==
Model	Origin	Role	Notes
Delilah-GL	Israel	Tactical strike	250km range
LORA	Israel	Quasi-ballistic missile	400km range
Jericho-II	Israel	Nuclear capable ballistic missile	1,700km range
Jericho-III	Israel	Nuclear capable ballistic missile	6,500-11,500km range
Jericho-IV	Israel	Nuclear capable ballistic missile	Unknown range, possibly in development still

== See also ==
- Israel and weapons of mass destruction
