= Interdiction =

Interception while en route to use

Interdiction is interception of an object prior to its arrival at the location where it is to be used in military, espionage, and law enforcement.

== Military ==
In the military, interdiction is the act of delaying, disrupting, or destroying enemy forces or supplies en route to the battle area. A distinction is often made between strategic and tactical interdiction. The former refers to operations whose effects are broad and long-term; tactical operations are designed to affect events rapidly and in a localized area.

=== Types ===
In different theaters of conflict:

- Air: Air interdiction or Interdiction bombing
- Ground: No-drive zone
- Sea: Maritime interdiction or Blockade

== Law enforcement ==
The term interdiction is also used in criminology and law enforcement, such as in the U.S. war on drugs and in immigration.

== Scots law ==
In Scots law, an interdict is a court order to stop someone from breaching someone else's rights, and can be issued by the Court of Session or a Sheriff Court. They are equivalent to an injunction in other legal jurisdictions, such as English law. A temporary interdict is called an interim interdict.

== Espionage ==
=== United States ===
The term interdiction is also used by the NSA when an electronics shipment is secretly intercepted by an intelligence agency (domestic or foreign) for the purpose of implanting bugs before they reach their destination. According to Der Spiegel, the NSA's TAO group is able to divert shipping deliveries to its own "secret workshops" in a method called interdiction, where agents load malware onto the electronics or install malicious hardware that can give US intelligence agencies remote access. The report also indicates that the NSA, in collaboration with the CIA and FBI, routinely and secretly intercepts shipping deliveries for laptops or other computer accessories, such as a computer monitor or keyboard cables with hidden wireless transmitters bugs built-in for eavesdropping on video and keylogging.

=== China ===
In July 2014 it was reported that handheld shipping image scanners manufactured in China were found with pre-installed, weaponized malware which was capable of exfiltrating CRM data and financial data. These scanners are of the type used by many United States retailers and warehouses, as well as delivery services such as United Parcel Service and FedEx. The scanned data was copied and sent out to an established comprehensive command and control connection (CnC) to a Chinese botnet that was terminated at the Shandong Lanxiang Vocational School located in China.
