= Armement Air-Sol Modulaire =

Armement Air-Sol Modulaire (AASM)
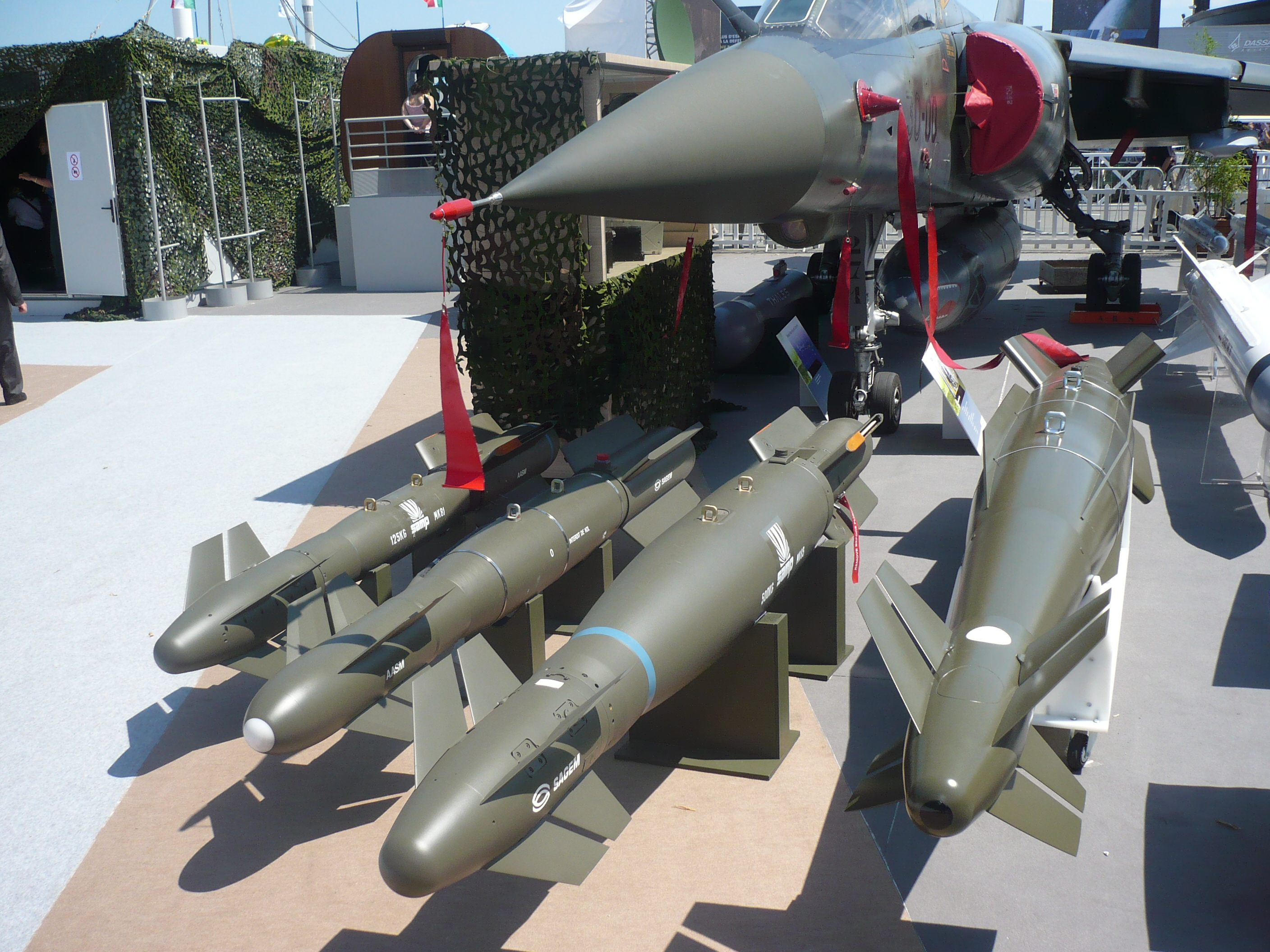
- AASM Hammer family of weapons
- Type: Glide bomb Air-to-surface missile
- Place of origin: France

Service history
- In service: 2007–present
- Used by: French Air and Space Force; French Naval Aviation; Royal Moroccan Air Force; Egyptian Air Force; Qatar Air Force; Indian Air Force; Ukrainian Air Force
- Wars: War in Afghanistan; First Libyan civil war Mali War; Operation Inherent Resolve; Russo-Ukrainian War; 2025 India–Pakistan conflict

Production history
- Manufacturer: Safran Electronics & Defense; Bharat Electronics
- Unit cost: €164,000 (US$210,707) (FY2011) €252,000 (US$323,770) including development costs (FY2011)

Specifications (250 kg (550 lb) version)
- Mass: 340 kg (750 lb)
- Length: 3.1 m (10 ft 2 in)
- Warhead: 250 kg (550 lb) bomb body (Mk82, BLU 111 or CBEMS/BANG)
- Engine: Solid rocket motor
- Operational range: Over 70 km (43 mi)
- Guidance system: Hybrid inertial/GPS in decametric all-weather version Hybrid inertial/GPS + infrared homing or SALH in metric day/night version
- Accuracy: 10 m (32 ft 10 in) CEP decametric version 1 m (3 ft 3 in) CEP metric version
- Launch platform: Dassault Rafale; Dassault Mirage 2000D; Dassault Mirage F1; F-16; Tejas; MiG-29; Su-25; Su-27

The AASM (French: Armement Air-Sol Modulaire, lit. 'Modular Air-to-Ground Armament'), also known as AASM Hammer ("Hammer" standing for "Highly Agile Modular Munition Extended Range"), is a French, all-weather, smart air-to-surface stand-off weapon developed by Safran Electronics & Defense. Meant for both close air support and deep strike missions, the AASM is highly modular.

The AASM consists of a nose-mounted guidance section and a tail-mounted range extension kit (featuring winglets for maneuverability and a rocket booster) attached to either a 125-kilogram (276 lb), 250-kilogram (550 lb), 500-kilogram (1,100 lb) or 1,000-kilogram (2,200 lb) class bomb (such as the Mark 80 series general purpose bombs). There are three variants of the AASM Hammer kit, with different guidance options depending on the target and operational context. The baseline variant features a hybrid inertial navigation system (INS) and a Global Positioning System (GPS) guidance system. The two other variants respectively integrate, in addition to the hybrid INS/GPS guidance system, either an infrared homing or a laser guidance module in the nose-mounted guidance section for increased accuracy, and the ability to hit moving targets.

The AASM entered service in 2007 with the French Air Force and Naval Aviation, equipping the Dassault Rafale.

== Development ==
The program started in 1997, when the Délégation Générale pour l'Armement (DGA), the French defense procurement agency, launched an international competition on the design for the weapon. In 2000, a contract was awarded to SAGEM (that became part of Safran before the end of the development) for an initial lot of AASM GPS/INS bomb kits, expected at the time to be delivered in 2004 and to enter service the following year.

=== Validation ===
A test campaign to validate in flight the main performances of this AASM variant started on 6 December 2004, and ended on 26 July 2005.

While demonstrating excellent results, this campaign showed the need to change some of the aerodynamic features of the weapon. To compensate for delays in AASM deliveries in 2008 France ordered dual-mode (laser- and GPS/INS-guided) GBU-49 Enhanced Paveway II kits for integration with Mirage 2000D and Rafale fighter-bombers. The GPS/INS + IIR guided version completed its qualification tests on 9 July 2008, after three firings at the DGA's missile test range in Biscarosse. This 250 kg IR version performed a night launch from a Rafale fighter-bomber at DGA's Biscarosse test range in December 2010.

According to Safran Electronics & Defense, the weapon was launched at a range of more than 50 km from the target, which was hit within one meter. A 125 kg version was successfully test fired on 27 January 2009, and a laser guided variant was air-launched for the first time on 17 June 2010.

The 1000 kg version commenced testing in 2020, with inert separation trials from a Rafale. Qualification firings finished in early 2023 and a delivery of the first kits started the same year.

=== Cost ===
According to French Senate's Comité des Prix de Revient des fabrications d'Armement (CPRA) cited by the daily La Tribune, the total cost of the AASM program including development costs and the delivery of 2348 kits is €846m. On that basis the per-weapon cost is $300,000 or twelve times the cost of the comparable American JDAM, although the latter has been manufactured in much larger quantities (~250,000 kits) and it would be reasonable to expect a slight reduction of the cost ratio if larger contracts are signed and economies of scale are achieved.

The 2012 defence budget presented to the Senate reported the project had cost €592.2m (~US$800m) with a unit cost of €164,000, or €252,000 including development costs.

In 2017 La Tribune reported a unit cost of €120,000 for a new version called AASM Evolution (Block IV) with the aim by Safran to lower it to €80,000.

== Variants ==
AASM comes in several variants according to its size and the type of guidance used.

- The current model features a 250 kg bomb matched to a nose-mounted guidance kit and a rear-mounted range extension kit, containing a rocket booster and enlarged fins. A 125 kg model was first tested in 2009. The 1000 kg version finished testing in early 2023.
- As for guidance, the basic version combines data from a Global Positioning System (GPS) receiver and an inertial navigation system (INS) unit through Kalman filtering, achieving a 10 metres (32 ft 10 in) circular error probability (CEP). This "decametric" all-weather variant is complemented by a "metric" day/night fair weather version which adds infrared homing (IIR) guidance that matches the target area with a target model stored in its memory for a 1 metre (3 ft 3 in) CEP.
- A third version uses laser guidance instead of IIR allowing it to hit moving targets with more precision. It was qualified in April 2013.

In October 2010, these versions were given alphanumeric designations with the INS/GPS version becoming the SBU-38 (SBU=Smart Bomb Unit), the INS/GPS/IIR version becoming the SBU-64 and the INS/GPS/SALH version becoming the SBU-54; the system as a whole was renamed Hammer to make it more appealing to export customers.

== Operational use ==
The first order for AASM was placed by the DGA in 2000 for a total of 744 units; deliveries started in 2007 after a two-year delay in development. In 2009 a second order for 680 units was placed, by the end of that year deliveries had reached 334.

=== Afghanistan ===
AASM made its combat debut on 20 April 2008, during the War in Afghanistan when a Rafale fighter dropped two in support of ground troops.

=== Libya ===
On 24 March 2011, it was reported that an AASM bomb dropped from a Dassault Rafale was used to destroy a Libyan Air Force G-2 Galeb light ground attack/trainer jet, the first Libyan warplane to challenge the no-fly zone during the 2011 Libyan civil war, on the runway just after the plane had landed at Misrata Airport. On 6 April 2011, it was reported that a AASM bomb dropped from a Dassault Rafale was used to destroy a Libyan tank at a range of 55 km. In Libya, 225 AASM bombs have been dropped.

"Also referred to as the Hammer, the AASM weapon has impressed during the campaign to date. Incorporating a precision guidance kit and propulsion system, the design will eventually be available for use with standard bombs weighing between 125 kg and 1 000 kg, although a 250 kg version is the only one currently in service. Sagem cites a range capability of more than 32nm from high altitude, or 8nm from low level. Launches can also be made from an off-axis angle of up to 90°, while up to six weapons can be fired against individual targets in a single pass and with just one trigger press." And "Libya represents the first opportunity for the French Air and Space to employ the Thales Damocles targeting pod, although the Navy gave the system its combat debut over Afghanistan in late 2010."

=== India ===
According to a report by Hindustan Times, India placed an order for "large numbers" of the Hammer in September 2020 and deliveries will be completed by the end of November 2020. The reports adds that the French Air and Space Force will transfer some of its supplies of Hammer to India to ensure immediate deliveries. India has started the process of integrating Hammer to its indigenous fighter Tejas.

The Indian Air Force deployed Dassault Rafale armed with AASM Hammer during the Operation Sindoor, early in the morning of 7 May 2025, to strike locations in Pakistan.

==== BEL-SED Joint Venture ====
Bharat Electronics and Safran Electronics & Defense signed a memorandum of understanding on 11 February 2025, to establish a joint venture for the production, customization, sales, and upkeep of AASM Hammer in India.

A Joint Venture Cooperation Agreement was signed by Bharat Electronics Limited and Safran Electronics & Defense on 24 November 2025, formalizing the earlier MoU that was signed in February 2025. The joint venture will be established as a private limited company in which both businesses will own 50% of the shares. In order to fulfill the operational requirements of the Indian Air Force and Indian Navy, the joint venture will localize the production, supply, and maintenance of AASM Hammer. Key sub-assemblies, electronics, and mechanical parts would be produced in India, gradually increasing the level of indigenization to 60%. BEL will oversee final assembly, testing, and quality control as the production is transferred in stages.

On 16 February 2026, BEL approved the Project HAMMER which includes the formation of the joint venture, a 50:50 equity Private Limited Company under the Companies Act 2013. The joint venture will operate a Centre of Excellence that will act as "technology and teaming partner for the manufacturing, supply, maintenance and repair of the Guidance Kit of the HAMMER weapon system". The JV will have a board of four directors two nominated by each BEL and SED. The primary users include the Indian Air Force and the Indian Navy. The partnership was one of the agenda during the bilateral meet between French president Emmanuel Macron and Indian prime minister Narendra Modi.

=== Ukraine ===
On 16 January 2024, French president Emmanuel Macron announced France would be providing several hundred AASM Hammer precision-guided weapons to Ukraine, at a rate of 50 units per month in 2024. The first reported use of the AASM by Ukraine took place on 5 March 2024. They have been deployed from MiG-29s, Su-25s and Mirage 2000-5F.

== Operators ==
Map with AASM operators in blue

=== Current operators ===
- France
- Croatia
- Egypt
- India
- Indonesia
- Morocco
- Qatar
- Ukraine

=== Future operators ===
- Serbia

== See also ==
List of rocket assisted guided bombs and jet engine assisted guided bombs

- AGM-123 Skipper II
- AGM-130
- UMPB D-30SN – Russian glide bomb
- H-4 SOW
- Ground Launched Small Diameter Bomb
- Umbani – South African precision-guided bomb kit
- Extended Range Attack Munition – American aerial stand-off munition

List of guided bombs

- Bombe Guidée Laser – French Laser guided bomb
- HGK (bomb) – Turkish precision-guided bomb kit
- JDAM – American GPS bomb guidance kit
- KGGB – South Korean GPS bomb guidance kit
- LS PGB – Chinese precision bombs
- LT PGB – Chinese precision-guided bomb
- Paveway IV – British precision-guided bomb
- Spice – Israeli precision-guided bomb kit
- Sudarshan laser-guided bomb – Indian precision-guided bomb
- UMPK – Russian glide bomb kit
