= FASTLIGHT =

Precision-guided glide bomb

FASTLIGHT is a small dimension, small weight (50 kg/110 lbs) precision guided glide bomb designed from deployment from small platforms that can attack both fixed and moving targets. It was developed by Israel Military Industries (IMI). The relatively light warhead is optimized for such missions where minimum collateral damage is of high importance. It features GPS/INS/Laser guidance with a CEP of 10m.

== See also ==
- Small Diameter Bomb
- Griffin LGB
- Small Smart Weapon
- Spice (bomb)
- MSOV
