= Small Smart Weapon =

- Type: Air-to-surface
- Place of origin: United States

Service history
- Used by: CIA

Production history
- Manufacturer: Lockheed Martin

Specifications
- Mass: 35 pounds (15.88 kg)
- Length: 21.5 inches (55 cm)
- Diameter: 4.25 inches (10.8 cm)
- Warhead: BattleAxe warhead
- Operational range: 10 nautical miles (12 mi; 19 km)
- Guidance system: Semi-active laser homing millimeter wave radar seeker shortwave infrared millimeter wave
- Launch platform: MQ-1 Predator

Small Smart Weapon or Scorpion missile is a new generation small American missile manufactured by Lockheed Martin. It is 21 inches (53 cm) long, weighs 35 pounds (16 kg), is approximately the diameter of a coffee cup and can be fitted with four different types of guidance systems. It was used by CIA in drone attacks in Pakistan in an effort to minimize collateral damage. The Scorpion was a candidate to arm the U.S. Marine Corps' KC-130J Harvest Hawk, but the GBU-44/B Viper Strike bomb and AGM-176 Griffin missile were selected instead.

== See also ==
- Small Diameter Bomb
- FASTLIGHT
