= Humanitarian corridor =

Type of temporary demilitarized zone

A humanitarian corridor is a type of temporary demilitarized zone intended to allow the safe transit of humanitarian aid in, and/or refugees out of a crisis region. Such a corridor can also be associated with a no-fly zone or no-drive zone.

Various types of "humanitarian corridors" have been proposed in the post–Cold War era, put forward either by one or more of the warring parties, or by the international community in the case of a humanitarian intervention. Humanitarian corridors were used frequently during the Syrian Civil War.

== United Nations Safe Areas ==
United Nations Safe Areas (UN Safe Areas) were humanitarian corridors established in 1993 in the territory of Bosnia and Herzegovina during the Bosnian War by several resolutions of the United Nations Security Council.

== List of proposed humanitarian corridors ==
- Siege of Mariupol, March 2022, shut down twice by attacks
- United Nations Safe Areas
- Lachin corridor
- Battle of Grozny (1999–2000)#Siege
- Cyclone Nargis#Activists respond to the blockade of aid
- Humanitarian impact of the Russo-Georgian War
- 2008 Nord-Kivu campaign#Humanitarian aid corridor
- Gaza War (2008–2009)#Humanitarian ceasefires
- First Libyan Civil War#Humanitarian situation
- Safe Zone (Syria)
- Timeline of the 2022 Russian invasion of Ukraine: phase 1#3 March
- Timeline of the Gaza war (7 October 2023 – 27 October 2023)#11 October

== See also ==
- Humanitarian aid in conflict zones
- Opposition to immigration
