= Air interdiction =

Offensive military flying mission

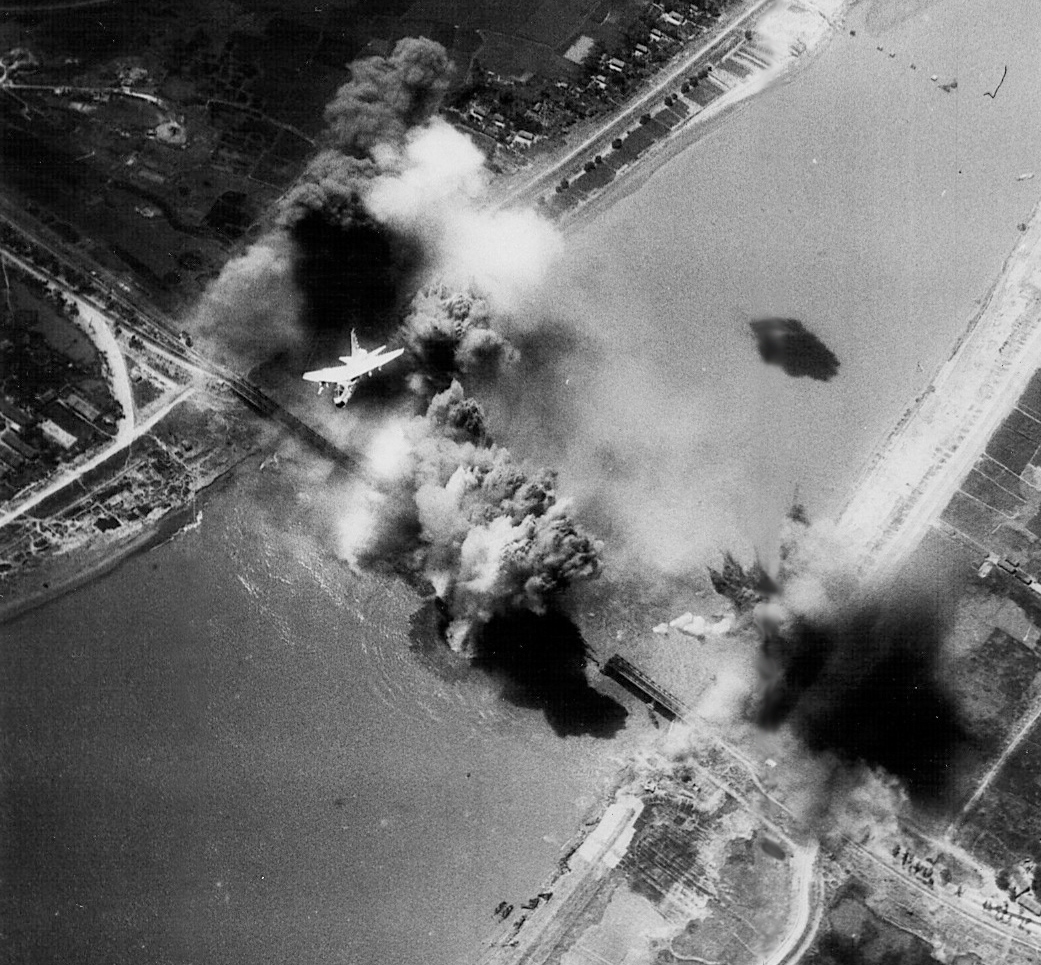
A U.S. Navy A-7E Corsair II bombs the Hai Duong bridge in North Vietnam in 1972.

Air interdiction (AI), also known as deep air support (DAS), is the use of preventive tactical bombing and strafing by combat aircraft against enemy targets that are not an immediate threat, to delay, disrupt or hinder later enemy engagement on friendly forces. It is a core capability of virtually all military air forces, and has been conducted in conflicts since World War I. Aircraft that are used for this purpose are known as interdictors.

A distinction is often made between tactical and strategic air interdiction, depending on the objectives of the operation. Typical objectives in tactical interdiction are meant to affect events rapidly and locally, for example through direct destruction of forces or supplies en route to the active battle area. By contrast, strategic objectives are often broader and more long-term, with fewer direct attacks on enemy fighting capabilities, instead focusing on infrastructure, logistics and other supportive assets.

Deep air support can be contrasted with close air support, highlighting the difference between their respective objectives. Close air support, as the name suggests, is directed towards targets close to friendly ground units, as closely coordinated air-strikes, in direct support of active engagement with the enemy. Deep air support or air interdiction is carried out further from the active fighting, based more on strategic planning and less directly coordinated with ground units. Despite being more strategic than close air support, air interdiction should not be confused with strategic bombing, which is unrelated to ground operations.

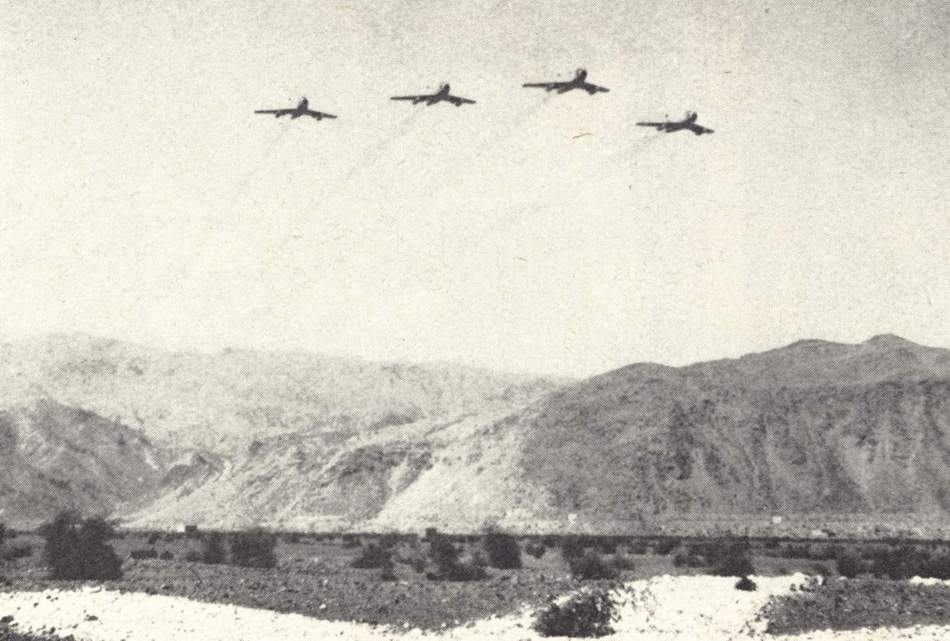
A 4-ship Vic formation of Pakistani F-86F Sabres returning from an interdiction mission during the 1965 war

Air interdiction can cause the physical destruction or attrition of soldiers and matériel before they can reach the battlefield, sever enemy's lines of communication, prevent soldiers and matériel from reaching the battlefield. It can create systemic inefficiencies in the enemy's logistic system so that soldiers and matériel arrive at the battlefield more slowly or in an uneconomical manner.

== History ==
=== World War II ===
In the lead up to the invasion of France, the Allied strategic bomber force was switched from the destruction of the enemy air force and means of production to a destruction of the railway routes to the intended landing areas. Once the landings were underway, the Allied tactical and strategic air forces were used to prevent the German strategic armoured reserves from being brought up to the coast and reinforce the divisions there.

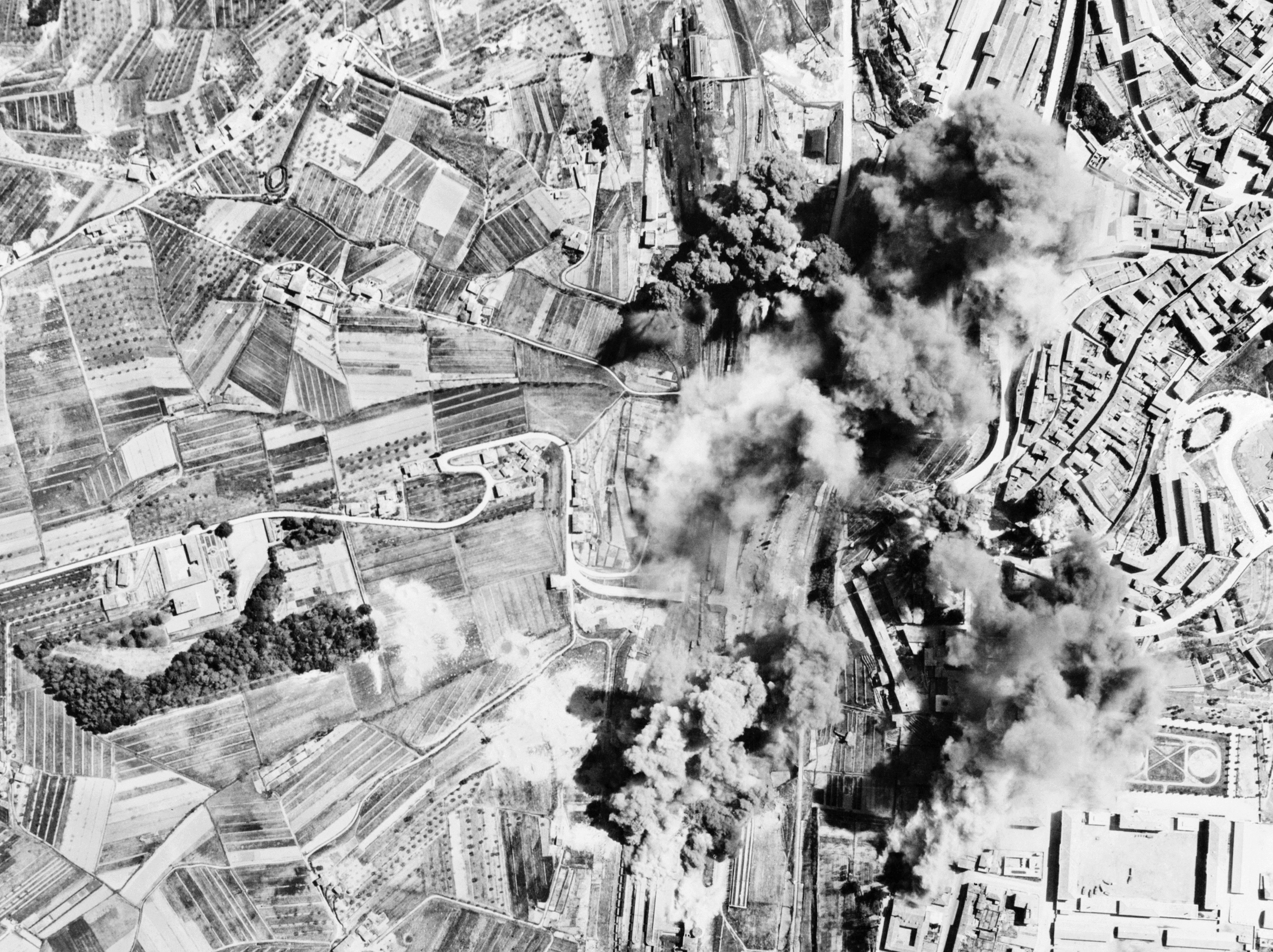
Aerial bombing of German railroad yards at Siena during Operation Strangle by Martin B-26 Marauder medium bombers on April 11 1944, On the alternate line from Pisa and Florence south to Rome, the Siena yards were bombed by Mediterranean Allied Air Force Bombers.

Operation Strangle was a series of air interdiction operations during the Italian Campaign of World War II by the Allied air forces to interdict German supply routes in Italy north of Rome from 19 March 1944 to 11 May 1944. Its aim was to prevent essential supplies from reaching German forces in Central Italy and compel a German withdrawal. The strategic goal of the air assault was to eliminate or greatly reduce the need for a ground assault on the region. The Allies failed in the overly ambitious objective of the campaign, namely the forced withdrawal of German forces from the Gustav Line, and did not curtail the flow of supplies. However, the air interdiction seriously complicated the German conduct of defensive operations and played a major role in the success of the subsequent Allied ground assault Operation Diadem.

Two principal interdiction lines were maintained across the narrow boot of Italy. This meant that no through trains were able to run from the Po Valley to the front line, and that south of Florence nearly all supplies had to be moved by truck. Over the course of eight weeks, the Allies flew 21,000 sorties (388 per day) and dropped 22,500 tonnes of bombs. The operation employed medium bombers and fighter bombers over a 150-square-mile (390 km^{2}) area from Rome to Pisa and from Pescara to Rimini.

=== Korean War ===
Operation Strangle was a sustained interdiction attack on North Korea's supplies and communications by the United Nations forces during the Korean War. Beginning in August 1951, the campaign's 87,552 interdiction sorties were credited with destroying 276 locomotives, 3,820 railroad cars, 19,000 rail cuts, and 34,211 other vehicles. The North Koreans countered the campaign by moving anti-aircraft (AA) guns and crews towards the front line and placing them in higher concentrations around important targets, causing heavy casualties in the UN forces. Despite high losses, Operation Strangle destroyed 900 AA gun positions and damaged 443.

By December 1951, North Korea was able to repair rail cuts in less than six hours, bridges in two to four days, and other bomb damages fairly quickly. By May 1952, it was apparent that their supply efforts had increased support to their front-line troops despite the air attacks. By June, half of the North's anti-aircraft guns—132 cannons and 708 automatic weapons—were posted along North Korea's railroads.

=== Cold War ===
During the Cold War, the NATO alliance leaned into the concept of air interdiction. "Air interdiction ... is essential to the overall effectiveness of the Allies' military forces. Their role in supporting operations, on land and at sea, will require appropriate long-distance airlift and air refuelling capabilities."

=== Vietnam War ===
Operation Commando Hunt was a covert U.S. Seventh Air Force and U.S. Navy Task Force 77 aerial interdiction campaign that took place during the Vietnam War. The operation began on 15 November 1968 and ended on 29 March 1972. The objective of the campaign was to prevent the transit of People's Army of Vietnam (PAVN) personnel and supplies on the logistical corridor known as the Ho Chi Minh Trail (the Truong Son Road to the North Vietnamese) that ran from southwestern North Vietnam through the southeastern portion of the Kingdom of Laos and into South Vietnam.

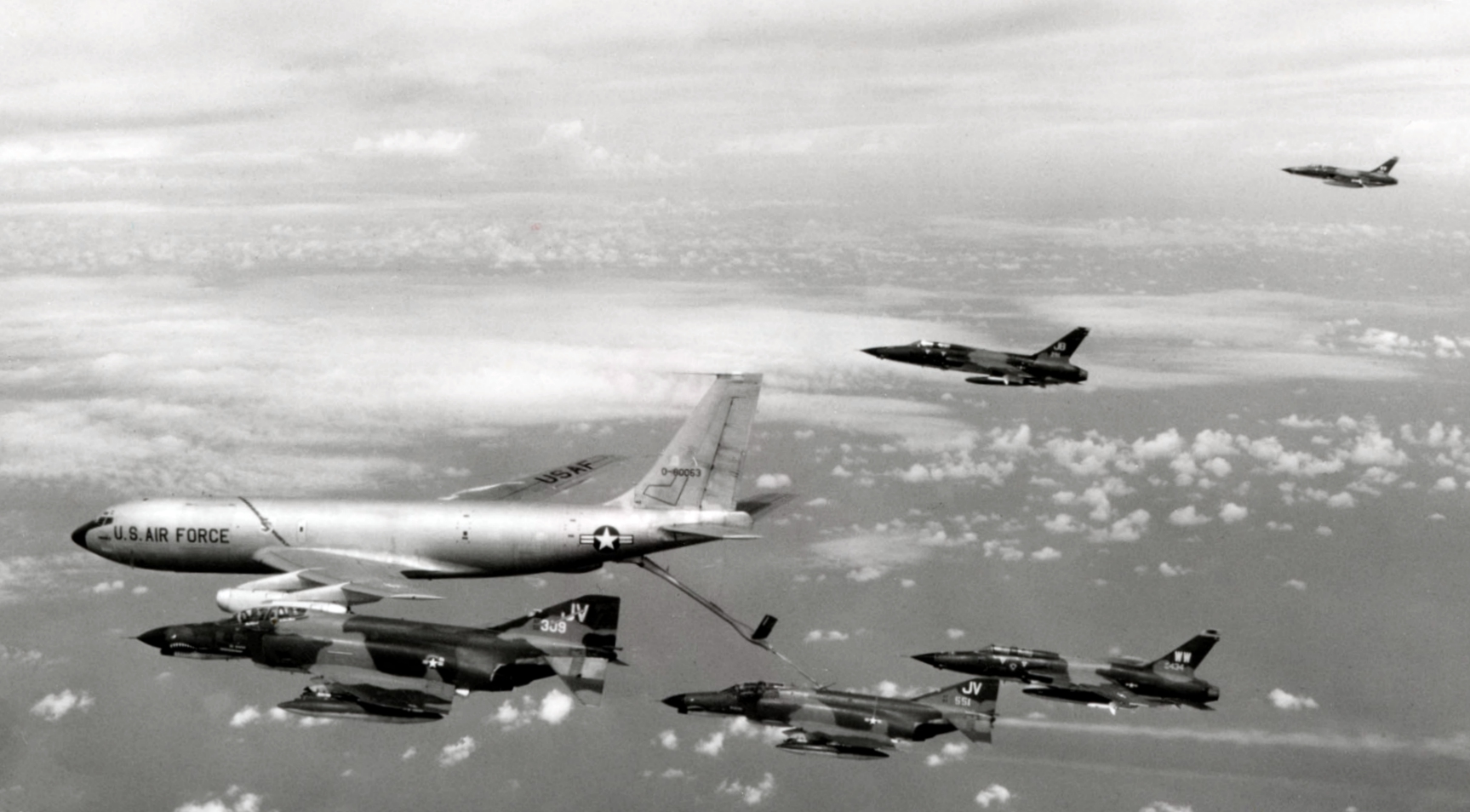
A 388th TFW SAM hunter-killer team refueling on its way to North Vietnam, October 1972

Operation Linebacker was the codename of a U.S. Seventh Air Force and U.S. Navy Task Force 77 air interdiction campaign conducted against North Vietnam from 9 May to 23 October 1972, during the Vietnam War.

Its purpose was to halt or slow the transportation of supplies and materials for the Nguyen Hue Offensive (known in the West as the Easter Offensive), an invasion of the South Vietnam by the North Vietnamese People's Army of Vietnam (PAVN) that had been launched on 30 March. Linebacker was the first continuous bombing effort conducted against North Vietnam since the end of Operation Rolling Thunder in November 1968.

=== Iran–Iraq War ===
Both the Iranian Air Force (IIAF) and the Iraqi Air Force (IQAF) made concerted efforts during the early days of the Iran–Iraq War to interdict the other side. For both sides this largely amounted to engaging in armed reconnaissance and attacking targets of opportunity, with few attacks on pre-planned targets. The IIAF did have the advantage of having superior munitions and tactical reconnaissance—possessing a squadron of RF-4E Phantoms and pre-revolution targeting intelligence—but their efforts largely mirrored that of the IQAF.

The IQAF's interdiction efforts peaked during the first 45 days of the war, but later declined to more sporadic missions, increasing in conjunction with major offensives. Interdiction by the IIAF was more sustained through late 1980 but after mid-January 1981 also declined. While both sides caused considerable damage on the other, with the Iranians arguably achieving more, neither interdiction effort was particularly effective nor did they play a factor in the outcome of the war. Both sides pulled back their air forces to avoid mounting losses and with the reasoning that, while they might not play a role in winning the war, they could still be used to avoid defeat.

=== Gulf War, 1990–1991 ===
The third and largest phase of the air campaign targeted military targets throughout Iraq and Kuwait: Scud missile launchers, weapons research facilities, and naval forces. About one-third of the Coalition airpower was devoted to attacking Scuds, some of which were on trucks and therefore difficult to locate. Some U.S. and British special forces teams had been covertly inserted into western Iraq to aid in the search and destruction of Scuds. The lack of adequate terrain for concealment hindered their operations, and some of them were killed or captured, such as occurred with the widely publicised Bravo Two Zero patrol of the SAS.

== See also ==
- Blockade
- Ground attack aircraft
- Interdictor
- No-drive zone
- Schnellbomber

== Bibliography ==
- Frieser, Karl-Heinz; Schmider, Klaus; Schönherr, Klaus; Schreiber, Gerhard; Ungváry, Kristián; Wegner, Bernd (2007). Die Ostfront 1943/44 – Der Krieg im Osten und an den Nebenfronten [The Eastern Front 1943–1944: The War in the East and on the Neighbouring Fronts]. Das Deutsche Reich und der Zweite Weltkrieg [Germany and the Second World War] (in German). Vol. VIII. München: Deutsche Verlags-Anstalt. ISBN 9783421062352.
- Mark, Eduard (1995). Aerial Interdiction: Air Power and the Land Battle in Three American Wars. DIANE Publishing Company. ISBN 9780788119668.
- Chun, Clayton (2001). Aerospace Power in the Twenty-First Century: A Basic Primer. Air Force Academy Colorado Sprints. ISBN 9781428990296.
- Bergquist, Ronald E. (1988). The Role of Airpower in the Iran-Iraq War. Air University Press.
- Sallagar, F M (February 1972), Operation 'Strangle', (Italy, Spring 1944): A Case Study of Tactical Air Interdiction (PDF), The Rand Corporation
