= Spice (bomb) =

Israeli precision-guided bomb kit

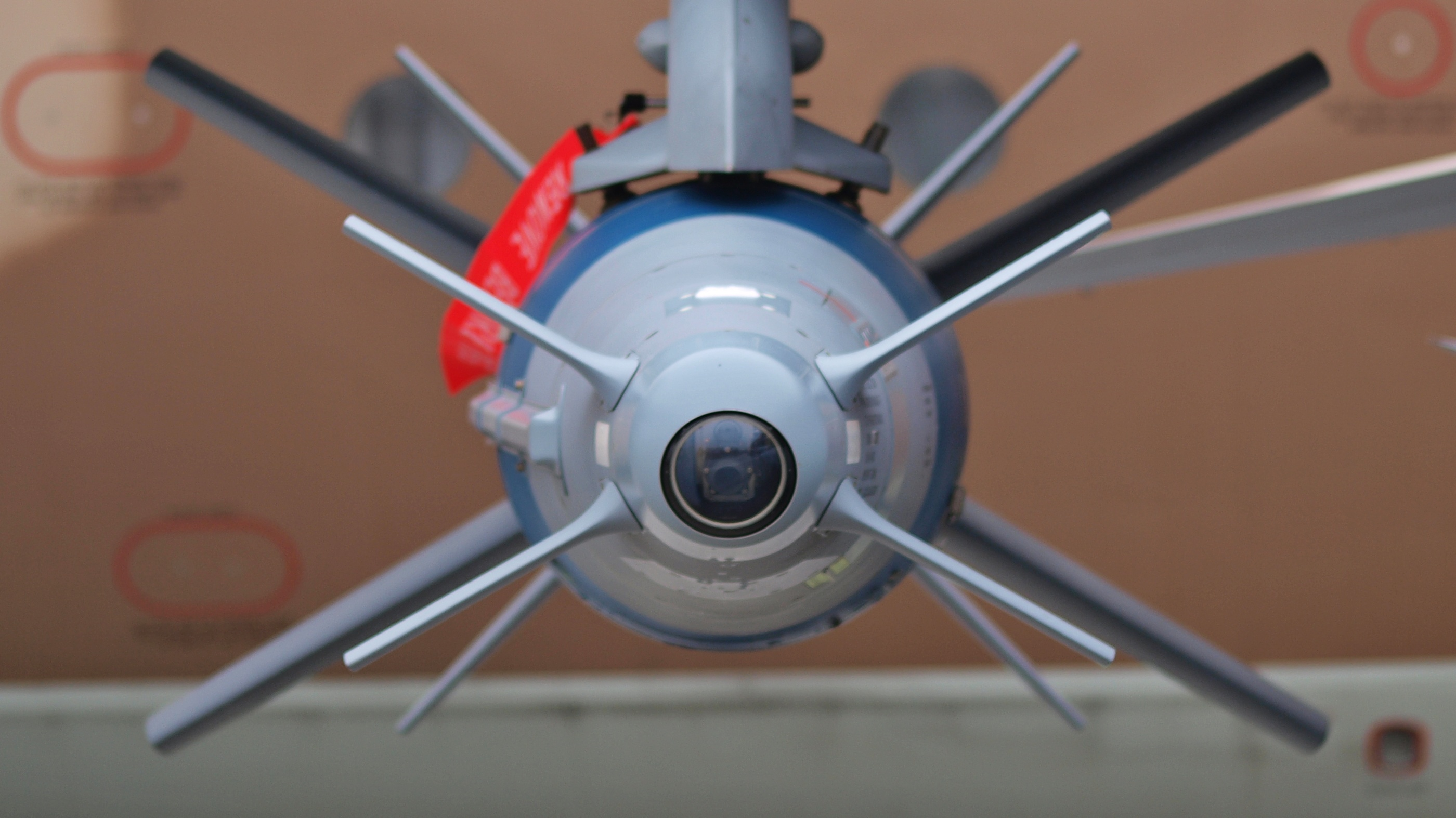
- Close-up front view of a Spice-guided bomb
- Type: Guided bomb
- Place of origin: Israel

Service history
- In service: 2003
- Used by: Israeli Air Force; Indian Air Force; Hellenic Air Force

Production history
- Manufacturer: Rafael Advanced Defense Systems; Kalyani Rafael Advanced Systems

Specifications
- Mass: 453 kg, 907 kg, or 113 kg (1000, 2000, or 250 pounds)
- Warhead: Mk. 83 or Mk. 84 warheads
- Accuracy: 3 m CEP
- Launch platform: F-15, F-16, Panavia Tornado, Gripen, Mirage 2000, Sukhoi-30 MKI, Tejas Mk2

The "SPICE" ("Smart, Precise Impact, Cost-Effective") is an Israeli-developed, EO/GPS- guidance kit used for converting air-droppable unguided bombs into precision-guided bombs.

The featured guidance system is a derivative of the respective system used in the "Popeye" (AGM-142 Have Nap) air-to-surface missile. The "Spice" family of guided bombs are a product of an Israeli company Rafael Advanced Defense Systems. It achieved initial operational capability in 2003, in Israeli Air Force F-16 squadrons.

== Design ==
The "Spice" guided bomb features technology not typically seen in most EO-guided bombs, such as the GBU-15. It combines the advantages of satellite guidance, allowing it to engage camouflaged and hidden targets, to provide a "drop-and-forget" option for several such targets simultaneously and operate in all weather and lighting conditions, and those of electro-optical guidance, such as the ability to provide "man-in-the-loop" guidance for higher precision.

It has the ability to engage relocatable targets, a lower CEP than that of satellite-guided munitions, and independence from external information sources like satellites into one bomb – reducing the number of munitions, and hence, payload that an aircraft has to carry for a given strike mission, increasing its combat radius and maneuverability.

This multiple guidance methods selectability is especially useful in an "information warfare" battlefield, where an aircraft might approach a surface target while it is, for example, masked with smoke, in which case satellite guidance would be required, or moving around, in which case electro-optical guidance would be required.

The "Spice" kit can be fitted with up to 100 targets pre-flight that can be accessed and selected in-flight.

Since it has a total of 12 control surfaces in 3 groups (fore, mid-body, and tail), the "Spice" has a glide range of about 60 kilometers. This allows a striking aircraft to release a bomb at a target without entering the threat envelope of most short- and medium-range air defense systems which offers it some protection. This is achieved while saving the higher costs associated with propelled munitions.

== Operational history ==
In February 2019, the Indian Air Force stated that its Mirage 2000s targeted a Jaish-e-Mohammed militant training camp near the town of Balakot in Khyber Pakhtunkhwa province in Pakistan using SPICE 2000 munitions.

During the 2021 Israel–Palestine crisis, the Israeli Air Force used Spice bombs against Al-Sharouk Tower in Gaza. The attack destroyed two residential buildings, killing 6 Palestinian civilians and one Syrian.

During the Israel–Hezbollah conflict (2023–present), the Israeli military leveled a suburban Beirut building that it said housed Hezbollah facilities. The Spice 2000 bomb used in the attack was photographed mid-air by Bilal Hussein (photojournalist) instants before it hit the building.

Spice bombs were used by Israel in combat in the 2026 Iran war.

== Operation ==
An unguided bomb fitted with a Spice kit can contain up to 100 images of its potential targets.

The bomb is then loaded on a strike aircraft. In the pylon to which the bomb is attached, there is a data link between the aircraft's cockpit and the bomb.

As the aircraft flies in the air and approaches a target, either the weapon systems officer (WSO – the back seater in such aircraft as the F-15E Strike Eagle or F-16I Sufa) or the pilot (in single-seat aircraft) can use the TV/IR display in the cockpit to see the image the bomb sends to them. Once they have selected one of the preprogrammed targets or manually fed the bomb with a target, by feeding it with either an image or geographical coordinates to home on, the bomb is ready for release into a guided trajectory.

Once the bomb is released, it begins searching for its target to acquire it and home in on it. This can be done in several ways:

First, there is pure CCD or IR for low lighting conditions image matching, when the guidance section uses algorithms to match the target image in its memory with the image provided by the seeker and align the center of the seeker's FOV with the desired image, a guidance method known as DSMAC.

Second, if the CCD/IR seeker cannot acquire its target for any reason, such as visual obstructions, the bomb can automatically switch to GPS/INS guidance. This means that the bomb aspires to bring itself to the target's altitude at a known geographical location. The bomb receives data on its current location from GPS satellites, or from an inertial navigation system in the bomb itself, that has been fed, through the pylon datalink, with the dropping aircraft's coordinates a fraction of a second before the drop and can therefore calculate its coordinates from the dropping time and on.

Third, there is a manual "man-in-the-loop" guidance option, in which the WSO looks at a backseat TV display to see the seeker's view, sent to them through an RF command guidance datalink, and uses the backseat stick to control the bomb to the target. With a skilled WSO that has a "sensitive hand", this guidance method is potentially the most accurate one employed today for air-dropped munitions and has no measurable miss distance. Its main drawback is that it allows for only one bomb to be guided at a time.

== Variants ==
- Spice 1000 : An add-on kit for 450 kg (1000 lb) warheads such as the MK-83, MPR1000, BLU-110, RAP-1000 and others. The weapon has deployable wings similar to the JDAM Extended Range, the JSOW and the SDB that substantially increase its range to 100 km (54 nmi; 62 mi) and facilitate the integration to light fighter aircraft.
- Spice 2000 : An add-on kit for 900 kg (2000 lb) warheads such as the MK-84, BLU-109, RAP-2000 and others. These bombs were used by IAF's Mirage 2000 at Balakot in Pakistan. It has a range of 60 km (32 nmi; 37 mi)
- Spice 250 : A 113 kg (249 lb) glide bomb designed as a complete system rather than an add-on kit, with a stand-off range of 100 km (54 nmi; 62 mi).
- Spice 250 ER : This new variant incorporates a micro-turbojet engine with an internal JP-8/10 fuel tank to deliver over the range of 150 km (81 nmi; 93 mi).

== Operators ==
- Brazil
- Colombia
- Greece
- India: The Defence Acquisition Council (DAC) of India, cleared the procurement of over 300–1,000 additional SPICE-1000 munitions for the Indian Air Force on 29 December 2025 at a cost of $8.7 billion.
- Israel
- Singapore
- South Korea

== Specifications ==
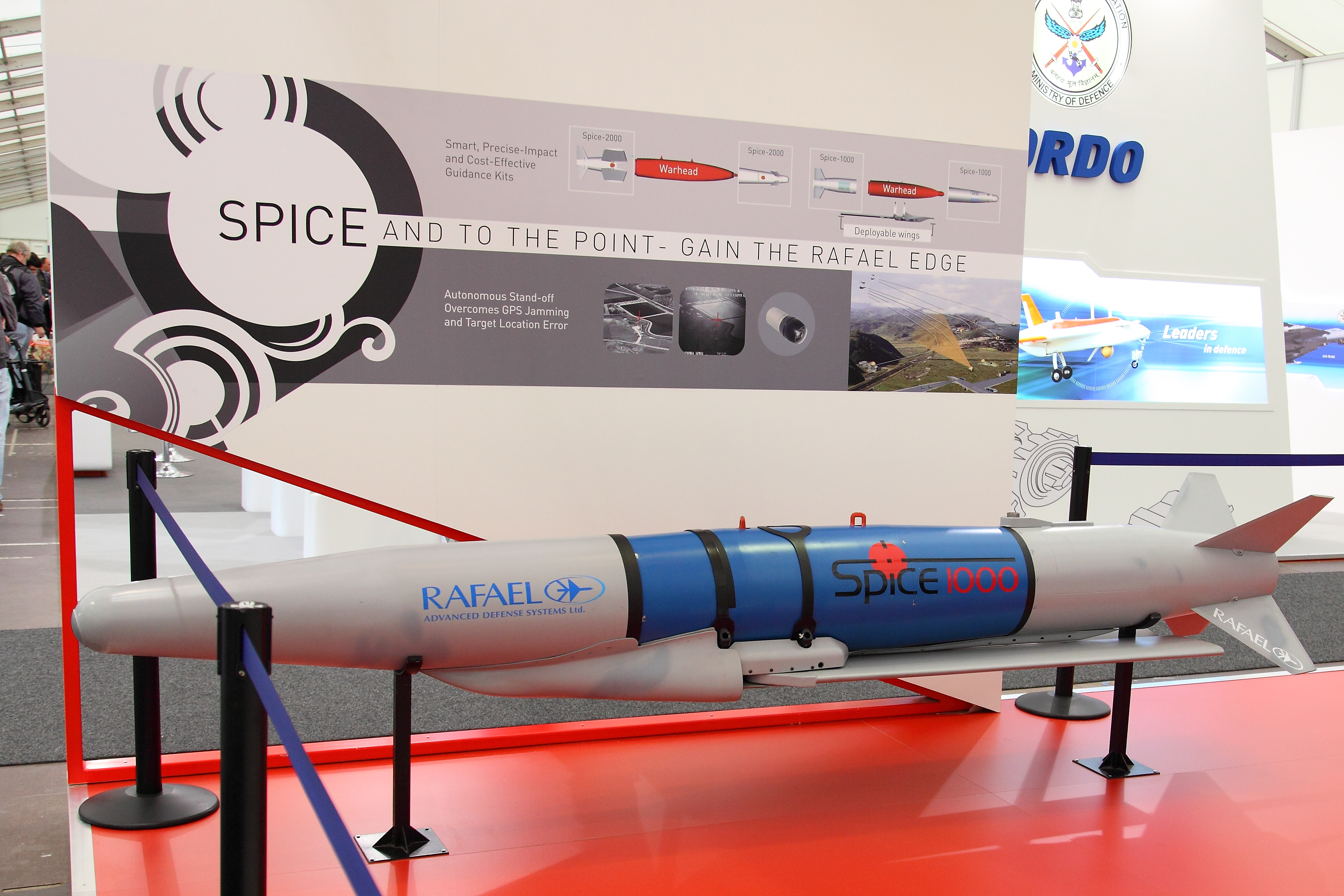
Spice-1000

- Warhead : Mk. 83 (1,000 lb (450 kg)) or Mk. 84 (2,000 lb (910 kg))
- Circular error probability : 3 m (9.8 ft)
- Guidance system : CCD/Infrared homing with GPS/INS
- Carrying-capable aircraft : F-15, F-16, Mirage 2000, Tornado, FA-50, F-35

== See also ==
- JDAM Extended Range – (United States)
- GBU-39 Small Diameter Bomb – (United States)
- MLGB – (Israel)
- MSOV – (Israel)
- H-4 SOW – (Pakistan)
- GBU-53/B StormBreaker – (United States)
- AGM-154 Joint Standoff Weapon – (United States)
- AASM – (France)
- HGK – (Turkey)
- KGGB – (South Korea)
- FT PGB – (China)
- LS PGB – (China)
- LT PGB – (China)
- Umbani – (South Africa)
