= Sky Sting =

Israeli air-to-air missile

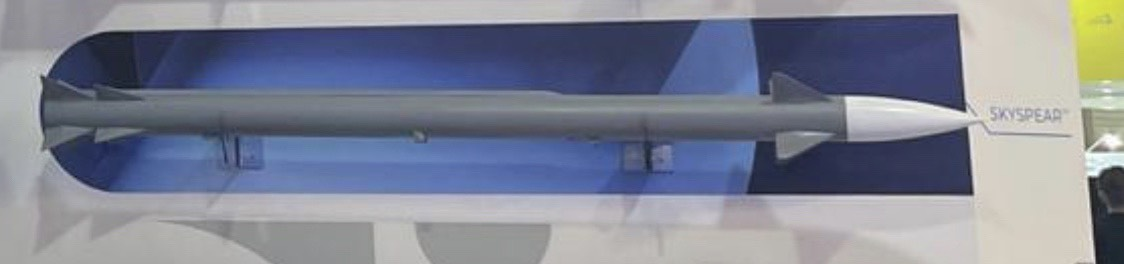
- Sky Sting missile at Paris Air Show, 2023
- Type: Beyond-visual-range air-to-air missile
- Place of origin: Israel

Production history
- Designer: Rafael Advanced Defense Systems

Specifications
- Mass: 170 kg (370 lb) est.
- Length: 3.7 m (12 ft 2 in) est.
- Diameter: 180 mm (7.1 in) est.
- Warhead: HE
- Detonation mechanism: Proximity / impact fuze
- Propellant: Three-pulse solid-propellant rocket motor
- Operational range: 250 km (160 mi; 130 nmi) est.
- Maximum speed: Mach 5+
- Guidance system: INS, two-way datalink, RF
- References: Janes

Sky Sting, formerly known as Sky Spear, is a long-range, beyond-visual-range air-to-air missile developed by Rafael. It was unveiled at the Paris Air Show in 2023.

== Description ==
The missile is powered by a three-pulse rocket motor, which allows it to engage targets at extreme ranges of up to 250km, surpassing PL-15.

One of the missile's standout features is its advanced radio frequency (RF) seeker, outfitted with modern Electronic Counter-Countermeasures (ECCM). This ensures early and precise target acquisition even under heavy electromagnetic interference or in contested electronic warfare environments.

== Potential operators ==
India

- Indian Air Force: Rafael has offered the Sky Sting missile for use on Indian Sukhoi Su-30MKIs and HAL Tejas Mk1As.

Israel

- Israeli Air Force: Potential use on Israeli F-15s, F-16s and F-35Is.

Greece

- Hellenic Air Force: Potential use on Greek F-16Vs and F-35s.

== See also ==
- List of munitions used by the Israeli Air Force
- Indian Air Force
- MBDA Meteor – (France, United Kingdom, Italy, Germany, Spain, Sweden)
- PL-15 – (China)
- AIM-120D – (United States)
- R-77M – (Russia)
- Astra Mk2 – (India)
