= MSOV =

Israeli glide bomb

MSOV (Modular Stand-Off Vehicle) is a modular stand-off glide bomb with a range of up to 100 km (55 nm), manufactured by Israel Military Industries (IMI). Length is 3.97 m long and has a wingspan of 2.7 m. The weight of the vehicle, including the 675kg modular unitary warhead payload, is 1,050 kg. Guidance is via GPS. The wings unfold after the weapon is released from the aircraft. Two MSOVs can be carried by an F-16I.

== See also ==
- MLGB – (Israel)
- Armement Air-Sol Modulaire – (France) (AASM)
- FT PGB – (China)
- LS PGB – (China)
- LT PGB – (China)
- Joint Direct Attack Munition – (United States) (JDAM)
- HGK – (Turkey)
- Denel Dynamics Umbani – (South Africa)
- KGGB – (South Korea)
- JSOW – (United States)
