= MLGB =

MLGB (Medium-weight Laser Guided Bomb)
- Type: Bomb
- Place of origin: Israel

Service history
- In service: 2013–present
- Used by: Israel

Production history
- Designed: 2011

Specifications
- Mass: 250 lb (113 kg)
- Length: 170cm
- Warhead: 92 kg
- Guidance system: laser guidance and GPS
- Accuracy: 10m CEP with GPS, 1 m CEP with laser
- Launch platform: F-16

MLGB (Medium-weight Laser Guided Bomb) is a 250-pound (110 kg) precision guided glide bomb that can attack both fixed and moving targets. It was developed by Israel Aerospace Industries (IAI). The relatively light warhead is optimized for such missions where minimum collateral damage is of high importance.

== See also ==
- Small Diameter Bomb – (United States)
- GBU-53/B – (United States)
- AGM-154 Joint Standoff Weapon – (United States)
- Spice (bomb) – (Israel)
- MSOV – (Israel)
