= Python (missile) =

Israeli short-range air-to-air missile

Rafael PYTHON
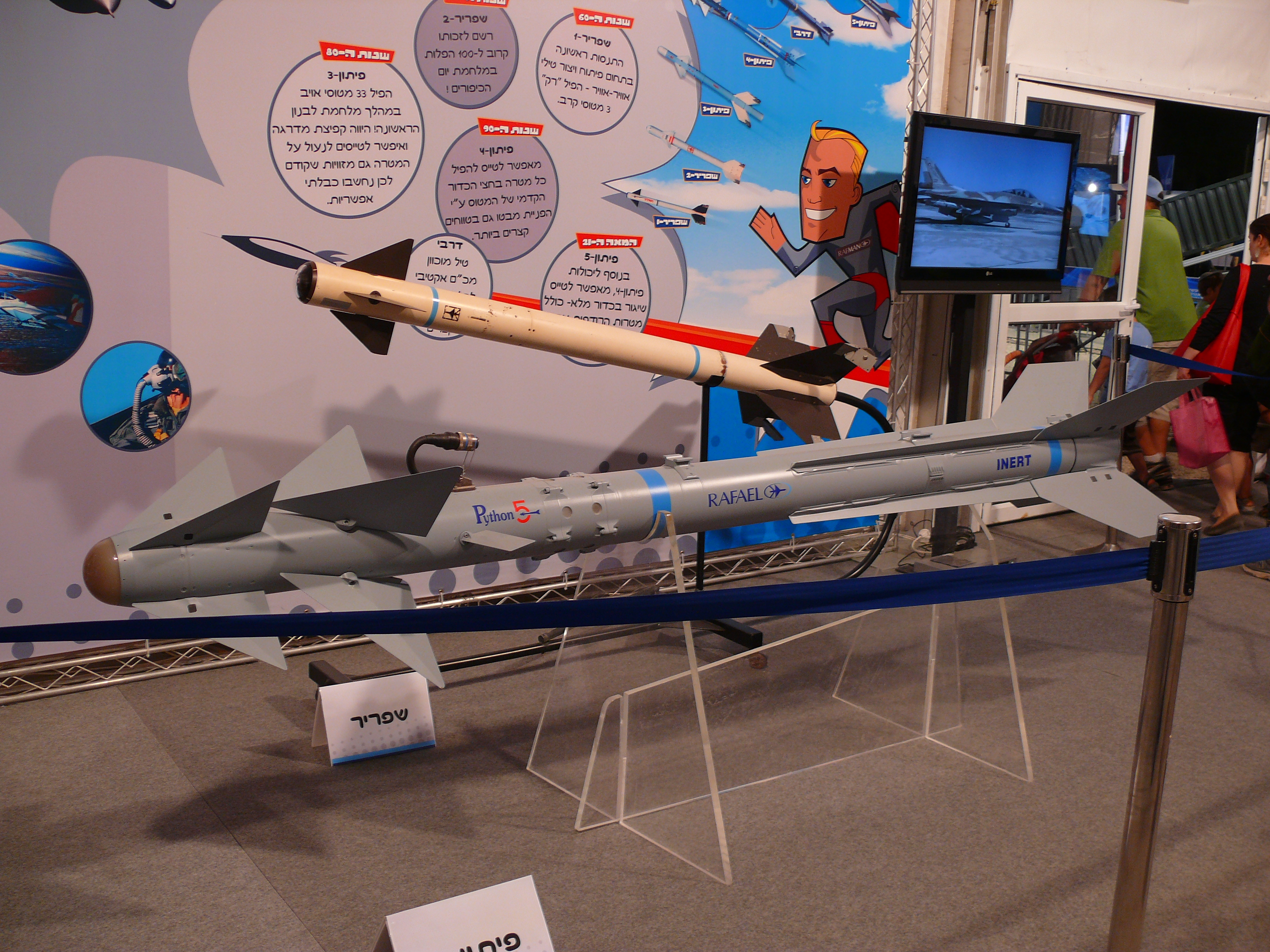
- The newest and the oldest member of the Python family of AAM for comparisons, Python-5 (displayed lower-front) and Shafrir-1 (upper-back).
- Type: Short-range air-to-air missile
- Place of origin: Israel

Service history
- Used by: See operators
- Wars: Yom Kippur War; Falklands War; 1982 Lebanon War; 2006 Lebanon War

Production history
- Manufacturer: Rafael Advanced Defense Systems
- Unit cost: Shafrir series: Shafrir-1: US$20,000
- Produced: Shafrir series: 1961–1983; Python series: 1980–present

Specifications
- Mass: 103.6 kilograms (228 pounds 6 ounces)
- Length: 3.1 metres (10 feet)
- Diameter: 160 millimetres (6.3 inches)
- Wingspan: 640 mm (25 in)
- Warhead: 11 kg (24 lb 4 oz)
- Detonation mechanism: proximity
- Engine: solid fuel rocket motor
- Operational range: >20 kilometres (12 miles)
- Flight altitude: N/A
- Maximum speed: Mach 4
- Guidance system: infrared homing + 320×240 pixel dual waveband electro-optical imaging seeker, lock on after launch, with infrared counter-counter-measures (IRCCM)
- Launch platform: Aircraft: BAE Sea Harrier; CASA C-101 Aviojet; F-4E Kurnass 2000; F-5E/F Tiger-II; McDonnell Douglas F-15 Eagle; General Dynamics F-16 Fighting Falcon; Dassault Mirage III; Dassault Mirage 5 Dassault Mirage 2000; Eurofighter Typhoon; IAI Nesher/Dagger/Finder; IAI Kfir; HAL Tejas; KAI T-50 Golden Eagle; Leonardo M-346FA Master; Saab JAS 39 Gripen; Sukhoi Su-30MKI; Su-25KM Scorpion

The Rafael Python (stylized all uppercase; פיתון) is a family of air-to-air missiles (AAMs) built by the Israeli weapons manufacturer Rafael Advanced Defense Systems, formerly RAFAEL Armament Development Authority. Originally starting with the Shafrir (Hebrew: שפריר, loosely translated as a dome, or a protective cloak – but also similar sounding to Dragonfly, a male form of inflection for Damselfly (שפירית)) series, the Shafrir-1 missile was developed in 1959, followed by the Shafrir-2 in early 1970s. Subsequently, the missiles were given the western name of "Python" by the parent company for export purposes, starting with the Python-3 in 1978. Since then, it has been further developed and evolved into the Python-4, Python-5, Derby and also, the SPYDER, an advanced ground-based air-defence system. Currently, the missiles are in service with the armed forces of over fifteen countries from around the world.

== Design and development ==
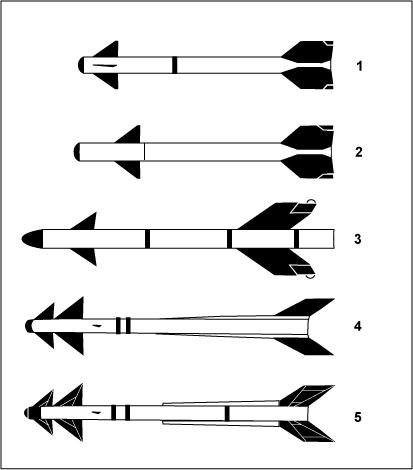
Listed from top to bottom: Shafrir-1, Shafrir-2, Python-3, Python-4, Python-5.

In the 1950s, the Israeli Air Force (IAF) submitted requirements for a domestically made air-to-air missile, to promote domestic defense industry and reduce reliance on imports. Rafael Armament Development Authority was contracted to develop the Shafrir (Hebrew: שפריר, loosely translated as Dragonfly, a male form of inflection for Damselfly, שפרירית) in 1959. The missile entered operational status with Israeli Mirage jets in 1963, but the IAF was unhappy with its performance and no air combat kills were achieved with it during the Six-Day War, kills being made with guns instead. The improved Shafrir-2 was soon introduced in 1971, and it proved to be one of the most successful air-to-air missiles ever made. During the 1973 Yom Kippur War, the IAF launched 176 Shafrir-2 missiles, destroying 89 enemy aircraft. The Shafrir-2 was exported along with Israeli-made aircraft to South American countries.

After the Shafrir-2, the new missiles made by Rafael were given the western name of Python. This is why the next missile built by Rafael in early 1970s was named Python-3, but there is no Python-1 or Python-2 (they were Shafrir-1, Shafrir-2). The Python-3 has improved range and all-aspect attack ability, it proved itself before and during the 1982 Lebanon War, destroying 35 enemy aircraft. The People's Republic of China was impressed with its performance and license-built the Python-3 as the PiLi-8 (PL-8) AAM.

Further improvements to the Python-3 led to the development of Python-4 in mid-1980s, which added the option for helmet-sight guidance. In the 1990s Rafael started development on the Python-5 AAM, which was equipped with an advanced electro-optical imaging seeker with lock-on after-launch ability. The new missile was show-cased in 2003 Paris Air Show, and intended for service with IAF the F-15I Ra'am ("Thunder") and the F-16I Sufa ("Storm").

The Python-5 is said to have full sphere launch ability or is an all-aspect missile, meaning it can be launched at a target regardless of the target's location relative to the direction of the launching aircraft. It can lock onto targets after launch, even when they are up to 100 degrees off the boresight of the launching aircraft.

== Variants ==
=== Shafrir-1 ===
The Shafrir-1 was developed in 1959–1964 to fulfill IAF's requirement for a domestic air-to-air missile. It was intended to build the domestic defense industry's abilities, and reduce reliance on foreign imports. The fear of foreign dependence was later proven when France banned arms export to Israel.

The Shafrir-1 was intended for use on French-built Mirage III jets. The first testing took place in France in 1963. However the missile's performance was so poor that work immediately started on the next improved version, the Shafrir-2.

- Length: 250 cm (98 in)
- Span: 55 cm (22 in)
- Diameter: 14 cm (5.5 in)
- Weight: 65 kg (143 lb)
- Guidance: IR
- Warhead: 11 kg (24 lb) blast explosive, later 30 kg (66 lb)
- Range: 5 km (3 mi)
- Speed: Mach 1.7

=== Shafrir-2 ===
The Shafrir-2 was credited with 89 kills in the 1973 Yom Kippur War. During its whole service life, it is credited with a total of 106 kills.

- Length: 250 cm (98 in)
- Span: 55 cm (22 in)
- Diameter: 15 cm (5.9 in)
- Weight: 93 kg (205 lb)
- Guidance: IR
- Warhead: 11 kg (24 lb)
- Range: 5 km (3 mi)
- Speed: Mach 2.1

=== Python-3 ===
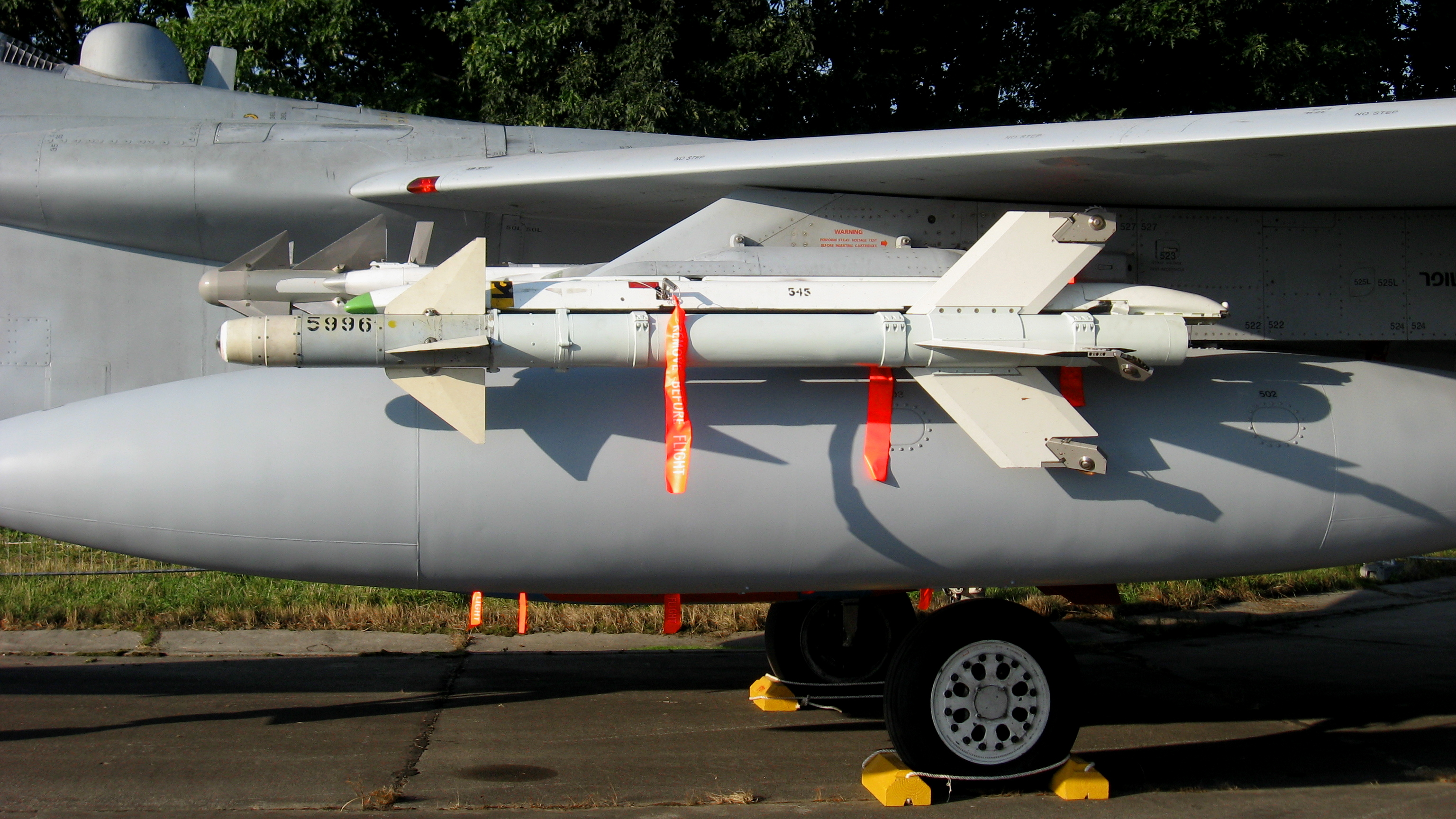
Python 3 missile under the wing of an Israeli F-15 Eagle.

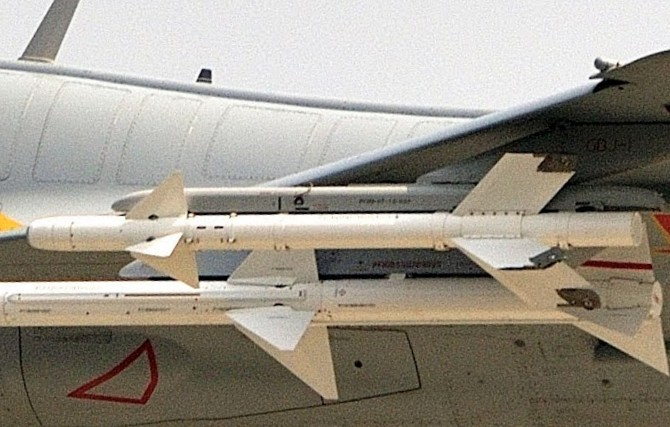
A PL-8, the Chinese license-built version of the Python 3, mounted under the wing of a Chengdu J-10A.

The Python-3 is a much-improved AAM with all-aspect attack ability, higher speed, range, and performance. It performed well before and during the 1982 Lebanon War, scoring 35 (other sources claim 50) kills.

China's PLAAF was quite impressed with this missile, and paid for licensed production as the PL-8 in the 1980s. The program code named "Number 8 Project" (八号工程) and formally started on September 15, 1983. From March 1988 to April 1989, technology transfer to China was complete while license assembly and license built parts continued, and by the spring of 1989, the complete domestic Chinese built missile received state certification. The major supplier of the missile was Xi'an Eastern Machinery Factory (西安东方机械厂) located at Xi'an, and China is also reported to have developed a helmet-mounted sight (HMS) system for the PL-8.

- Length: 295 cm (116 in)
- Span: 80 cm (31 in)
- Diameter: 16 cm (6.3 in)
- Weight: 120 kg (260 lb)
- Guidance: IR
- Warhead: 11 kg (24 lb), active proximity fuse
- Range: 15 km (9.3 mi)
- Speed: Mach 3.5

=== Python-4 ===
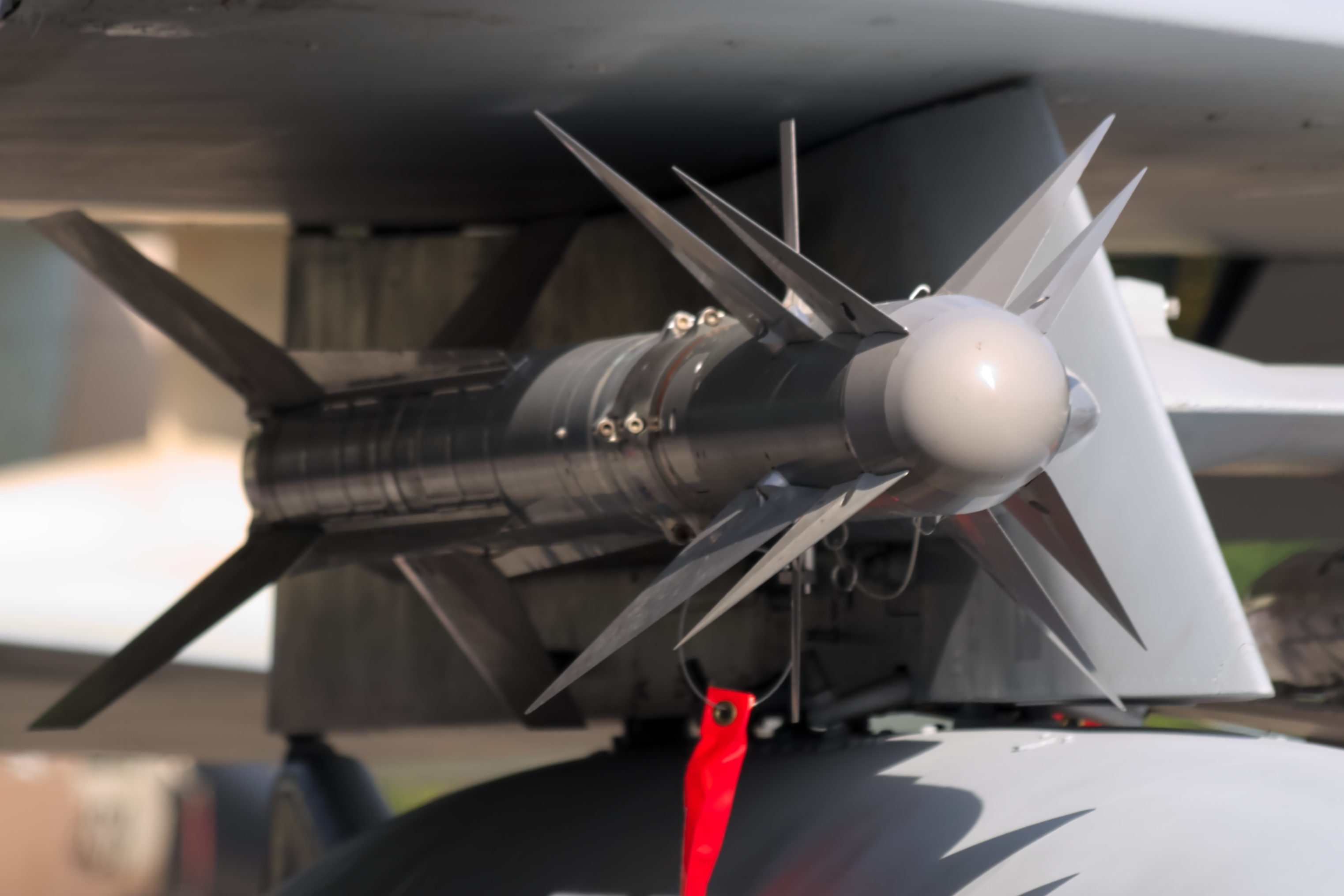
A Python 4 missile under the wing of F-15D Baz '957'

The Python-4 is a 4th generation AAM with all-aspect attack ability, and integration with a helmet-mounted sight (HMS) system. It entered service in the 1990s, and like its predecessor Python-3, it is integrated with the Elbit Systems DASH (Display And Sight Helmet) HMS system for Israeli F-15s and F-16s, Chilean F-16s (MLU and C/D block 50/52 plus), F-5E/F Tiger III, South American Kfirs and the SAAB JAS 39 Gripen. The missile's seeker is reported to use dual band technology array similar to that of US FIM-92 Stinger (infrared homing and ultraviolet), with IRCCM (Infrared Counter-Countermeasures) ability to reduce background IR radiation to reduce the effectiveness of enemy flares.

- Length: 300 cm (120 in)
- Span: 50 cm (20 in)
- Diameter: 16 cm (6.3 in)
- Weight: 120 kg (260 lb)
- Guidance: IR
- Warhead: 11 kg (24 lb), active laser proximity fuse with back-up impact fuse
- Range: 15 km (9.3 mi)
- Speed: Mach 3.5 or more

=== Python-5 ===
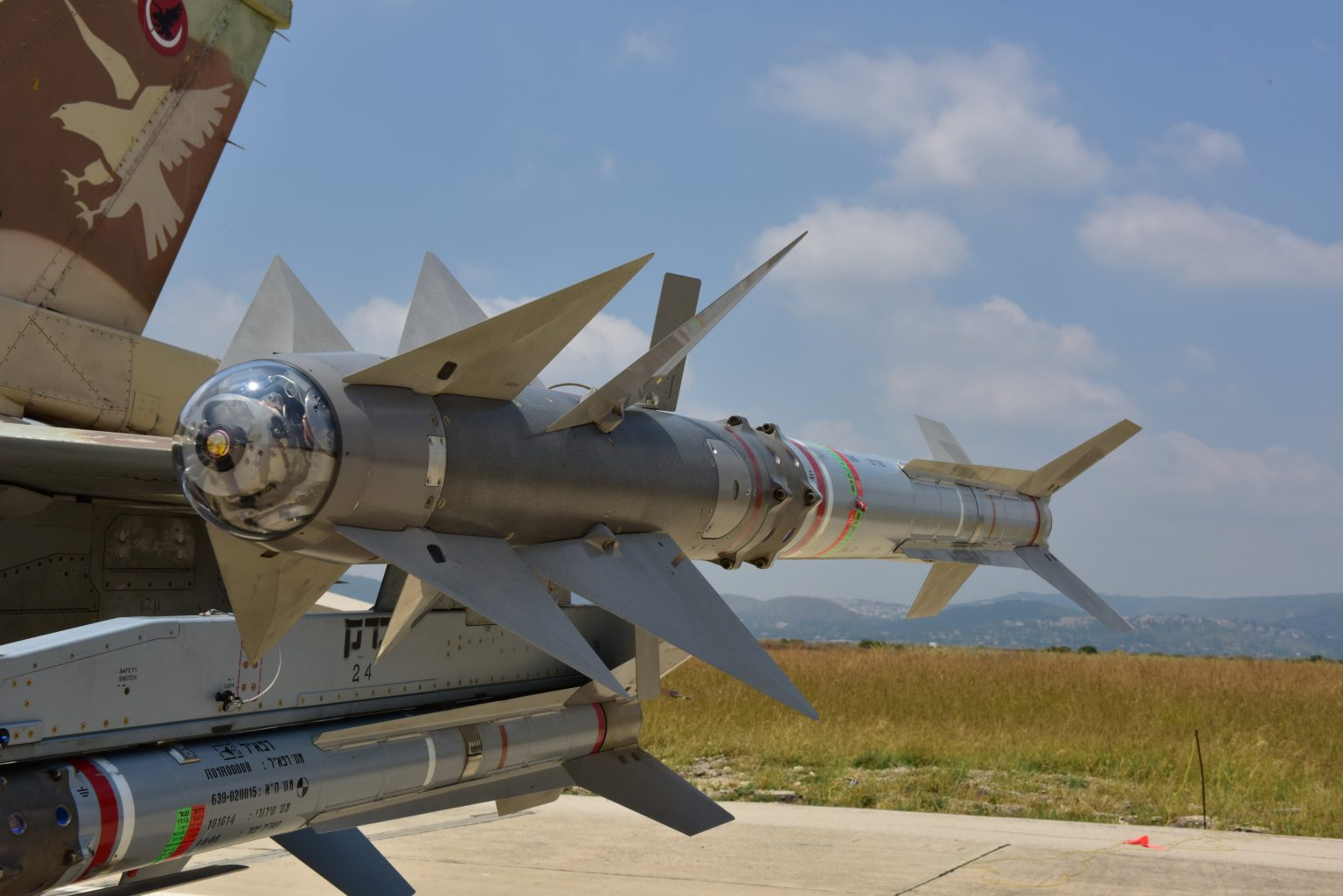
A Python-5, the latest member in the Python family of AAMs, mounted on an F-16D of 109 Squadron (Israel), August 2024

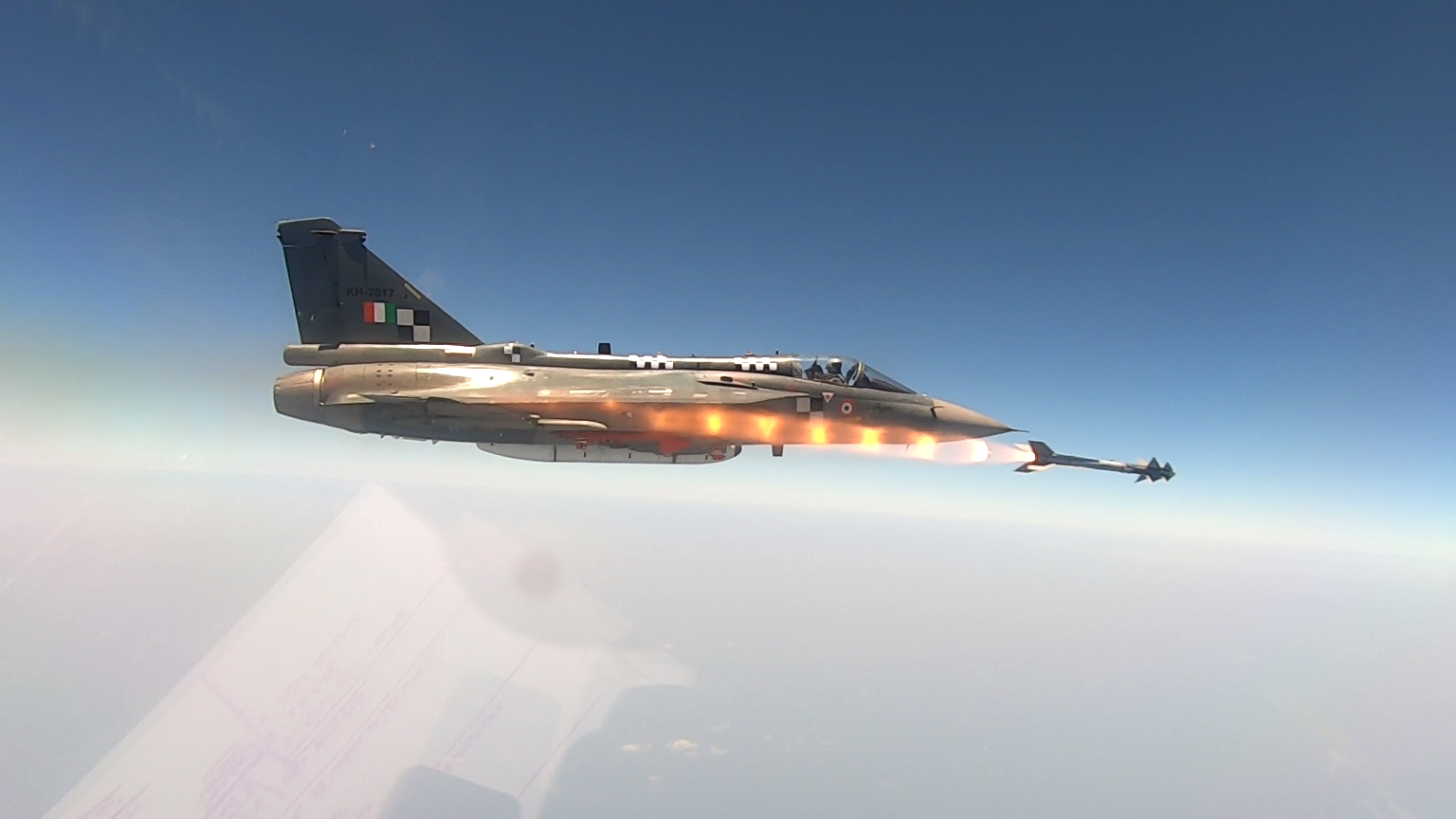
A Python-5 AAM being fired from Indian Air Force HAL Tejas fighter

The Python-5 is currently the most capable visual range air-to-air missile in Israel's inventory. As a short range air-to-air missile, it is capable of "lock-on after launch" (LOAL), and has full-sphere/all-direction (including rearward) attack ability. The missile features an advanced seeker head which includes an electro-optical and imaging infrared homing seeker which scans the target area for hostile aircraft, then locks-on for terminal chase, and a complex design utilizing a total of eighteen aerodynamic surfaces. The Python-5 was first used in combat during the 2006 Lebanon War, when it was used by F-16 Fighting Falcons to destroy two Iranian-made Ababil UAVs used by the Hezbollah. On 13 May 2021, an Israeli F-16 shot down a Hamas operated Shahed suicide drone with a Python-5 air-to-air missile.

- Length: 310 cm (120 in)
- Span: 64 cm (25 in)
- Diameter: 16 cm (6.3 in)
- Weight: 105 kg (231 lb)
- Guidance: IR + electro-optical imaging
- Warhead: 11 kg (24 lb)
- Range: > 20 km (12 mi)
- Speed: Mach 4

== Other Python developments ==
=== Derby ===
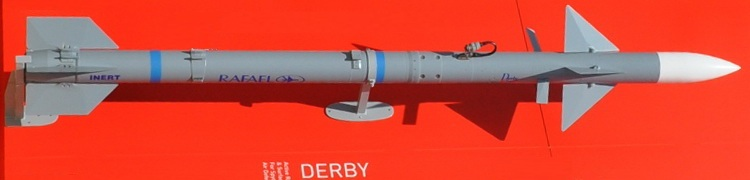
The Derby missile

Also known as the Alto, the Derby missile is a BVR, medium-range (~50 km (31 mi)) active radar homing missile. Though technically not part of the "Python" family, the missile is an enlarged version of the Python-4 with an active-radar seeker.

- Length: 362 cm (143 in)
- Span: 64 cm (25 in)
- Diameter: 16 cm (6.3 in)
- Weight: 118 kg (260 lb)
- Guidance: Active Radar
- Warhead: 23 kg (51 lb)
- Range: 50 km (31 mi)
- Speed: Mach 4

==== I-Derby ER ====
In June 2015, Rafael confirmed the existence of the I-Derby-ER, an extended range version of the Derby that increases range to 54 nmi (62 mi; 100 km), after a "Python 6" version based on an air-launched Stunner missile was abandoned. To achieve greater range, a dual-pulse solid rocket motor is added, where the secondary pulse of energy as the missile nears the target extends flight time. It also combines the seeker and fuse into an integrated sensor and fusing system to make room for the new motor.

In May 2019, it was reported that India was planning to arm its Sukhoi Su-30MKI fighters with I-Derby ER missiles to replace its R-77 missiles. Previously, in 2018, it had already been selected for the Indian Air Force's HAL Tejas fighter.

=== SPYDER ===
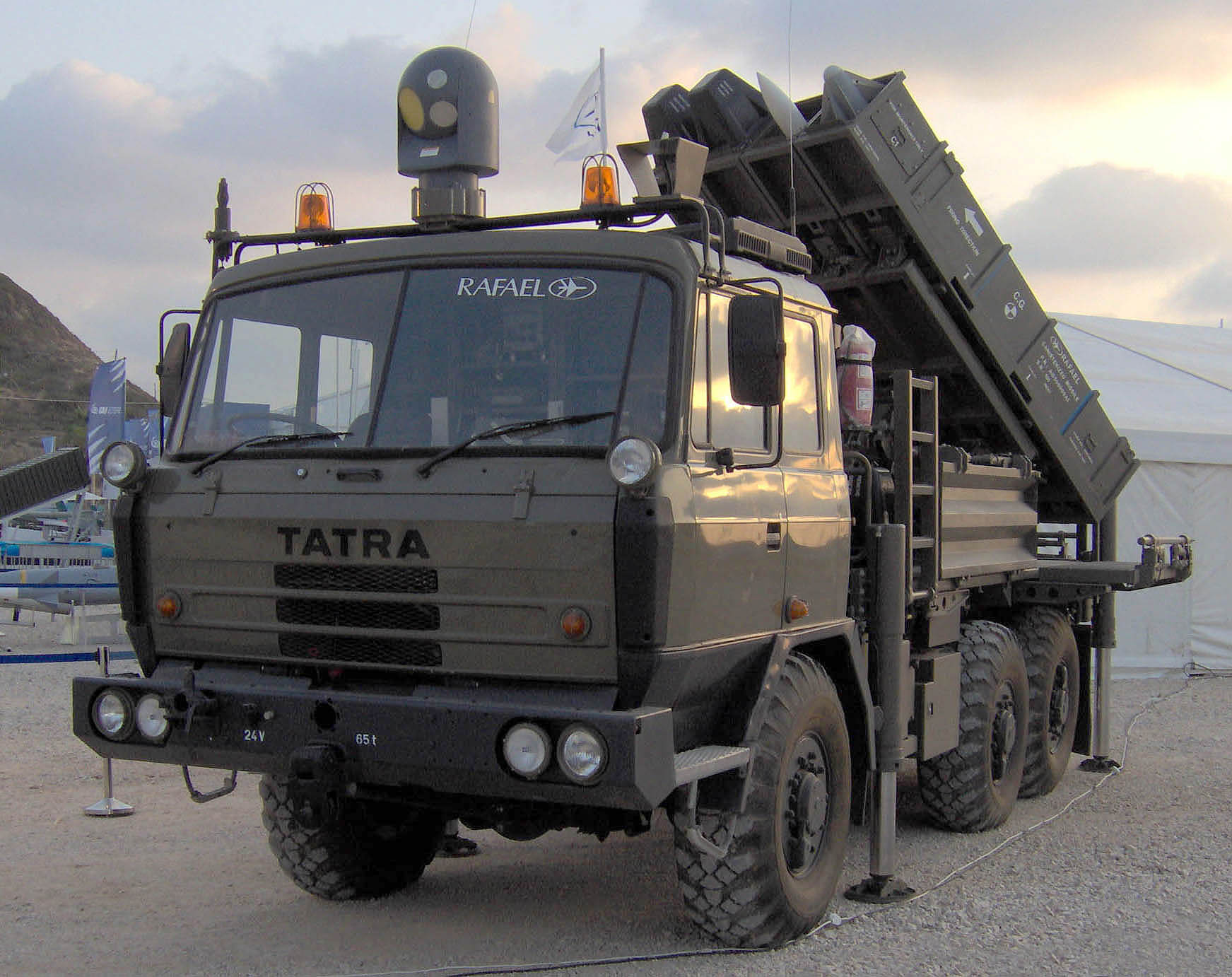
SPYDER—missile firing unit (MFU)

The SPYDER (Surface-to-air PYthon and DERby) is an advanced ground-based anti-aircraft missile system developed by Rafael that uses surface-to-air versions of the Python-5 and Derby missiles.

== Operators ==
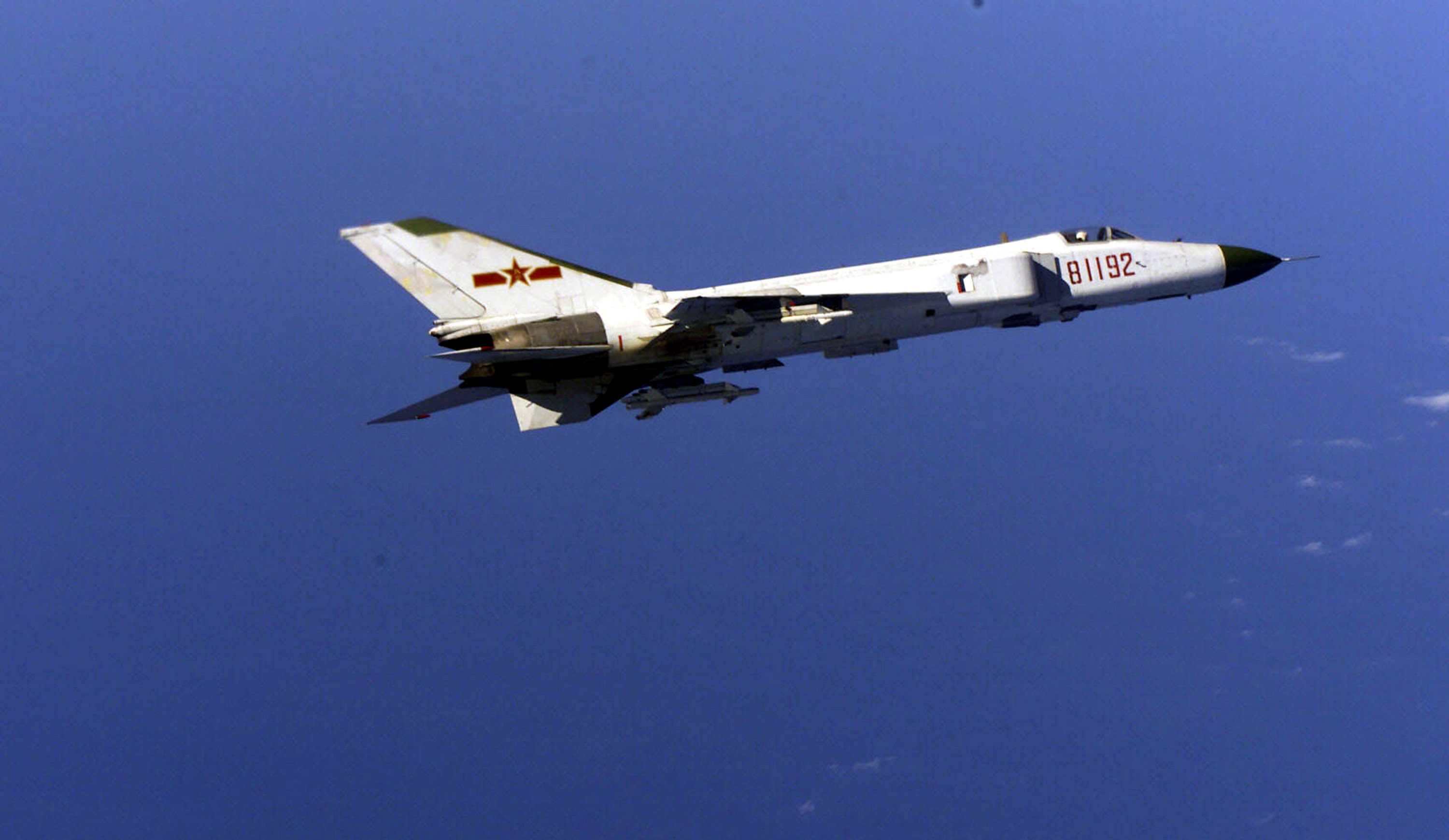
Two PL-8 AAMs are clearly visible on a Chinese Navy Shenyang J-8 interceptor

=== Current operators ===
- Argentina – Shafrir-2 (350 missiles, delivered 1981).
- Bolivia – Python-3.
- Brazil – Python-3 (400 missiles, delivered 2001), Python-4 and Derby (200 missiles each, all delivered 2011).
- Chile – Shafrir-2 (50 missiles, delivered 1978), Python-3 (120 missiles, delivered 1997), Python-4 (280 missiles, delivered 2011) and Derby (60 missiles, delivered 2003).
- China – Python-3 (3000 missiles, delivered 1983, local designation PiLi-8 (PL-8)).
- Colombia – Shafrir-2 (80 missiles, delivered 1989), Python-3/4 (75 missiles each, all delivered 2005), Python-5 (100 missiles, delivered 2011) and Derby (40 missiles, delivered 2010).
- Ecuador – Shafrir-2 (75 missiles, delivered 1984), Python-3/Python-4 (60 missiles, delivered 1996), Python-5 (50 missiles, delivered 2001) and Derby (60 missiles, delivered 2003).
- El Salvador – Shafrir.
- Georgia – Python-5 and Derby missiles delivered as part of SPYDER system.
- Honduras – Shafrir-2 (100 missiles, delivered 1978).
- India – Python-4 and Python-5 (100 missiles, delivered 2007) and I-Derby ER.
- Israel – Shafrir-1/2, Python-4 and Python-5, (primary user, local designation Zephyr).
- Philippines – Python-5 and Derby with solid rocket booster (part of SPYDER air defense system).
- Romania – Python-3.
- Singapore – Python-4 (600 missiles, delivered 2004) and Python-5 and Derby missiles. As of 2023, Python-V are used on RSAF F-16C/D+ fighters.
- Republic of China (Taiwan) – Shafrir-2 (450 missiles, delivered 1977).
- Thailand – Python-4 (400–500 missiles, delivered 1990).
- Venezuela – Python-4 (54 missiles, delivered 2004).
- Vietnam – Python-5 and Derby (375 missiles each, delivered 2018 as part of SPYDER system).

=== Former operators ===
- South Africa – Python-3 (local designation V3S Snake, delivered 1989 and retired in April 2008), Derby (Local designation as R-Darter or V4).

=== Future operators ===
- Czech Republic – I-Derby ER (48 missiles, delivered by 2027).

== See also ==
- List of munitions used by the Israeli Air Force
- AIM-9 Sidewinder – (United States)
- IRIS-T – (Germany, Italy, Sweden, Greece)
- Merlin – (Turkey) (Turkey)
- ASRAAM – (United Kingdom)
- R-73 – (Soviet Union)
