= GBU-53/B StormBreaker =

American precision-guided glide bomb

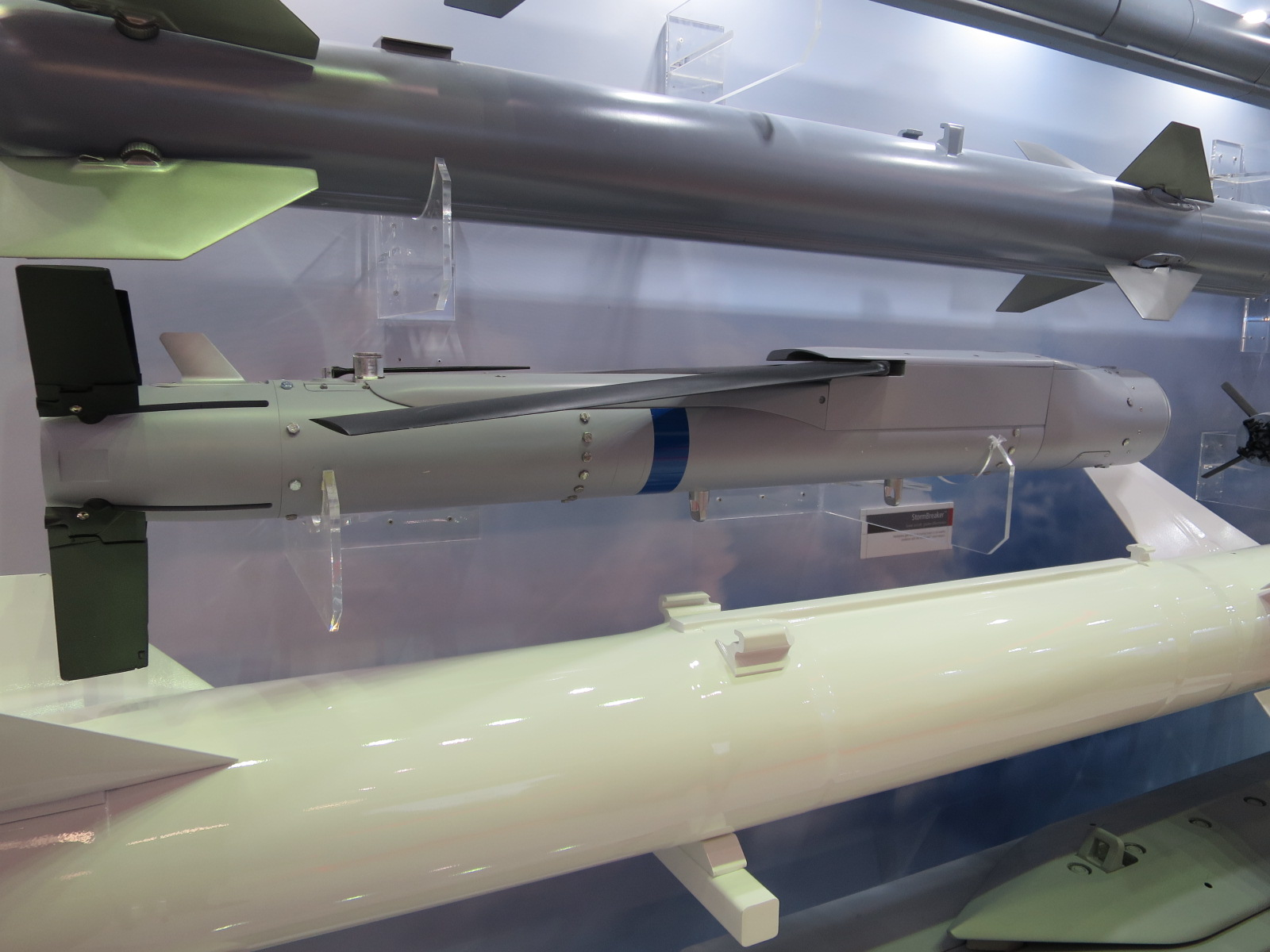
- Stormbreaker mockup at Dubai Air Show 2019
- Type: Glide bomb
- Place of origin: United States

Service history
- In service: September 2020 – present
- Used by: United States Air Force; United States Navy

Production history
- Designer: Raytheon Company
- Manufacturer: Raytheon Technologies
- Unit cost: US$195,000 (2021 Air Force); US$220,916 (2021 Navy); US$128,771(FY15); US$227,146 inc R&D (FY15)
- Produced: January 2014–present

Specifications
- Mass: 204 lb (93 kg)
- Length: 69 in (176 cm)
- Diameter: 6–7 in (15–18 cm)
- Warhead: 105 lb (48 kg)
- Operational range: 60 nmi (69 mi; 111 km), 40 nmi (46 mi; 74 km) against moving targets
- Guidance system: Millimeter wave Active radar homing / Semi-active laser guidance / Infrared homing (using an uncooled imaging infrared camera) / GPS coupled Inertial guidance / Data-link

The GBU-53/B StormBreaker, previously known as the Small Diameter Bomb II (SDB-II), is an American air-launched, precision-guided glide bomb.

Development was started in 2006 for a 250 pounds (113 kg) class bomb that can identify and strike mobile targets from standoff distances in all weather conditions. It is integrated on the F-15E Strike Eagle in 2020 and F/A-18 Super Hornet and will be integrated into the F-35 Lightning fighter. Its first flight was announced on May 1, 2009. A contract to start low rate initial production was awarded to Raytheon in June 2015.

The bomb is developed and manufactured by Raytheon. A Boeing/Lockheed Martin team attempted to develop it but lost in a U.S. Air Force competition. Boeing won the original competition but the project was on hold for several years due to a corruption scandal involving Darleen Druyun. The competition was reopened in September 2005.

== Operation ==
The bomb can use GPS/INS to guide itself into the general vicinity of a moving target during the initial search phase, with course correction updates provided using a Link 16 over UHF data link. The bomb has three modes of target acquisition: millimeter-wave radar, infrared homing using an uncooled imaging seeker, and semi-active laser homing. The weapon is capable of fusing the information from the sensors to classify the target and can prioritize certain types of targets as desired when used in semi-autonomous mode.

The shaped charge warhead in the bomb has both blast and fragmentation effects, which makes it effective against infantry, armor (including MBTs), unhardened structures and buildings, as well as patrol craft sized boats and other soft targets. The bomb would be the first purpose-built no-drive zone enforcement weapon.

The use of uncooled imaging infrared has been cited as innovative and effective in reducing costs. An important feature of the new weapon is maximizing the number of bombs carried by the strike aircraft. A total of 28 GBU-53/B can be carried by the F-15E Strike Eagle using seven BRU-61/A suspension units, each carrying four bombs. Eight bombs along with two AIM-120 AMRAAM missiles can be carried in the weapons bay of the F-22 Raptor or the F-35 Lightning II (even the STOVL F-35B). The SDB II bomb rack originally did not fit inside the smaller F-35B weapons bay. A modification will be provided to coincide with the software package. An F-35 can carry 24 total bombs, 8 internally and 16 externally.

=== Planned deployment ===
The United States Air Force plans to use the bomb on the F-15E Strike Eagles as a no-drive zone enforcement weapon. The United States Navy and United States Marine Corps plan to use it on their versions of the F-35 Lightning II. Delivery for the first batch is planned for late 2014. Government requirements specify a 2016 delivery date. In October 2020, the Air Force approved the weapon for operational flight on the F-15E.

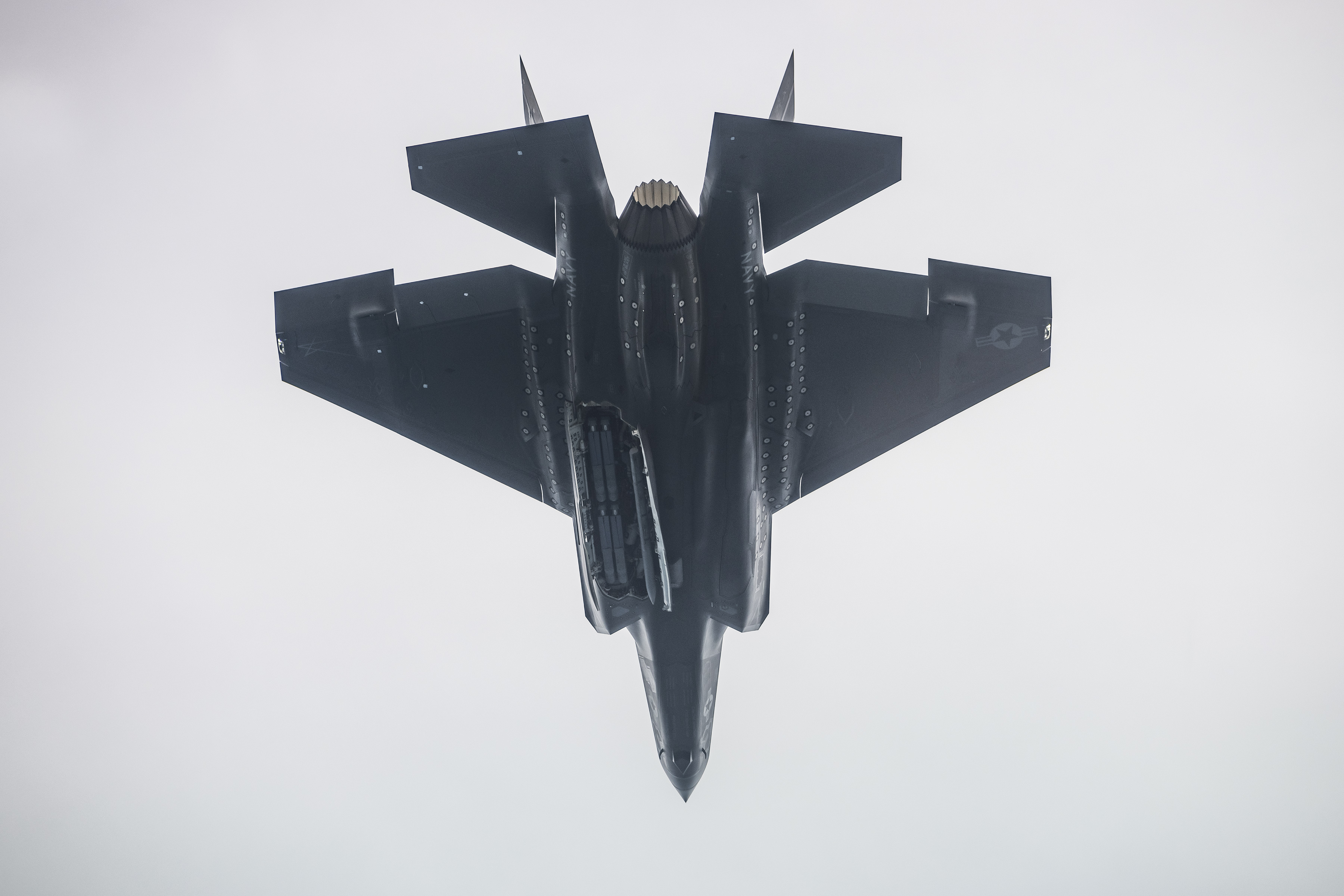
F-35C with four GBU-53/B StormBreakers in one of its internal weapons bays

The U.S. Navy plans to first integrate the SDB II onto their F/A-18 Super Hornet jets, then onto the F-35B and C fighters. With the F-35 program experiencing continued delays from a naval perspective, the U.S. Navy has decided to change their integration strategy by using the L3Harris BRU-55 smart multiple carriage racks on F/A-18E/F to store and fire the SDB II for the U.S. Navy.

The L3Harris BRU-55/A smart rack enables the aircraft to carry two MIL-STD-1760 smart weapons, such as the SDB II, on each weapon station. The electronic control assembly and digital communications from the aircraft to the weapon are handled by the BRU-55 canted vertical ejector rack, which in turn is attached to a BRU-32/A bomb ejector rack connected to SUU-79 pylons, and then to the aircraft fuselage. The BRU-55/A is an upgrade, largely on the electronics, to the BRU-33 CVER (Canted Vertical) bomb ejection rack. The BRU-55 was developed as part of the Mk-82 Joint Direct Attack Munition (JDAM) program. Current testing of this configuration will only be performed using the F/A-18E/F mid-board weapon stations, followed by testing SDB II and BRU-55 on in-board stations. The subsequent step will be to perform testing of the BRU-61/A Type 2 Universal Armament Interface (UAI) pneumatic rack, which will be the primary stores system for the F-35.

For U.S. Navy and U.S. Marine Corps integration with the F-35B and F-35C, the BRU-61/A will be utilized. The BRU-61/A is a pneumatic Multi-Stores Carriage System produced by Cobham Mission Systems. Each weapon station will be able to carry 4 SDB IIs. The BRU-61/A utilizes pneumatic ejection, which ejects the stores using compressed air, as opposed to previous systems which rely on pyrotechnic cartridges.

== History ==
The original Small Diameter Bomb (SDB) was developed by Boeing and made for non-moving targets. The SDB II is designed to destroy moving targets in dust and bad weather. The Raytheon version was deployed successfully in 26 missions over 21 days. Raytheon was awarded the contract in August, 2010. The North American division of MBDA continues to produce the wings. The Raytheon contract is worth US$450 million. Boeing announced that it would not protest the Raytheon award.

On July 17, 2012 the SDB II successfully engaged and hit a moving target during a flight test at the White Sands Missile Range. The bomb was dropped from an F-15E Strike Eagle, then acquired, tracked, and guided itself onto a moving target using its tri-mode seeker, scoring a direct hit.

In January 2013 four SDB IIs were loaded into the weapons bay of an F-35 Lightning II alongside an AIM-120 AMRAAM missile. The successful fit check validated that the SDB II was compatible with the F-35 and gave adequate clearance in sweeps of inboard and outboard bay doors.

Two SDB IIs successfully conducted live fire tests against moving targets, one in September 2014 and the other in February 2015. Successful live fire tests qualified the weapon for the Air Force to make a Milestone C decision, leading to entering low-rate initial production (LRIP).

The SDB II received Milestone C approval in early May 2015, completing a five-year development program and clearing it for production and deployment with the F-15E. A handful of failed test shots prolonged development from four years to five, but per-unit cost was $115,000 (year 2015 US Dollar valuation), reduced from the earlier goal of $180,000 (year 2010 US Dollar valuation, equivalent to $196,193 in 2015, inflation adjusted). Raytheon was awarded a $31 million contract on 12 June 2015 for the first LRIP lot of 144 SDB IIs.

Raytheon considered offering the SDB II to the United Kingdom for their Spear Capability 3 requirement to arm the Royal Air Force Eurofighter Typhoon and Royal Navy F-35B. To compete with MBDA's offer of a powered weapon, Raytheon considered a powered SDB II variant. In May 2016, the UK awarded a contract to MBDA to develop the SPEAR 3 missile, as it was the only weapon to meet the UK’s operational requirement. However, delays with Spear 3 led the United Kingdom to acquire SDB II as an interim capability for its F-35B aircraft in 2026.

The Republic of Korea Air Force is considering adopting the SDB II for use on its F-15K aircraft, as the bomb's capability to destroy moving targets more than 60 kilometres (37 mi) away in all kinds of weather is useful to strike North Korean mobile missile launchers. In October 2017, the U.S. approved the sale of 3,900 SDBs to the Royal Australian Air Force for use on their F-35As.

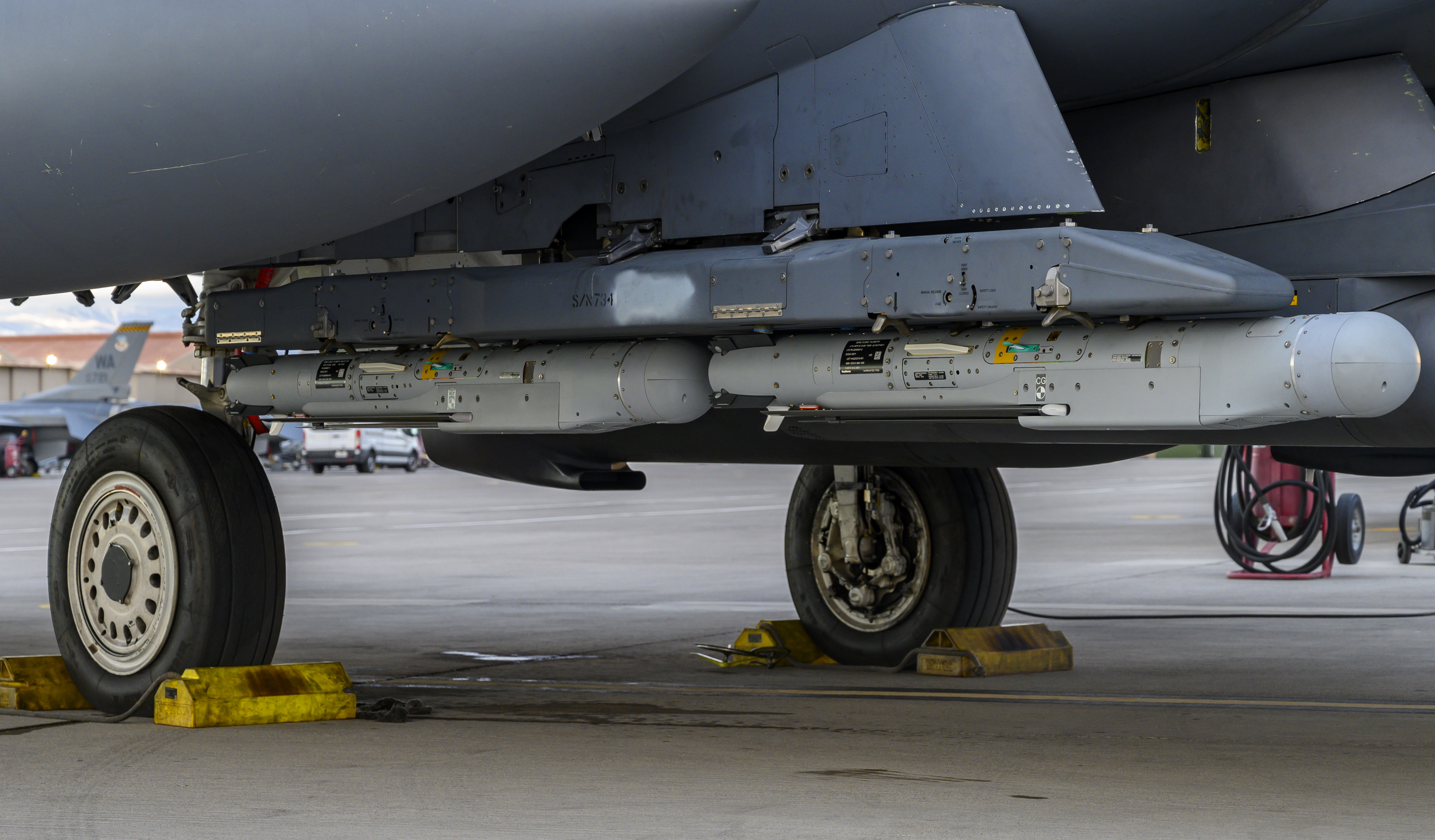
GBU-53/B StormBreakers on an F-15E Strike Eagle

In July 2018, Raytheon announced that the SDB II, recently renamed StormBreaker, had entered operational testing; the weapon had achieved a 90% success rate during developmental testing. The Air Force planned to declare the SDB II operational in September 2019, but a problem with the bomb's backup fin storage clips, other hardware and software issues, and the COVID-19 pandemic delayed its introduction. The StormBreaker was approved for operational use onboard the F-15E in September 2020. The Navy declared Early Operational Capability (EOC) of the StormBreaker on the F/A-18E/F in October 2023.

In March 2025, F/A-18 Super Hornets onboard the USS Harry S. Truman (CVN-75) were photographed carrying GBU-53/B StormBreakers on a nighttime strike against the Houthi rebels in Yemen. This would indicate the first use of the StormBreaker by the US Navy.

At the 2026 Farnborough International Airshow, Raytheon UK unveiled the Red Kite precision weapon, which uses the existing Stormbreaker airframe with UK internal components.

== Operators ==
Australia

- Royal Australian Air Force ordered 3,900 SDB-II in 2017.

Belgium

- Belgian Air Force

Canada

- Royal Canadian Air Force

Finland

- Finnish Air Force

Norway

- Royal Norwegian Air Force

Germany

- German Air Force requested 344 SDB-II as part of the F-35A acquisition.

Japan

- Japanese Air Self-Defense Force

Italy

- Italian Air Force

United Kingdom

- Royal Air Force

United States

- United States Air Force
- United States Marine Corps
- United States Navy

== See also ==
- DRDO Smart Anti-Airfield Weapon – (India)
- Mark 81 bomb – (United States) – 250 lb general-purpose bomb
- Brimstone (missile) – (United Kingdom) – 100 lb class air to surface missile
- SPEAR 3 – (United Kingdom) – a comparable air to surface missile
- AGM-154 Joint Standoff Weapon – (United States) – 1000 lb class glide and powered weapon by Raytheon
- Spice 250 – (Israel) – a comparable glide bomb
- KGGB – (South Korea)
- GBU-39 Small Diameter Bomb – (United States) – 250 lb precision-guided glide bomb
