= No-drive zone =

A no-drive zone is a form of interdiction and specifically a militarily enforced declaration of an intent to deny vehicular movement over a strategic or tactically valued line of communication by the threat of vehicle destruction. A capability first used in the Balkans and a term recently coined during the 2011 Libyan civil war as a potential course of action to prevent Muammar Gaddafi's government forces from approaching rebel strongholds near Benghazi, no-drive zones present unique challenges to military planners and warfighters. Unlike no-fly zone enforcement where electronic and visual means of identification of relatively few air entities allow warfighters to sort out potential targets, no-drive zones may include a variety of vehicle types with no electronic signatures to identify themselves and where enemy, friendly, and unaffiliated traffic are co-mingled. Enforcement from the air is further complicated by the necessary coordination with ground controller units providing persistent surveillance and possible identification when airborne intelligence, surveillance and reconnaissance (ISR) assets are unavailable or denied necessary airspace access.

Employing air-to-ground precision-guided munitions in support of a no-drive zone is an extremely challenging effort. Moving vehicles present a difficult target for fighter aircraft as they can stop or turn, use weather or night time for cover, compounding the targeting solution calculation or travel into areas where unacceptable collateral damage may occur after targeting and weapon release. The anticipated rules of engagement would likely include notification to the friendly or supported forces that no vehicles should be allowed to enter the zone as all vehicles detected in the zone will be considered as suspected hostile. Vehicles detected in the zone may be subjected to the Find, Fix, Track, Target, Engage, and Assess (F2T2EA) process by warfighters or engaged immediately per free-fire zone tactics. However, this interruption of ground travel over major roadways or designated geographic areas over a long period of time could have negative impacts on the economic flow of goods in the region.

Several different munitions would be available to enforce a no-drive zone. One system in full rate production, the GBU-53/B StormBreaker Small Diameter Bomb II, is being designed to attack moving targets, through the weather, and from standoff ranges. It will be able to distinguish between tracked vehicles and wheeled vehicles but cannot identify the exact vehicle type. The GBU-53/B accepts post-release control from either an airborne or ground controller unit to include the ability to receive retargeting and abort commands.

Other engagement options could include vehicle interdiction by other military vehicles, artillery, laser-guided bombs, or directed-energy weapons.

== See also ==
- Humanitarian corridor
