= KGGB =

South Korean GPS bomb guidance kit

Korean GPS Guided Bomb
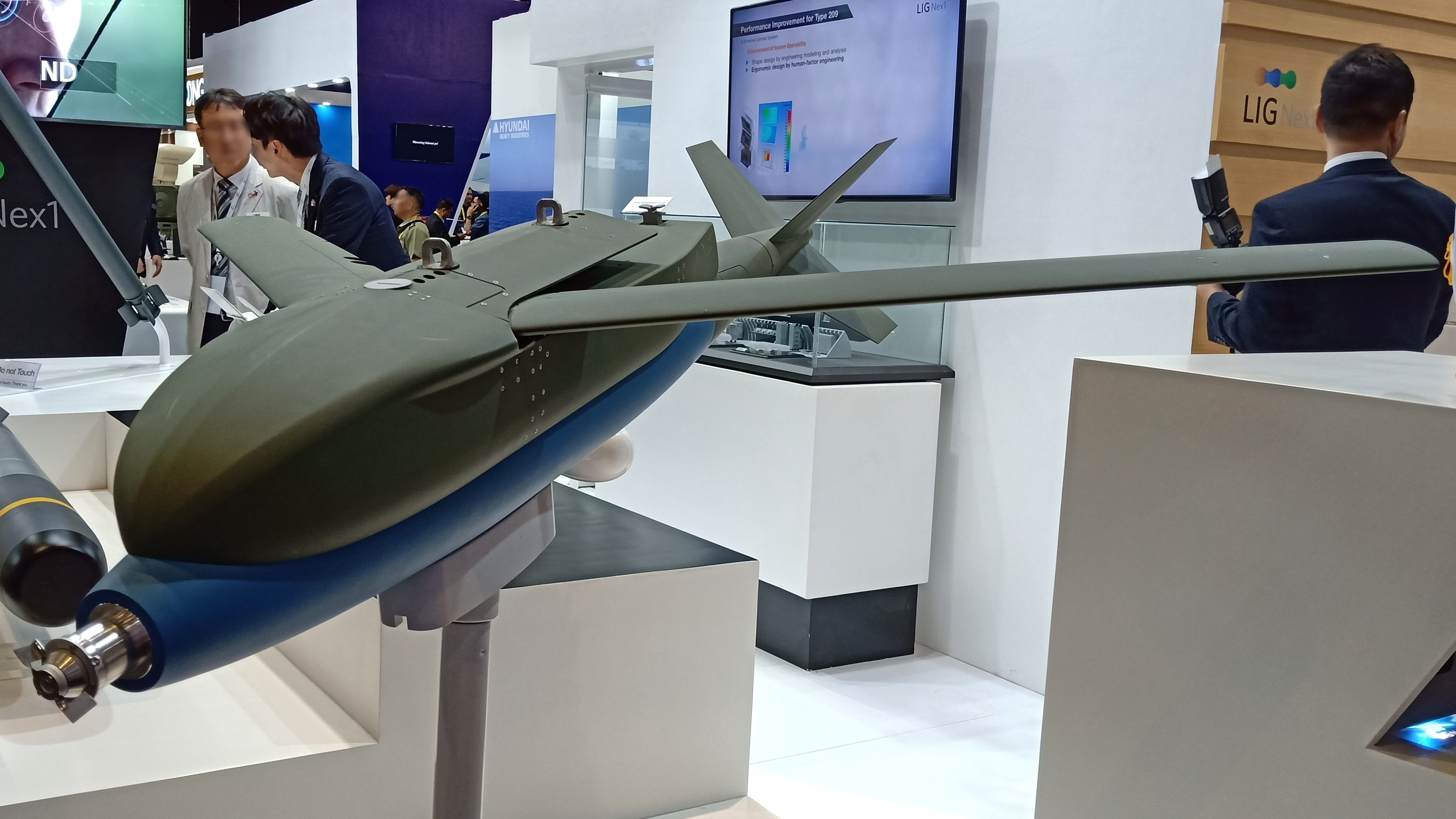
- KGGB scale model on display
- Type: Air-to-surface guided glide bomb
- Place of origin: South Korea

Service history
- In service: 2013–present
- Used by: Republic of Korea Air Force; Royal Saudi Air Force; Royal Thai Air Force
- Wars: 2025 Cambodian–Thai border crisis

Production history
- Designer: Agency for Defense Development; LIG Nex1
- Designed: 2007–2012
- Manufacturer: LIG Defense & Aerospace (final assembly); Kolon Spaceworks (main wing assembly)
- Unit cost: ₩100 million (US$84,800) (2012)
- No. built: 1,200 (Republic of Korea Air Force); 150 (Royal Saudi Air Force); 20 (Royal Thai Air Force)

Specifications
- Mass: Total weight: 316 kilograms (697 lb) CK-100K guidance kit: 89 kilograms (196 lb) MK-82 Bomb: 227 kilograms (500 lb)
- Length: 2.5 meters (8 ft 2 in)
- Width: 3.24 meters (10 ft 8 in)
- Operational range: 47–111 kilometers (29–69 mi)
- Flight altitude: 20,000–35,000 feet (6.1–10.7 km)
- Maximum speed: Mach 0.8 (270 m/s; 980 km/h)
- Guidance system: GPS/INS with fire-and-forget
- Accuracy: 0.9 m CEP at 57 km (F-16); 4 m CEP at 85 km (F-5E/F); 4.14 m CEP at 103 km (FA-50); 6.9 m CEP at 76.5 km (F-15E); 8.6 m CEP at 47 km (F-4E)
- Launch platform: F-4 Phantom II; F-5E/F Tiger II; F-15E Strike Eagle; F-16 Fighting Falcon; FA-50 Fighting Eagle; KF-21 Boramae

The KGGB (Korean GPS Guided Bomb; Korean: 한국형 GPS 유도폭탄; Hanja: 韓國型GPS制導炸彈), or simply GGB, is a guided glide bomb system, attached to MK-82 conventional general-purpose bomb. The KGGB is capable of striking targets from long-distances and features fire-and-forget capability. It was developed by the Agency for Defense Development (ADD) and LIG Nex1 (now LIG Defense & Aerospace).

== Design ==
The KGGB is a precision-guided munition (PGM) with improved accuracy and range attached with CK-100K GPS/INS guidance kit in conventional general purpose bombs. This system, which integrates a Global Positioning System (GPS) with an Inertial Navigation System (INS), allows for effective operation regardless of time of day or adverse weather conditions. It features an anti-GPS jamming function, enabling it to strike targets with high accuracy even in a GPS-denied environment, significantly enhancing survivability and mission success. Mission planning data established on the ground is stored in the Pilot Display Unit (PDU) controlling the KGGB, entered into the fighter-mounted KGGB, and after takeoff, if a bomb is dropped within the mission area, the bomb will fly in the air and hit the target.

When the pilot enters the coordinate values for target strikes into the PDU, the coordinate information is stored in the guidance kit, ready to drop the bomb. Guided bombs with military GPS receivers with a built-in Selective availability anti-spoofing module (SAASM) can strike targets along a flight path set to unpowered gliding after being dropped, and can also immediately modify the path to strike the rear of the target.

The guidance kit is combined with a special main wing assembly called Flaperon that can control flight direction, flight altitude and flight speed in the air. This wing assembly controls the flight direction by adjusting the lift force of the wing during flight, or acts as a flight altitude increase, deceleration or flight altitude decrease, acceleration of flight speed, and serves to fly further away and accurately hit the intended target. The Flaperon enables it to execute a turning attack on an enemy target concealed behind a hill or mountain while also contributing to stable posture control in challenging wind conditions.

The guidance system also supports two distinct flight modes, providing tactical flexibility. The Circular mode allows the bomb to orbit the target and approach from a desired direction, while the Waypoint mode enables it to follow a pre-set flight path, bypassing threat areas to safely reach its target. The KGGB also features a target entry angle adjustment function. This allows pilots to precisely set the bomb's final descent angle, with a range of 20 to 75 degrees. This functionality is critical for engaging targets in complex environments, such as those hidden behind natural terrain or urban structures.

The KGGB is equipped with a wind direction estimation algorithm that analyzes and compensates for surrounding wind speed and direction in real-time during its flight. Given that wind speeds increase significantly with altitude, this feature plays a crucial role in maximizing both the weapon's range and its terminal accuracy. By continuously adjusting its flight path based on these real-time atmospheric conditions, the KGGB can maintain its trajectory and ensure a precise strike, even on distant targets. The system incorporates advanced altitude management technology to ensure precise target engagement. This technology controls the bomb's excess kinetic and potential energy to guide it into the target accurately. Because the KGGB is equipped with Flaperons, which generate lift, the system can regulate the bomb's descent speed during the final attack phase. This prevents the bomb from overshooting the target and ensures a highly accurate strike.

The KGGB's GPS-aided INS devices allow the bomb to attack targets independently, and the fighter can safely return to the base immediately after the bomb is dropped, ensuring fighter and pilot viability. The KGGB is a standalone type guided weapon that can be mounted on F-4 Phantom, F-5 Tiger, F-15K Slam Eagle, F-16 Fighting Falcon, FA-50 Fighting Eagle and KF-21 Boramae fighter jets and is remotely controlled by the portable pilot display unit without the need for further modifications or systems to the aircraft.

== Variants ==
=== KGGB 2 ===
Since 2020, South Korea has been developing a new variant, the KGGB 2. It is expected to be further equipped with a seeker and control system, enabling it to target moving objects, along with a mid-infrared seeker, semi-active laser (SAL), and a weapons data link (WDL). Additionally, its weight is expected to increase from 500 pounds to 1,000 pounds.

ADD and LIG Nex1 are developing advanced versions of the KGGB, creating a multi-purpose precision-guided bomb. These variants will incorporate an electrostatic bomb and an aerial mine delivery system. The KF-21 Boramae and future FA-50 aircraft will be equipped with a KGGB Interface Unit (KIU), allowing them to control up to four of these bombs.

== Combat history ==
On 24 July 2025, the KGGB has seen combat use by the Royal Thai Air Force (RTAF) during border conflict with Cambodia. Photos from July 2025 shows a RTAF F-16 carrying a Mk 82 bomb converted with the KGGB kit, which Thailand acquired from South Korea in 2022. The RTAF used the KGGB with its F-16As to struck Cambodian military targets. Images on social media on 25 June 2025, showed the KGGB on the left wing of a RTAF F-16, converting a Mk 82 500 pound (220 kg) drop bomb into a precision surface-strike munition.

== Operators ==
KGGB operators

=== Current operators ===
Saudi Arabia

- Royal Saudi Air Force: 150 kits (2018)

South Korea

- Republic of Korea Air Force: The ROKAF's KGGB inventory has grown from 1,200 kits in 2018 to over 1,500 units by 2025, following a procurement expansion in 2020.

Thailand

- Royal Thai Air Force: The RTAF first acquired 20 units of the KGGB kit from South Korea in 2022. These were obtained in two batches for an initial cost of approximately $2.8 million and were intended for testing and integration on their aircraft, specifically the T-50TH and F-16 jets.
- Recent reports and social media imagery indicate that the RTAF has since used these KGGBs in combat, marking their first known operational use outside of the Korean Peninsula. The reported strikes, conducted during a recent border conflict with Cambodia, targeted military command posts.

=== Potential operators ===
Colombia

- The Colombian Air Force has shown significant interest in the air-to-ground guided bomb 'KGGB,' which can be mounted on existing fighter aircraft without the need to modify their avionics.

Poland

- Polish Air Forces: Poland, which signed a deal in 2022 to buy 48 FA-50 from KAI, is reportedly looking to also get the KGGB.

== See also ==
- AGM-154 Joint Standoff Weapon – (United States)
- GBU-53/B StormBreaker – (United States)
- JDAM-ER – (United States)
- UMPK (bomb kit) – (Russia)
- GBU-39 Small Diameter Bomb – (United States)
- Spice – (Israel) – SPICE 250, SPICE 1000
