= Denel Dynamics Umbani =

South African precision-guided bomb kit

Umbani
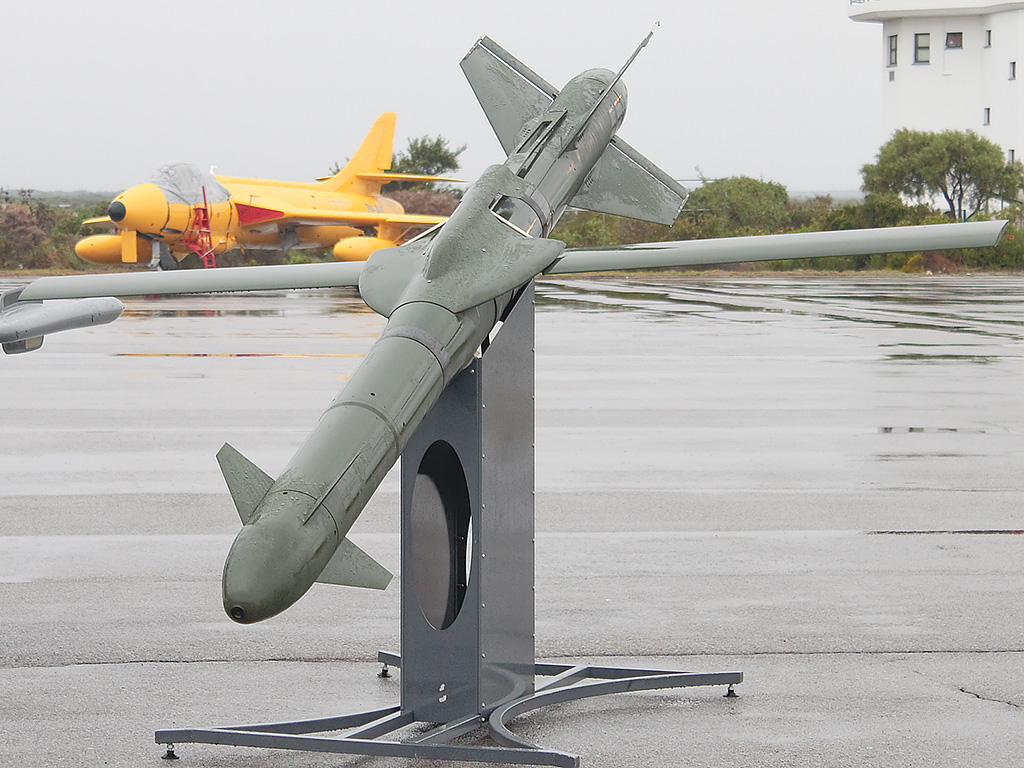
- Umbani PGM on display at the Test Flight and Development Centre of the South African Air Force Airshow in 2012
- Place of origin: South Africa

Production history
- Variants: See Variants

Specifications
- Propellant: Rocket motor
- Guidance system: Inertial guidance/GPS

The Umbani (Ndebele/Zulu: lightning) is a precision-guided bomb kit manufactured by Denel Dynamics in South Africa. It consists of a number of modules fitted to NATO standard Mk81, Mk82 or Mk83 low drag free-fall bombs to convert them into guided glide bombs.

== Design ==
The modular kit consists of a number units that are attached to a standard Mk80-series bomb. A guidance system and large tail fins are the most basic form of the system, optional folding wings and a rocket motor may be added to increase the stand-off range up to 120 kilometres (75 mi) or add a low-level launch capability.

Range using different configurations:

- Standard bomb kit - 40 km
- With folding wing kit - 120 km
- With wing kit and Extended Range (ER) module - 200 km

=== Guidance ===
The weapon's all-weather, day and night capability is due to the GPS–INS guidance system. It increases accuracy to a claimed 3m CEP by adding an imaging infrared or a semi-active laser seeker terminal guidance system.

== Testing and qualification ==
The system was first tested on the Atlas Cheetah, later an Aerosud-owned former South African Air Force (SAAF) Dassault Mirage F1 was used after the Cheetah retired. The system has been integrated on the SAAF's BAE Hawk Mk120 lead-in fighter trainer aircraft. Qualification on the SAAF's Saab JAS 39 Gripen was not considered due to the high costs associated with integration on a supersonic aircraft. The Gripens have been armed with GBU-12 Paveway II bombs instead.

== Sales ==
The manufacturer has expressed optimism at the export potential of the system following qualification on the Hawk as a number of air forces worldwide operate Hawks.

An unnamed country has placed an order worth ZAR1.2 billion for the weapon. Although the SAAF has funded most of the development costs of the weapon system it has not yet placed a firm order for any.

Tawazun Dynamics, the joint venture company created by Denel and Tawazun, has been awarded a US$492.74 million contract from the United Arab Emirates Air Force for precision guided munitions (PGMs) for its Mirage 2000-9 fighters. The fighter jets will receive the Tawazun Dynamics developed Al Tariq bomb guidance kit which is the renamed Denel Dynamics Umbani.

== Joint venture ==
On September 20, 2012, at the Africa Aerospace and Defence 2012 show in Pretoria, South Africa, Denel Dynamics announced a joint venture with the EDGE Group of the United Arab Emirates. Their collaboration aims to develop and manufacture a range of precision weapons. The initial product from this partnership will be a variant of the Umbani known as the "Al-Tariq,"marking the inaugural offering from the newly established EDGE Group company.
