= Mixed Artillery Brigade =

- Мешовита артиљеријска бригада
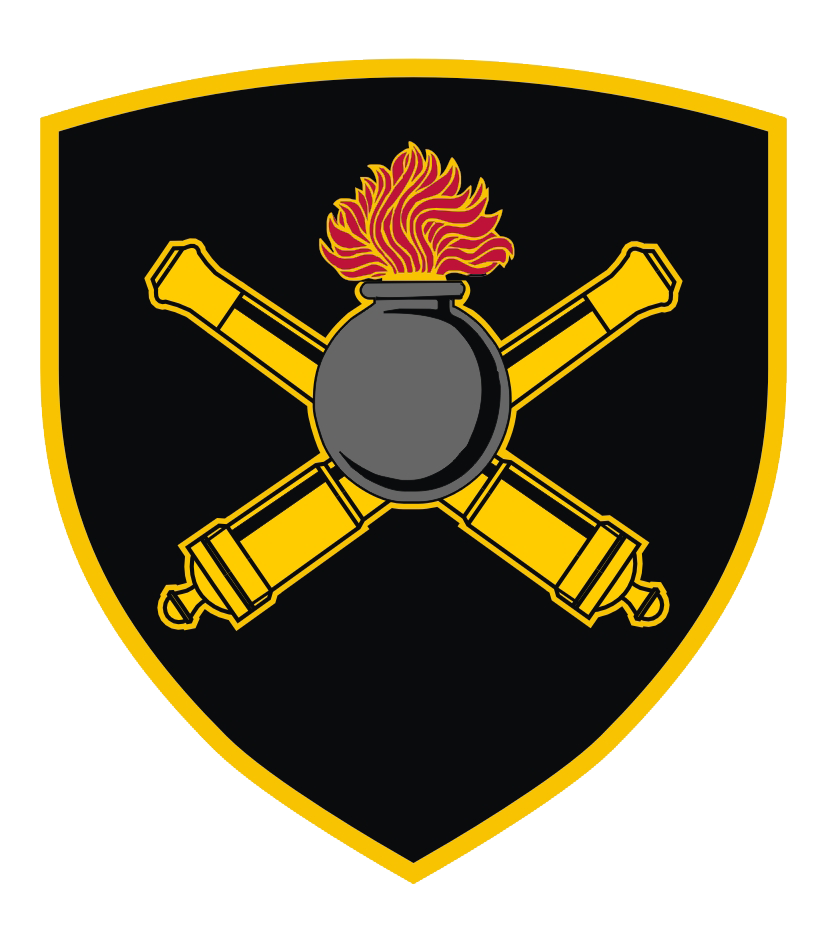
- Active: 2007–present
- Country: Serbia
- Branch: Serbian Army
- Role: Artillery
- Part of: Serbian Armed Forces
- Garrison/HQ: Niš
- Anniversaries: 14 September

Commanders
- Current commander: Col. Miodrag Mladenović

The Mixed Artillery Brigade (Serbian: Мешовита артиљеријска бригада, romanized: Mešovita artiljerijska brigada) is the artillery brigade of the Serbian Army with the task of providing artillery support to other Serbian Army units.

== History ==
The brigade was formed on June 4, 2007 from former 203rd Mixed Artillery Brigade.

== Structure ==
The Mixed Artillery Brigade consists of artillery and rocket artillery units.

- Command Battalion – Niš
- 1st Howitzer-Cannon-Artillery Battalion – Niš
- 2nd Howitzer-Cannon-Artillery Battalion – Niš
- 3rd Cannon-Artillery Battalion – Niš
- 4th Cannon-Artillery Battalion – Niš
- Self-propelled Cannon and Howitzer Artillery Battalion – Niš
- Mixed Artillery Rocket Battalion – Niš
- 69th Logistics Battalion – Niš

== Equipment ==
- PULS 306/370 mm self-propelled multiple rocket launcher (armed with Predator Hawk tactical ballistic missiles and EXTRA artillery rockets)
- M-87 Orkan 262 mm self-propelled multiple rocket launcher
- RM-70 Vampire 122 mm self-propelled multiple rocket launcher
- Nora B-52 155 mm self-propelled howitzer
- Nora M-84 152 mm howitzer
- SkyStriker loitering munition
- Shadow 50 loitering munition
- Shadow 25 loitering munition
- SM2 loitering munition
- Gavran 145 loitering munition
- Osica loitering munition

== Traditions ==
=== Anniversary ===
The anniversary of the unit is celebrated on September 14. On that date in 1918 with artillery bombardment of the German and Bulgarian positions started the breakthrough of Macedonian front in World War I, led by Serbian and Allied forces.

=== Patron saint ===
The unit's slava or its patron saint is Saint Marina the Great Martyr.

== Gallery ==
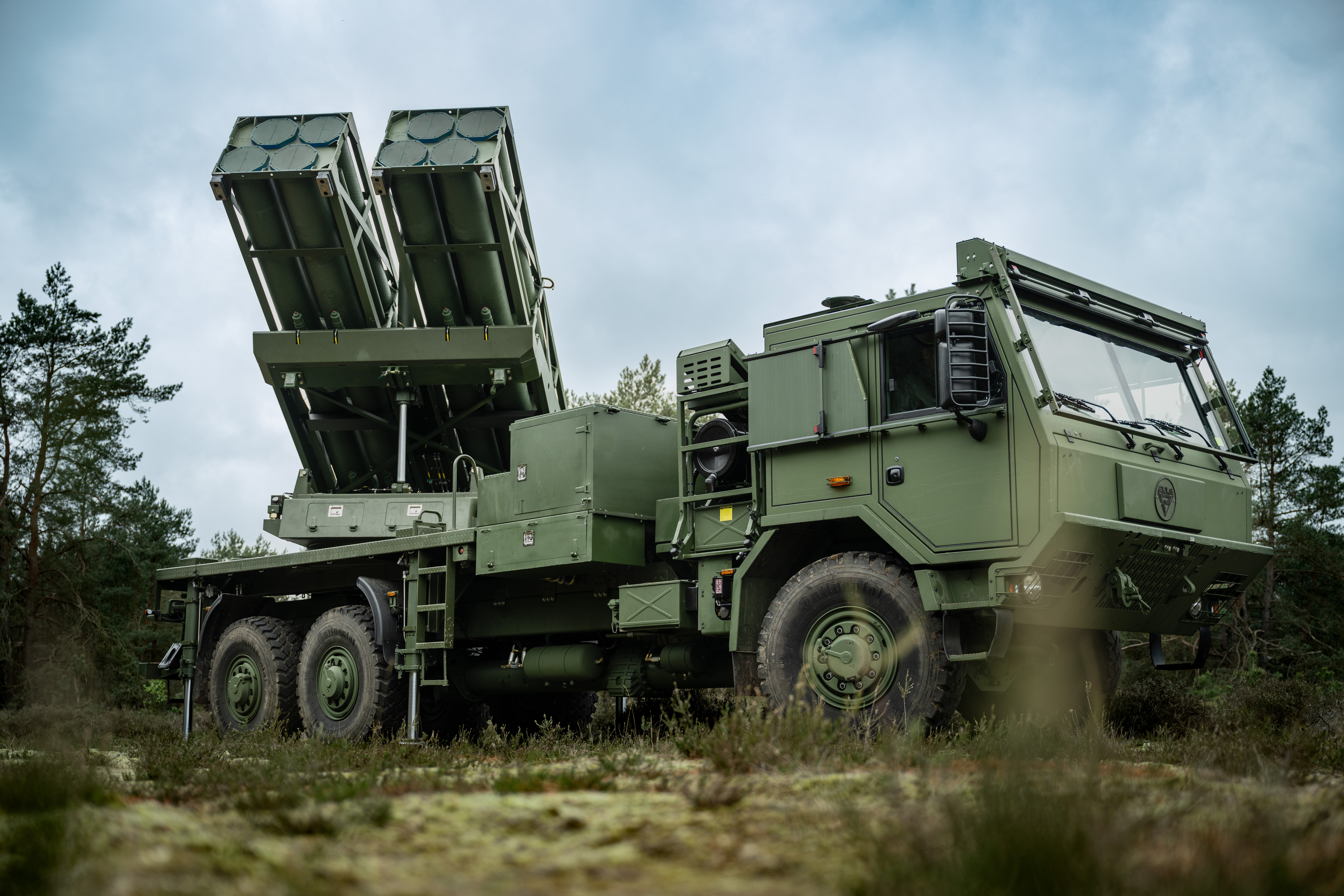
PULS

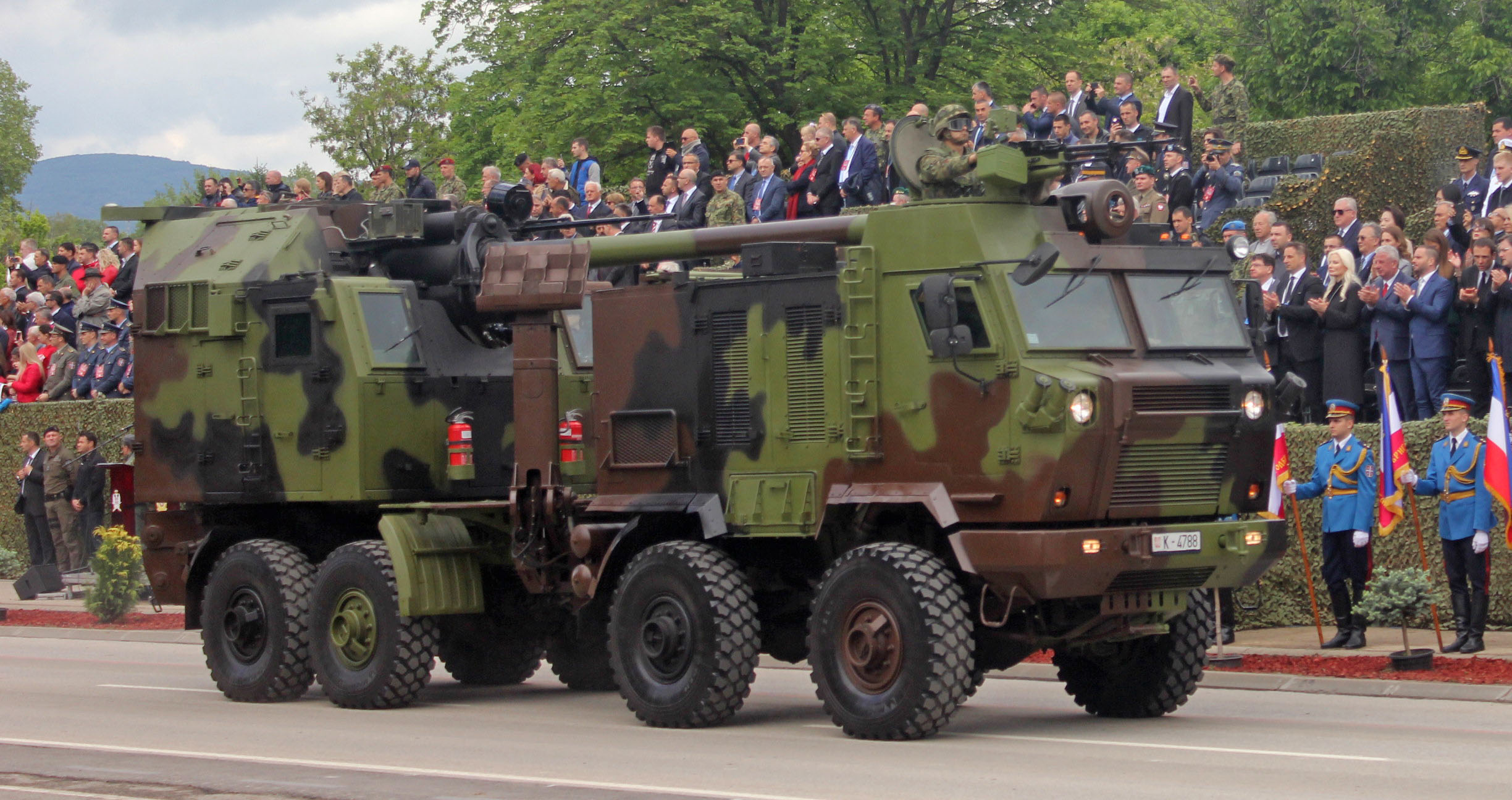
Nora B-52

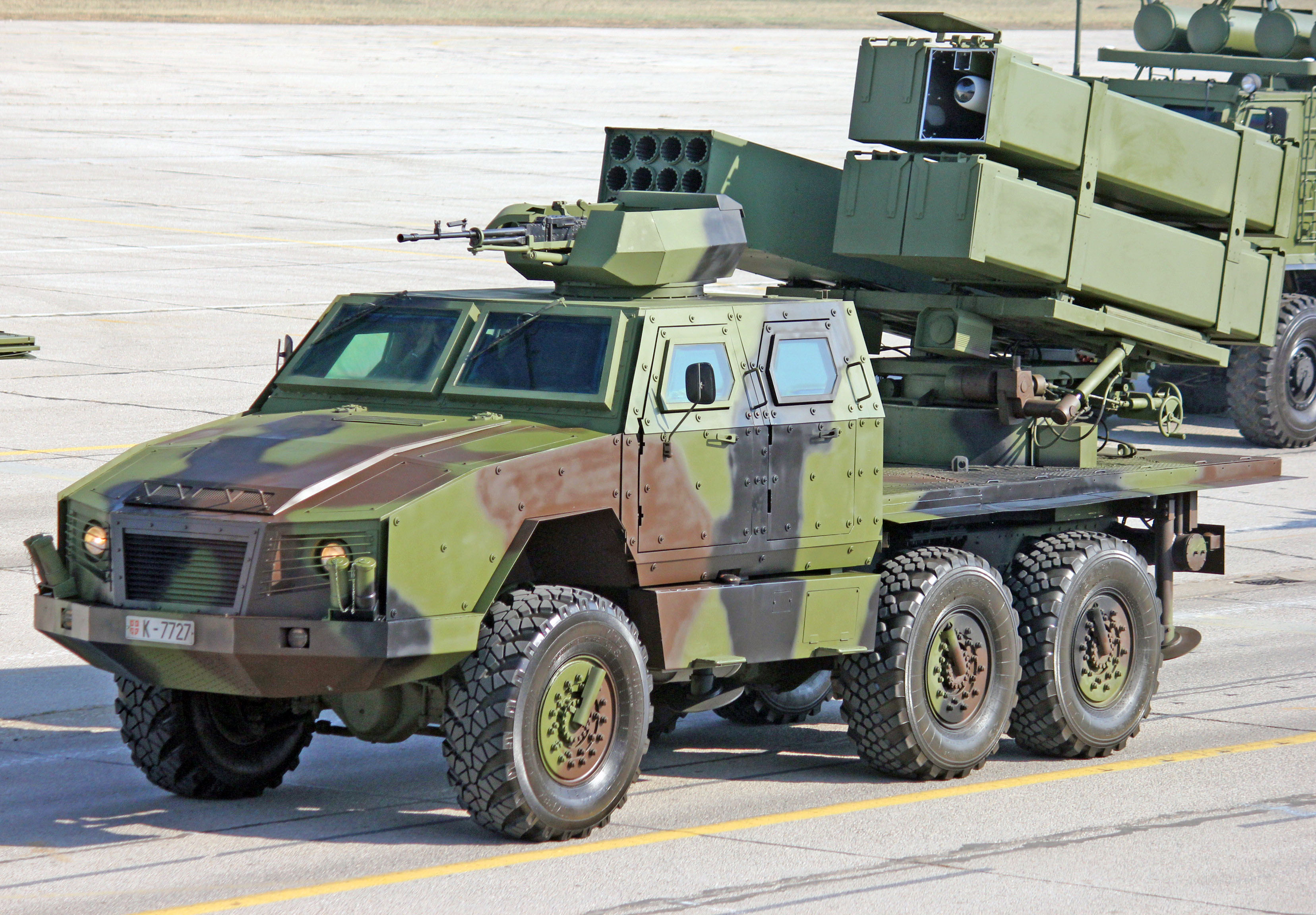
M-18 Oganj

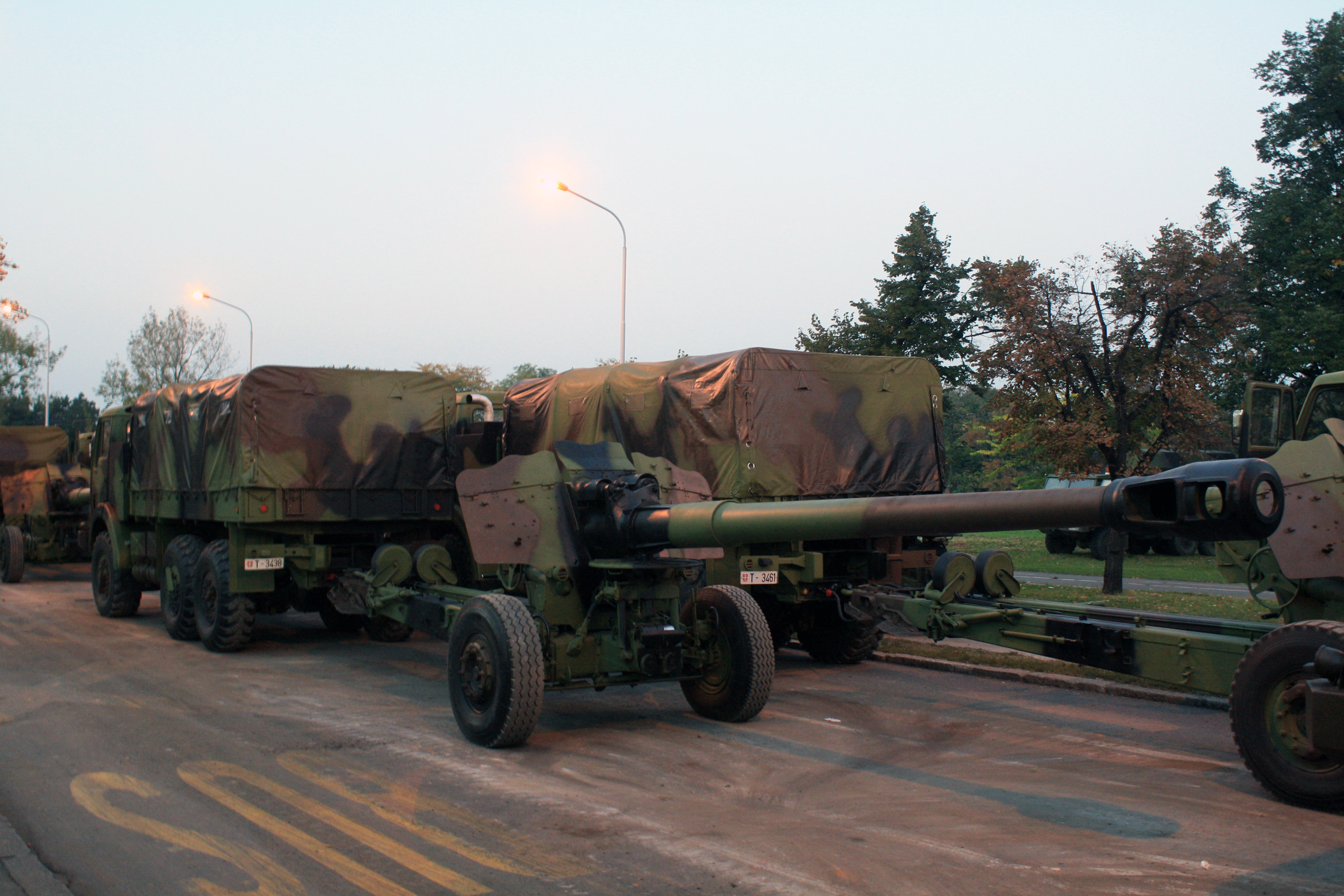
Nora M-84
