= Naiza (multiple rocket launcher) =

Multiple rocket launcher

The Naiza (lance) multiple rocket launcher was developed by Israeli Military Industries (IMI) for the Kazakhstan Ministry of Defense. It is similar to the LYNX multiple rocket launcher.

The Naiza MLRS uses interchangeable rocket pods. It is capable of firing 122-mm Grad rockets, 160-mm IMI LAR-160s, 200-mm IMI EXTRAs, and 220-mm BM-27 Uragans.
