= Naiza =

Naiza can refer to:

- Ak-Tash, Jalal-Abad
- Naiza (multiple rocket launcher)
