= SkySniper =

Israeli air-to-surface missile

SkySniper is an air-to-surface missile developed by Israel Aerospace Industries IAI. The 4 metres (13 ft) long weapon has a maximum range of 250 kilometres (130 nmi; 160 mi), and carries a general purpose blast/fragmentation warhead. The SkySniper uses GPS/INS guidance for targeting under all weather conditions. IAI designed the SkySniper for a maximum loadout of four missiles on contemporary combat aircraft such as the F-15, F/A-18, F-16, MiG-29, and Kfir.

== See also ==
- MARS (missile)
