= PULS (multiple rocket launcher) =

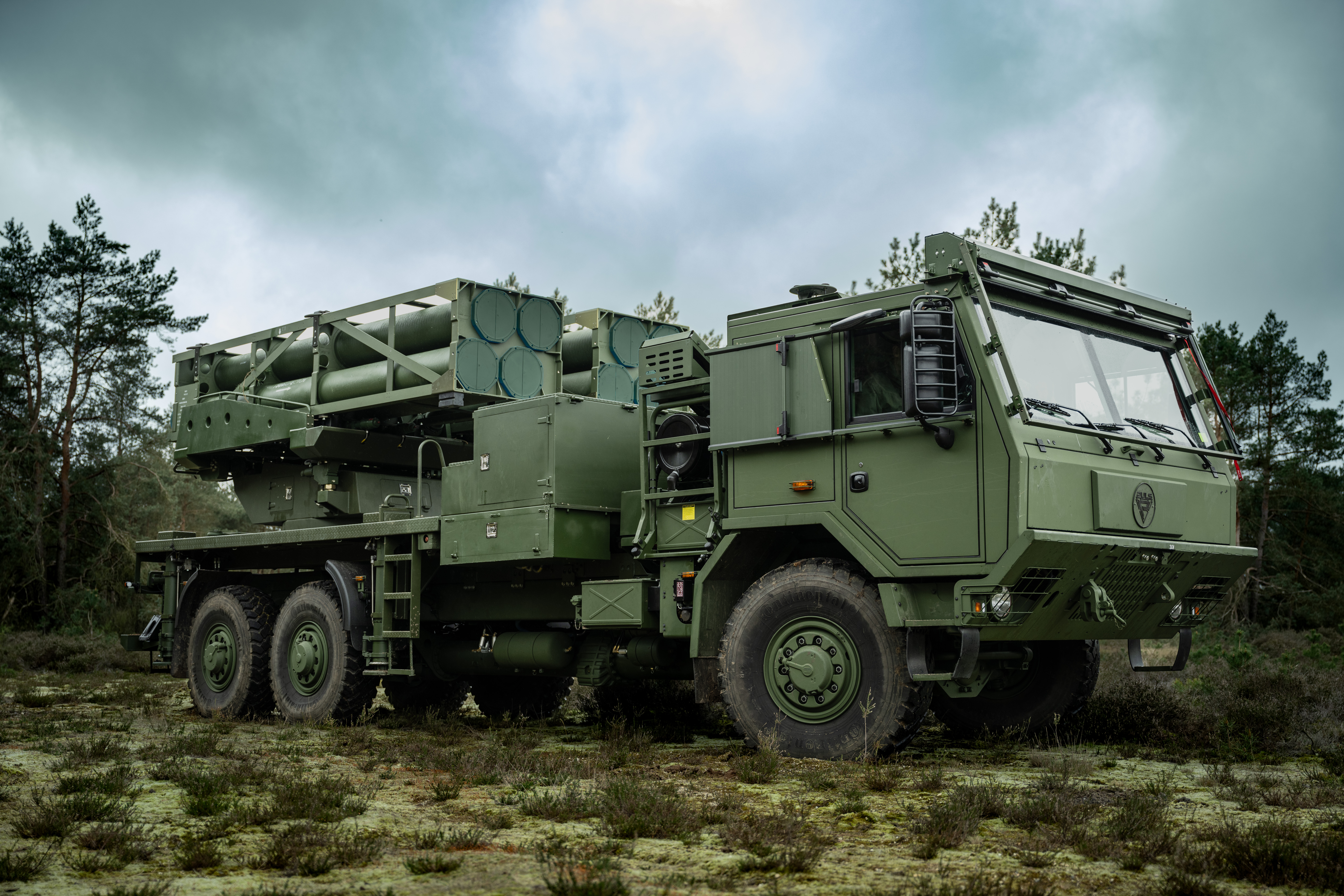
- PULS (Precise & Universal Launching System)
- Type: Multiple rocket launcher Tactical ballistic missile launcher
- Place of origin: Israel

Service history
- Wars: Second Nagorno-Karabakh War; Gaza war

Production history
- Designer: Israel Military Industries
- Manufacturer: Israel Military Industries (now Elbit Systems)

Specifications
- Caliber: 122 mm 160 mm 306 mm 330 mm 370 mm
- Maximum firing range: 300 km
- Guidance system: GPS and INS

PULS ("Precise & Universal Launching System", formerly known as Lynx MRL) is a multiple rocket launcher developed and manufactured by Elbit Systems (formerly Israel Military Industries) and used by Israel Defense Forces and other countries.

== History ==
Israel Military Industries introduced the Lynx in 2013.

After the acquisition of Israel Military Industries by Elbit Systems in 2018, an upgraded and modernized version of the Lynx was developed, called the PULS (Precise & Universal Launching System). The Defense Technology Institute (DTI) of Thailand is partnering with Elbit Systems to develop a Thai version of the PULS called D-11A.

The EURO-PULS is being developed in cooperation between the German KNDS and ELBIT targeting the European market by integration of additional missile types. As part of the project, the US made GMLRS and other HIMARS missiles would have been integrated with the EURO-PULS launchers, however, the management of Lockheed Martin, the US missile manufacturer, refused to do so.

In January 2023, Denmark announced it is negotiating the acquisition of 8 PULS systems for the Royal Danish Army.

In March 2023, the Dutch Ministry of Defence announced that it would acquire 20 PULS systems for the Royal Netherlands Army with the first systems to be delivered in the same year. The contract worth 305 million dollars was signed on May 18.

On 10 October 2023, the government of Spain decided to order the locally manufactured version of the PULS systems for SILAM programme (es:SILAM). In September 2025 the Spanish government cancelled the deal after placing an embargo on any arms purchases or sales involving Israel over the war in Gaza.

Israel introduced the PULS into IDF service in 2020 under the name Lahav, which is a PULS rocket module mounted on a HEMTT truck chassis. It was first used operationally in February 2024 during the Gaza war.

In April 2026 Elbit Systems announced an agreement worth about $750 million to sell PULS launchers and munitions to Greece. The deal was reportedly for 36 launchers.

=== India ===
In July 2025, India-based private company NIBE Limited signed a Technology Collaboration Agreement with Elbit Systems through which the former will manufacture Advanced Universal Rocket Launcher 'Surya' in India. The weapon system will have a maximum range of 300 km. The technology transfer will cater to both India's domestic market as well as foreign customers.

On 2 January 2026, it was widely reported that NIBE Limited received an emergency procurement contract from the Indian Army to manufacture and supply Universal Rocket Launcher System, derived from Israel's PULS system, including ground equipment, accessories, ESP and ammunition at a cost of ₹292.69 crore (US$31 million). Under the emergency route, the firm is expected to deliver the system within 12 months. The ammunition included will have a maximum range of 150 km and 300 km with a CEP of less than 5 metres. It can also launch loitering munition with a 100 km range. The system has designated as SuryaAstra in Indian service.

The SuryaAstra system was part of New Delhi's Republic Day parade on 26 January and featured EXTRA guided rockets and Predator Hawk missiles. While the role of the local prime contractor, NIBE Limited, was the domestic production of the launchers, Elbit Systems was responsible for the system integration, fire control and the supply of advanced munitions. The contract had been executed by 29 January. The package covered two launchers, munitions and a replenishment-cum-loader vehicle along with munitions, spare parts and a support package. This would be followed by live-fire trials and regiment-level, follow-on supply orders if the trials are successful.

The live-fire trials had commenced by March 2026. On 18 and 19 May, NIBE conducted firing trials of both the rocket and missile systems from the Launch Complex-III (LC-III) of the Integrated Test Range located at Chandipur. On 11 November, trials were conducted from LC-III. The trials demonstrated the system's performance at four range brackets — 30 km, 50 km, 150 km and 300 km, validating the short range and deep strike capability of the weapon.

== Design ==
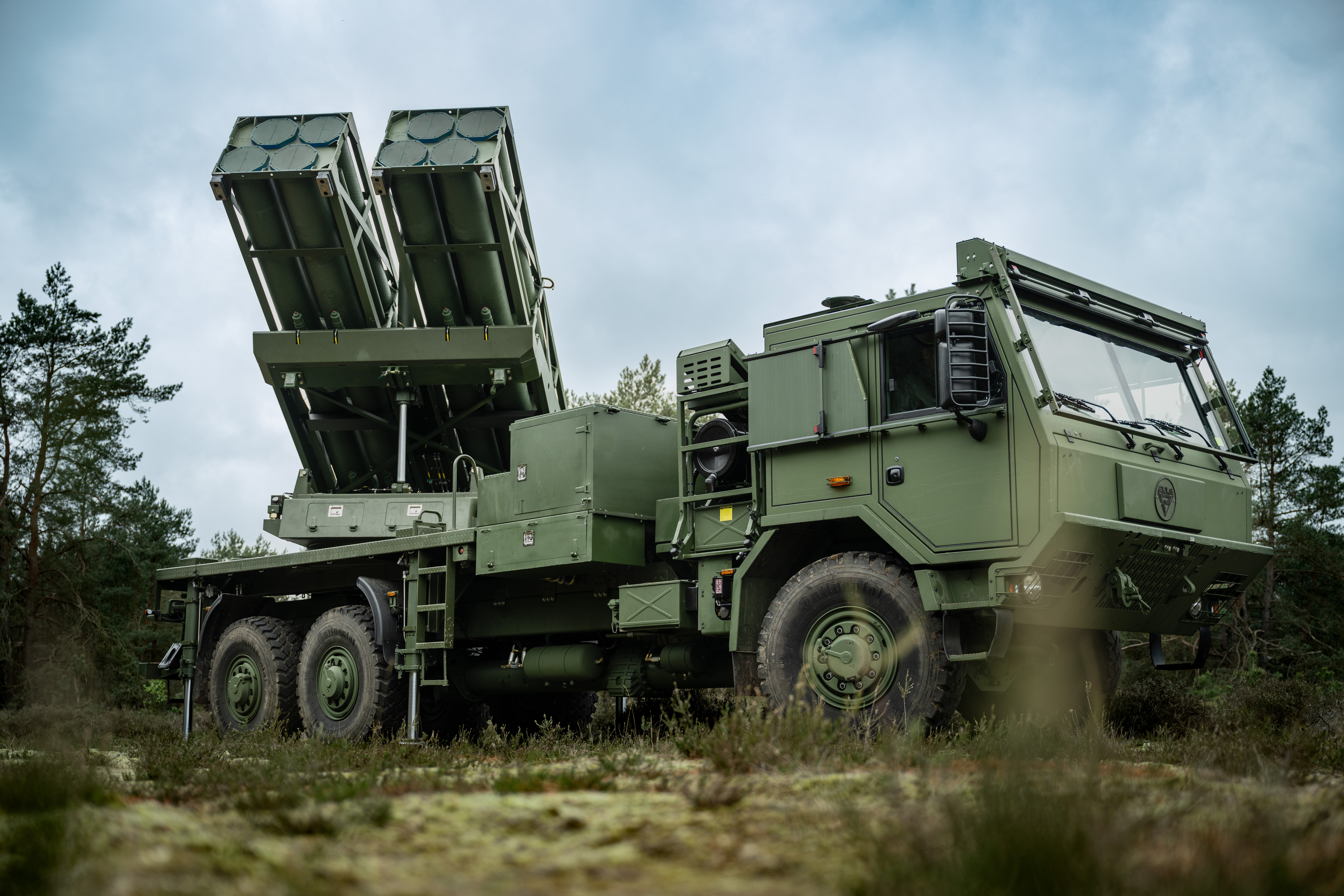
Danish PULS-launcher with EXTRA type missile pods

It can be configured to carry a variety of rockets in two sealed pod containers: 36 (2 pods × 18 rockets each) 122mm Grad rockets; or 26 (2×13) 160mm LAR-160 or ACCULAR rockets; or eight (2×4) 306mm EXTRA rockets; two (2×1) 330mm Delilah missiles or four (2×2) 370mm Predator Hawk tactical ballistic missiles. A shorter (80 km) range GMLRS equivalent was also introduced under the name EXTRA-MR. These are smaller, six per pod missiles with laser guidence (SAL) beside the regular GPS/INS guidence.

The PULS is also able to carry and launch SkyStriker loitering munitions, which is a unique feature among MLRS systems. The SkyStriker drones have a range over 100 km and 6 drones are packed into a single container according to a video published by Elbit Systems. The drone can engage moving targets unlike the other missiles of the PULS system, but it can also return and land after doing reconnaissance and can be relaunched again.

=== Missile options ===
Rocket / missile	Diameter	Weight	Max. quantity	Guidance	Max. range	Accuracy CEP	Warhead
Training Rockets	122 mm		18 pcs / pod 36 pcs / vehicle	None	15 km	n.a.	n.a.
GRAD	122 mm	66 kg	18 pcs / pod 36 pcs / vehicle	None	40 km	500 m	20 kg
LAR160	160 mm	110 kg	13 pcs / pod 26 pcs / vehicle	None	45 km	n.a.	46 kg
Accular 122	122 mm	72 kg	18 pcs / pod 36 pcs / vehicle	GPS/INS	35 km	10 m	20 kg
Accular 160	160 mm	n.a.	13 pcs / pod 26 pcs / vehicle	GPS/INS	40 km	10 m	35 kg
SkyStriker UAV	n.a.	n.a.	6 pcs / pod 12 pcs / vehicle	CCD/IR and GPS/INS	250 km	1 m	5–10 kg
EXTRA MR	n.a.	n.a.	6 pcs / pod 12 pcs / vehicle	GPS/INS + SAL	80 km	10m (GPS) or 1m (SAL)	n.a.
EXTRA	306 mm	570 kg	4 pcs / pod 8 pcs / vehicle	GPS/INS	150 km	10 m	120 kg
Delilah (cruise missile)	330 mm	187 kg	2 pcs / pod 4 pcs / vehicle	CCD/IR and GPS/INS	250 km	1 m	30 kg
NSM (cruise missile)*	n.a.	407 kg	1 pcs / pod 2 pcs / vehicle	TERCOM and GNSS/INS, IIR	185 km	n.a.	125 kg
Predator Hawk	370 mm	800 kg	2 pcs / pod 4 pcs / vehicle	GPS/INS	300 km	10 m	140 kg
JFS-M (cruise missile)*	n.a.	400 kg	1 pcs / pod 2 pcs / vehicle	TERCOM and GNSS/INS, IIR	499 km	n.a.	80-120 kg

*Advertised for the Euro-PULS / MARS 3 verison of the PULS system.

== Operators ==
=== Current operators ===
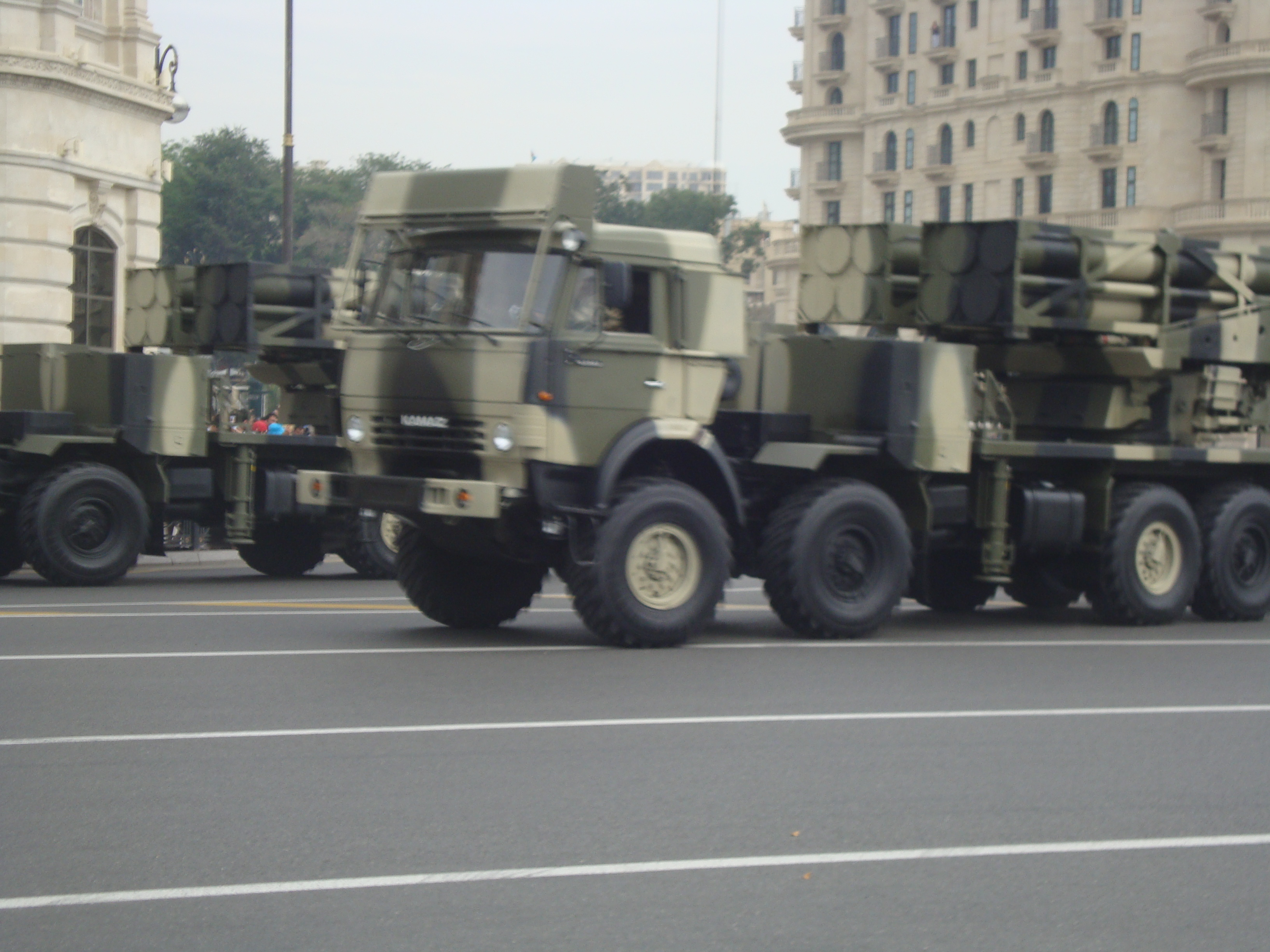
Lynx launcher of the Azerbaijani Land Forces with EXTRA rocket pods

Azerbaijan

- Azerbaijani Land Forces – 6 Lynx and 50 EXTRA missiles were acquired and then used in the 2020 Nagorno-Karabakh War.

Denmark

- Royal Danish Army – 8 PULS delivered (contract signed on 2 March 2023) for US$133 million. The PULS is based on a Tatra T815 6×6. All the launchers and missiles were handed over by the end first quarter of 2024. In November 2024, Danish media reported that an officer serving in the Danish army claimed that rocket systems did not have military GPS and were therefore vulnerable to electronic countermeasures. This caused a political debate in Denmark. ELBIT Systems denied the claim.

Netherlands

- Royal Netherlands Army – 20 PULS on order on Scania Gryphus chassis with armoured cabins. Contract worth US$305 million was signed on 18 May 2023, four vehicles to be delivered in 2023.
- The first TATRA truck based PULS launcher was delivered in February 2024. The rest will be built locally on armoured Scania Gryphus 8×8 trucks in 2025 and 2026.

Kazakhstan

- Kazakh Ground Forces – 18 Lynx and 50 EXTRA rockets ordered in 2007, delivered in 2008–09. The Naiza is a derivative of the Lynx developed in collaboration, based on the KamAZ-6350 8×8 chassis.

Rwanda

- Rwandan Army – 5 Lynx ordered in 2007, in service since 2008.

Serbia

- Serbian Army – Elbit Systems announced in 2024 that it was awarded a contract worth approximately $335 million to supply 20 PULS multiple rocket launchers to the Serbian Army. The contract will be performed over a period of 3.5 years. The first PULS launcher was shown on military parade in 2025.

India

- Indian Army – Two launchers, a replenishment and loader vehicle along with EXTRA rockets and Predator Hawk missiles were delivered by 29 January. The launchers were manufactured in India by NIBE Limited while the munitions, fire-control systems were supplied by Elbit. The system is designated SuryaAstra in Indian service. The contract was signed on 2 January. Live firing trials are underway as of November 2026 to validate the system for further orders.

=== Unknown customers ===
- Elbit Systems announced on 18 July 2023 that it was awarded a $150 million contract to supply PULS rocket launchers and a package of precision-guided long-range rockets to an international customer. The contract will be performed over a period of three years.
- Elbit Systems announced on 6 August 2024 that it was awarded a contract worth approximately $270 million to supply rocket artillery to an international customer. The contract will be performed over a period of 4 years.
- A $235 million deal to supply PULS launchers and 80 km (50 mi) range EXTRA MR missiles to an unnamed European country was announced by Elbit Systems on 19 October 2026. The deal would be carried out over 3 years. Some sources claimed the country in question was Azerbaijan.
- On 12 November 2026 Elbit Systems announced it was awarded a $260 million contract to supply PULS launchers and munitions to an unnamed European NATO member state. The contract is anticipated to complete over a 5 year period.

=== Future operators ===
Greece

- Hellenic Army – The Hellenic Army will acquire 36 systems of the European version, EURO PULS MLRS, in a deal of €650 ($750) million, signed in April 2026, with the construction of some of the components in Greece. The plan includes the acquisition of Accular, EXTRA, and primarily Predator Hawk rockets. The deal will also include SkyStriker UAV/loitering munitions, according to media reports from January 2025. The launchers will most-likely be vehicle-mounted on Iveco trucks, similar to the ones Germany used for the system. It will also integrate the RM-70 rockets already in service with the Hellenic Army.

Germany

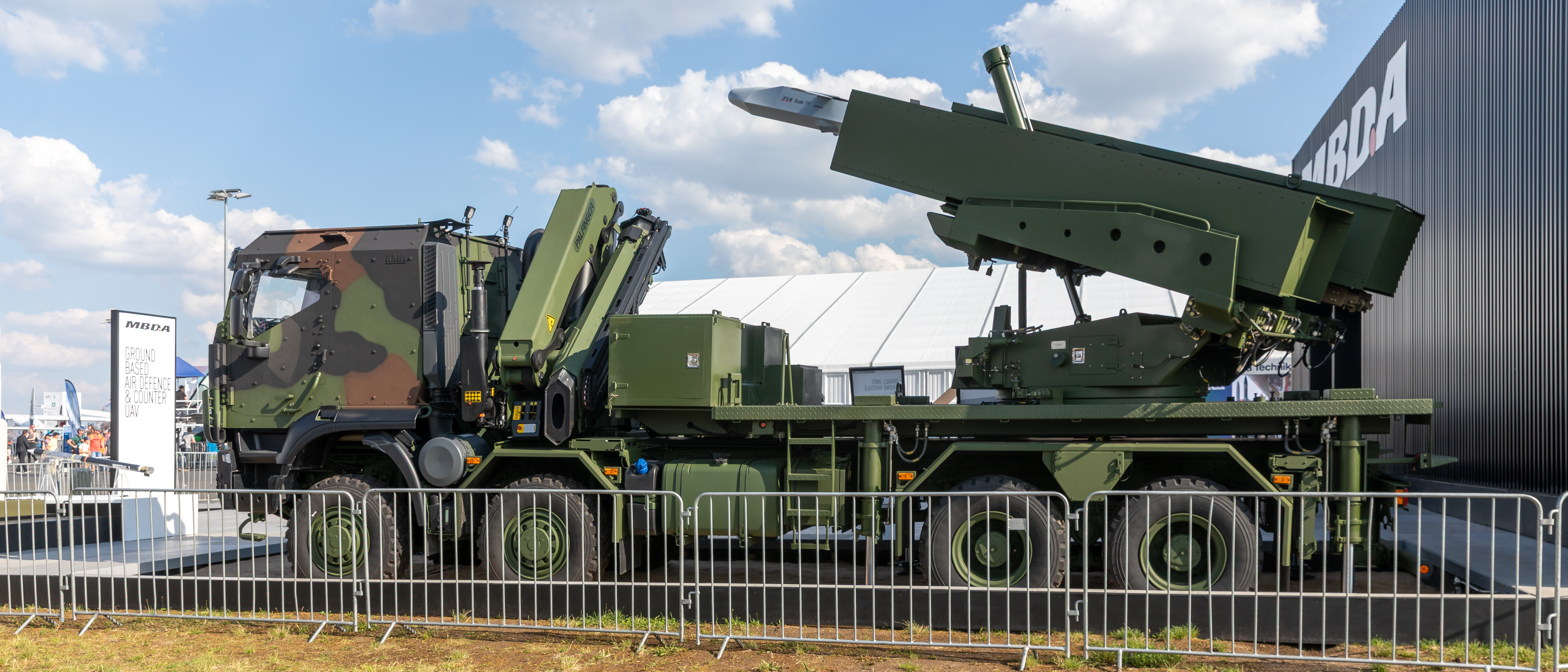
Mock-up of a EURO-PULS for the German Army

- German Army – The German government decided to buy five PULS systems in collaboration with the Netherlands to replace the five MARS II (M270 MLRS) sent to Ukraine. The purchase was approved by the parliament in December 2024. It is likely to be installed on an armoured Iveco Trakker FSA 8×8 (GTF ZLK 15t).

Peru

- Peruvian army - Selected in July 2025 to modernize Peruvian army's artilley capabilities in a deal that includes technology transfer and local production.

=== Potential operators ===
Austria

- According to the 2032+ reconstruction plan, Austria is planning to procure modern rocket artillery for the Austrian Armed Forces. Due to the political tensions with the USA in Europe, it is assumed that no US system will be purchased.

Bulgaria

- The Bulgarian Ministry of Defence has decided to forgo the M142 HIMARS due to its increased price and heavy demand and instead proceed with the PULS as the replacement for the OTR-21 Tochka.

Philippines

- Philippine Army – Actively competing against the American HIMARS and South Korean K239 Chunmoo systems for the MLRS Acquisition Project.

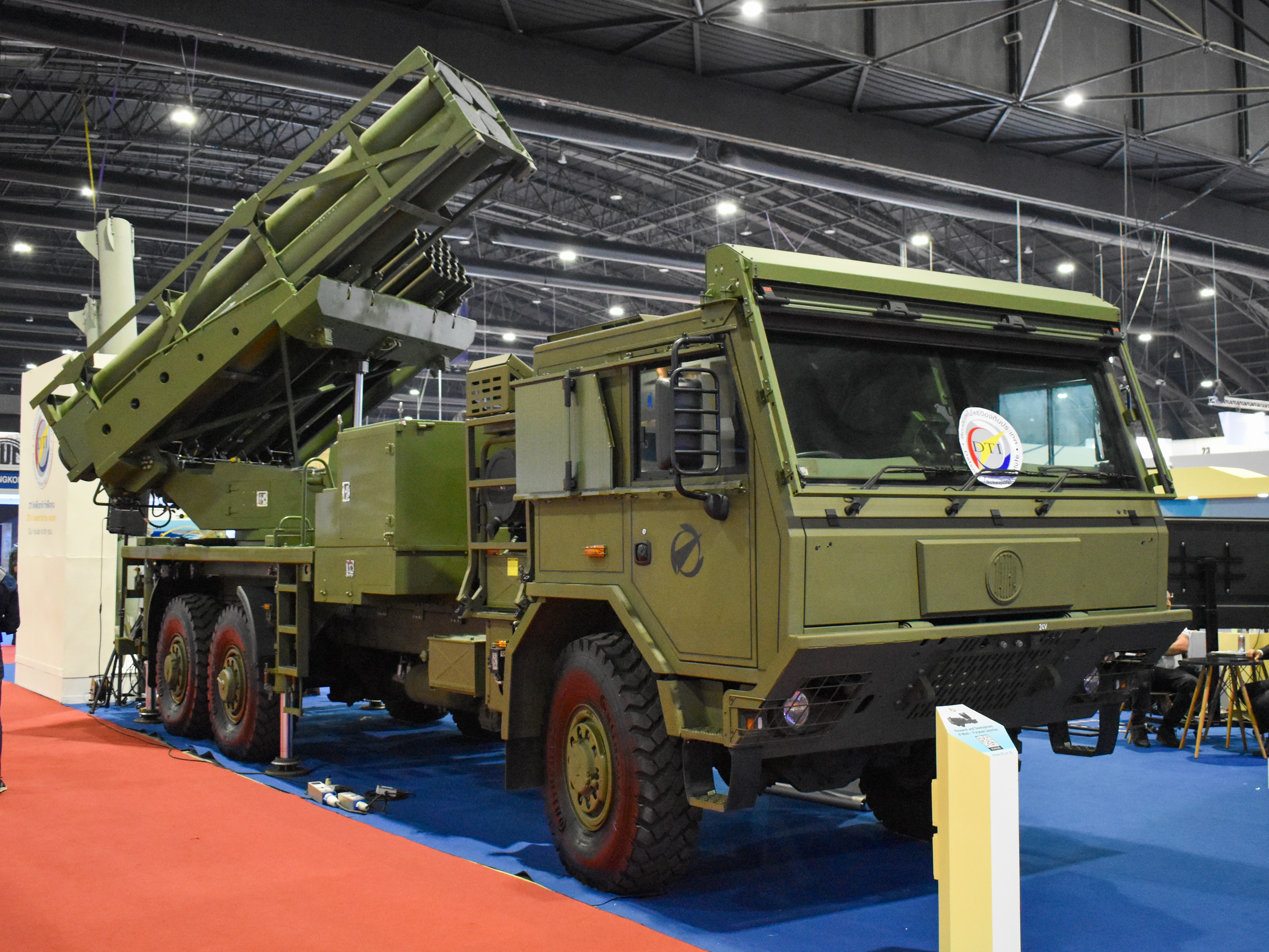
D-11A MLRS of the Royal Thai Army on a Tatra 815-7 chassis

Thailand

- Royal Thai Army – The RTA is testing a localized version of the PULS.

=== Cancelled ===
Spain

- Spanish Army – 16 PULS systems ordered in October 2023 for the SILAM MLRS ("Sistema Lanzador de Alta Movilidad") program for approximately €576.5 million. Contract cancelled in September 2025 due to the Gaza war.

== See also ==
- ACCULAR – (Israel)

=== Vehicle of similar era & design ===
- TOS-1 – (Soviet Union, Russia)
- 9A52-4 Tornado – (Russia)
- M270 MLRS – (United States)
- M142 HIMARS – (United States)
- K239 Chunmoo – (South Korea)
- Thunderbolt-2000 – (Taiwan)
- KN-09 – (North Korea)
- LRSVM Morava – (Serbia)
- T-122 Sakarya – (Turkey)
- Pinaka multi-barrel rocket launcher – (India)
- Astros II – (Brazil)
- Fajr-5 – (Iran)
- A-100 (multiple rocket launcher) – (China)
- PHL-03 – (China)
