= ACCULAR =

Israeli artillery rocket

AccuLAR-160
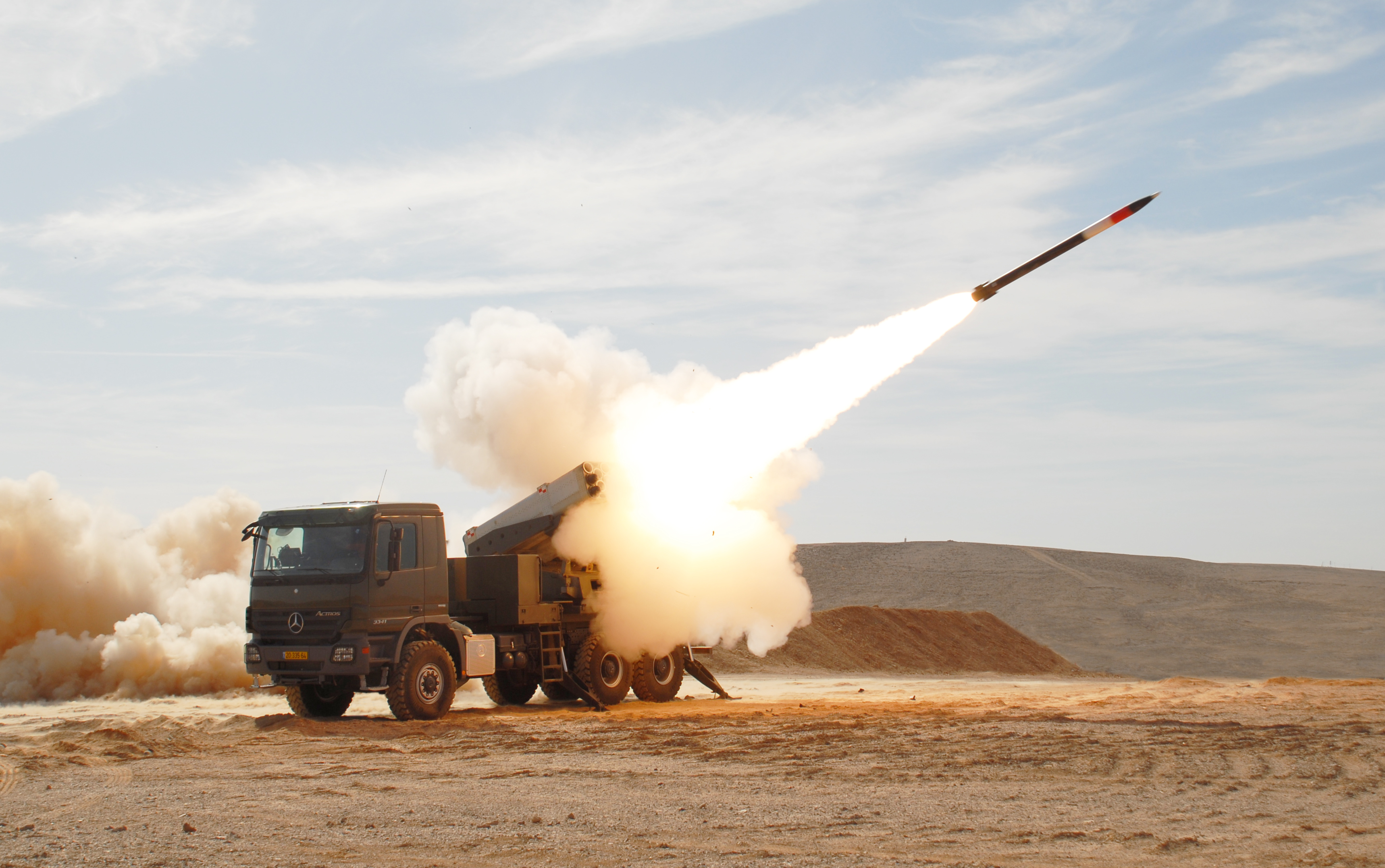
- AccuLAR-160 mm
- Type: Artillery rocket
- Place of origin: Israel

Production history
- Designer: Israel Military Industries

Specifications
- Caliber: 122–160 mm (4.8–6.3 in)
- Maximum firing range: 40 km
- Guidance system: global navigation satellite system (GNSS) / inertial navigation system (INS)

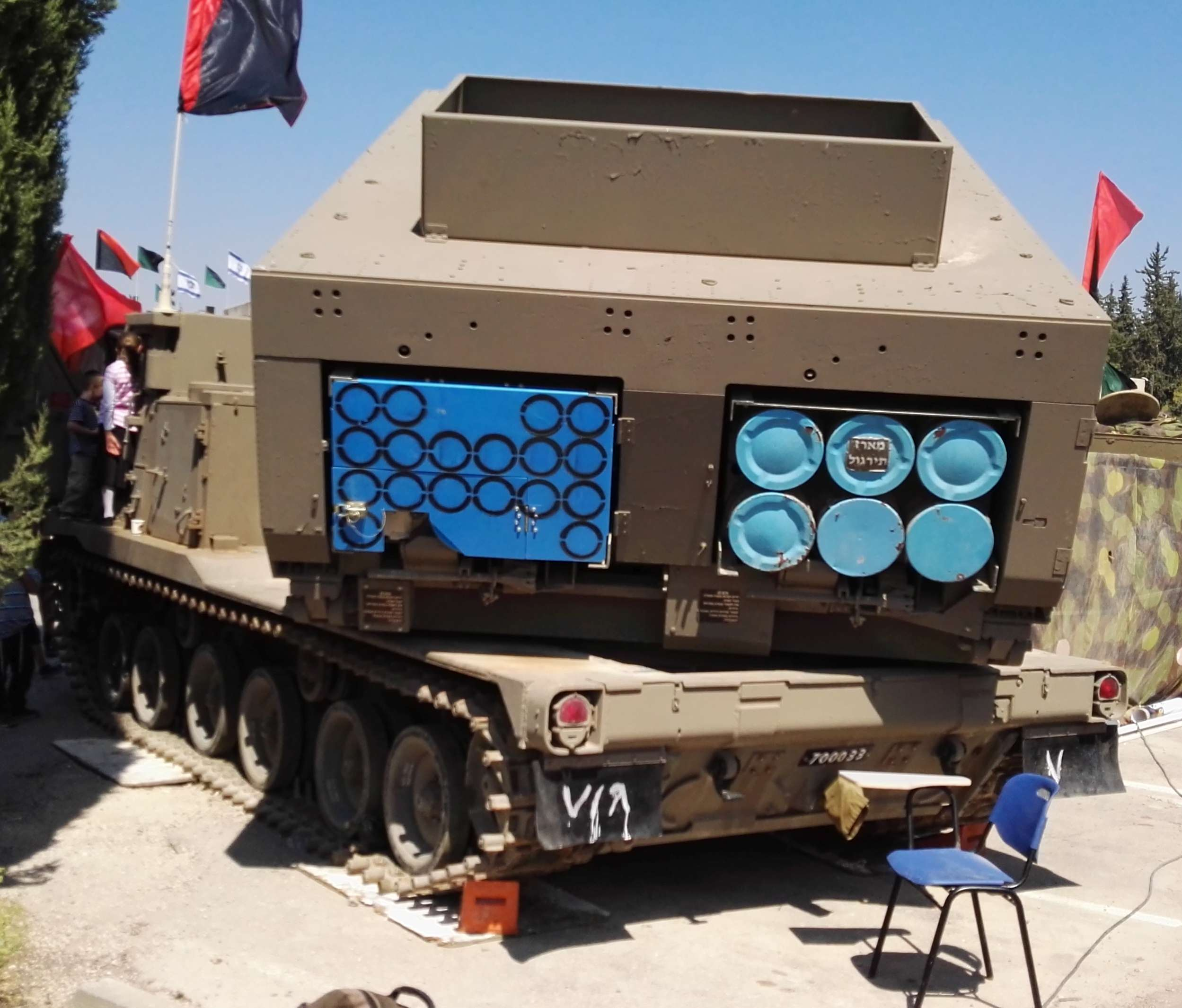
AccuLAR-122 'Romach' pod on the left, MLRS pod on the right, 'Menatetz' M270 launcher

ACCULAR is a family of artillery rockets developed and manufactured by Israel Military Industries (IMI) and used by Israel Defense Forces and international customers. It features 2 different calibers with a maximum range of 40 km with a 20–35 kg unitary penetration or controlled fragmentation warhead and accuracy of 10m CEP.

The ACCULAR missiles can be launched by IMI's LYNX (MRL) launcher, as well as from a variety of other available launchers.

== AccuLAR-160 ==
A guided version and further development of the unguided LAR-160.

== AccuLAR-122 ==
In service in IDF, under the name Romach, with dedicated M270 MLRS launchers. Each launcher can fire 18 rockets within a minute.

AccuLAR-122 can also be launched from IMI LYNX (MRL). It has a maximum range of 35 km and accuracy of 10m CEP.

== Operators ==
Israel: Used by Israel Defense Forces.

Greece: On order for the Hellenic Army. Reportedly 300 missiles.

== See also ==
- LAR-160 – (Israel)
- EXTRA – (Israel)
- Predator Hawk – (Israel)
