= MPR500 =

Israeli aerial bomb

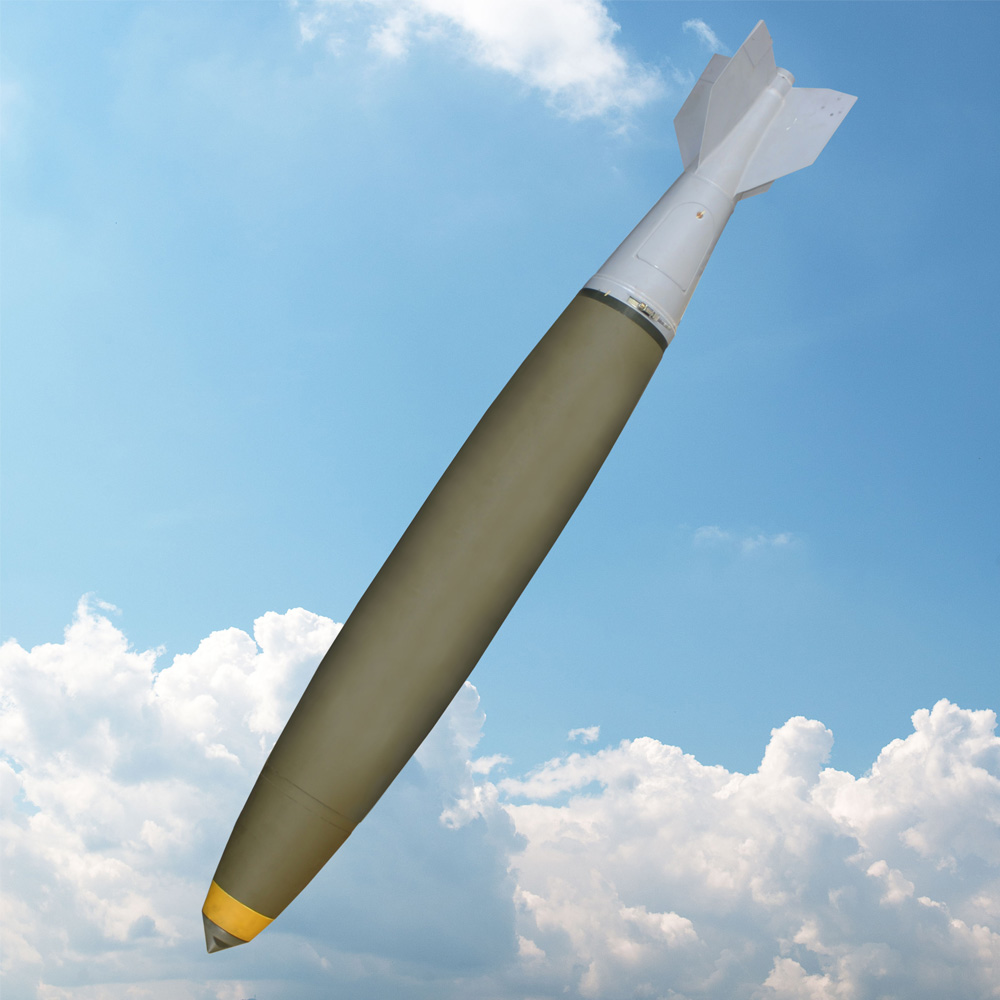
- Type: General-purpose bomb
- Place of origin: Israel

Service history
- In service: Since 2007
- Used by: Israeli Air Force

Production history
- Manufacturer: Elbit Systems (previously IMI Systems)
- Variants: GBU-12 Paveway II; GBU‐38 JDAM

Specifications
- Mass: 230 kg (510 lb)
- Length: 1.7 m (5 ft 7 in)
- Diameter: 273 mm (10.7 in)
- Tailspan: 390 mm (15 in)
- Warhead: HE
- Warhead weight: 89 kg (196 lb)
- Guidance system: GBU-12 Paveway II or GBU‐38 JDAM guidance kits
- References: Janes

MPR500 is a 500 lb (230 kg) Multi-Purpose Rigid penetration and surface attack bomb manufactured by Israel Military Industries. It has the effectiveness and dimensions of a Mark 84 bomb and can penetrate 1 meter reinforced concrete. Was approved by Boeing for the JDAM guidance kit. During Operation Protective Edge, the Israeli Air Force realized that the MPR provides 95% hitting and target destruction effectiveness.
