= Nora M-84 =

NORA M-84
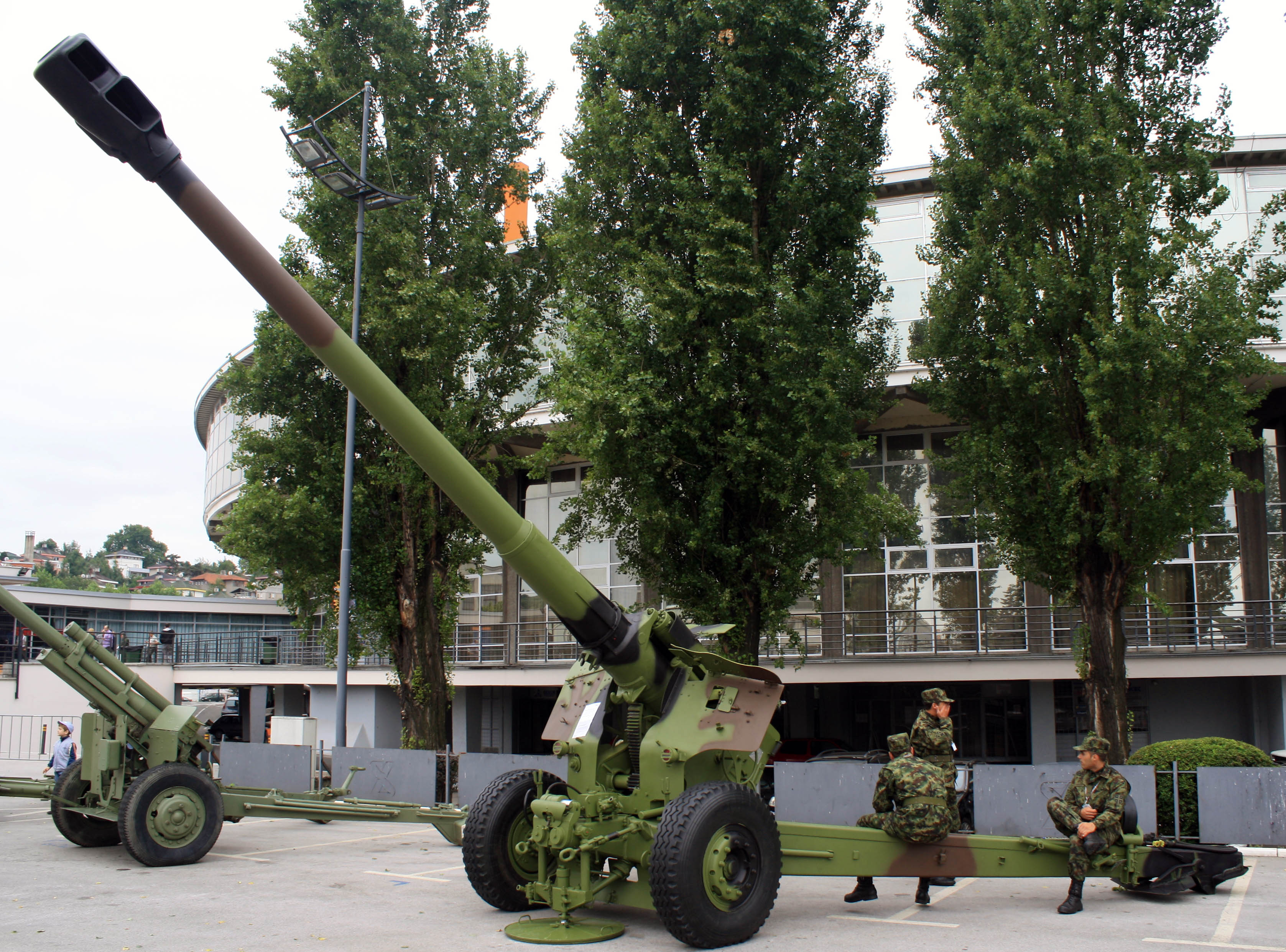
- Type: Towed gun-howitzer
- Place of origin: Yugoslavia

Service history
- Used by: See Operators
- Wars: Yugoslav Wars

Production history
- Designer: Military Technical Institute
- Designed: 1974–1980
- Manufacturer: Yugoimport SDPR, Serbia; BNT Novi Travnik, BiH
- Produced: 1984–present
- No. built: 88+
- Variants: NORA-A 152 mm; NORA-B 152 mm; NORA-C 152 mm; NORA-A1 155 mm; NORA M08 152 mm

Specifications
- Mass: 6880 kg or 7030 kg up to 7680 kg
- Length: 9.67 m (31 ft 9 in)
- Width: 5.73 m (18 ft 10 in)
- Height: 2.16 m (7 ft 1 in)
- Crew: 9
- Caliber: 152.4 mm (6 in)
- Breech: Vertical semi-automatic sliding wedge
- Recoil: hydraulic buffer and hydropneumatic recuperator
- Carriage: trail
- Elevation: -5° to 65°
- Traverse: 50°
- Rate of fire: Burst: 6 rpm (A1 version 8 rpm); Sustained: 4 rpm
- Muzzle velocity: 810 m/s
- Effective firing range: 24.0 km
- Maximum firing range: 34.5 km (base bleed M-84/GG)
- Sights: direct fire ×5.5 optical sight and ×3.7 panoramic sight

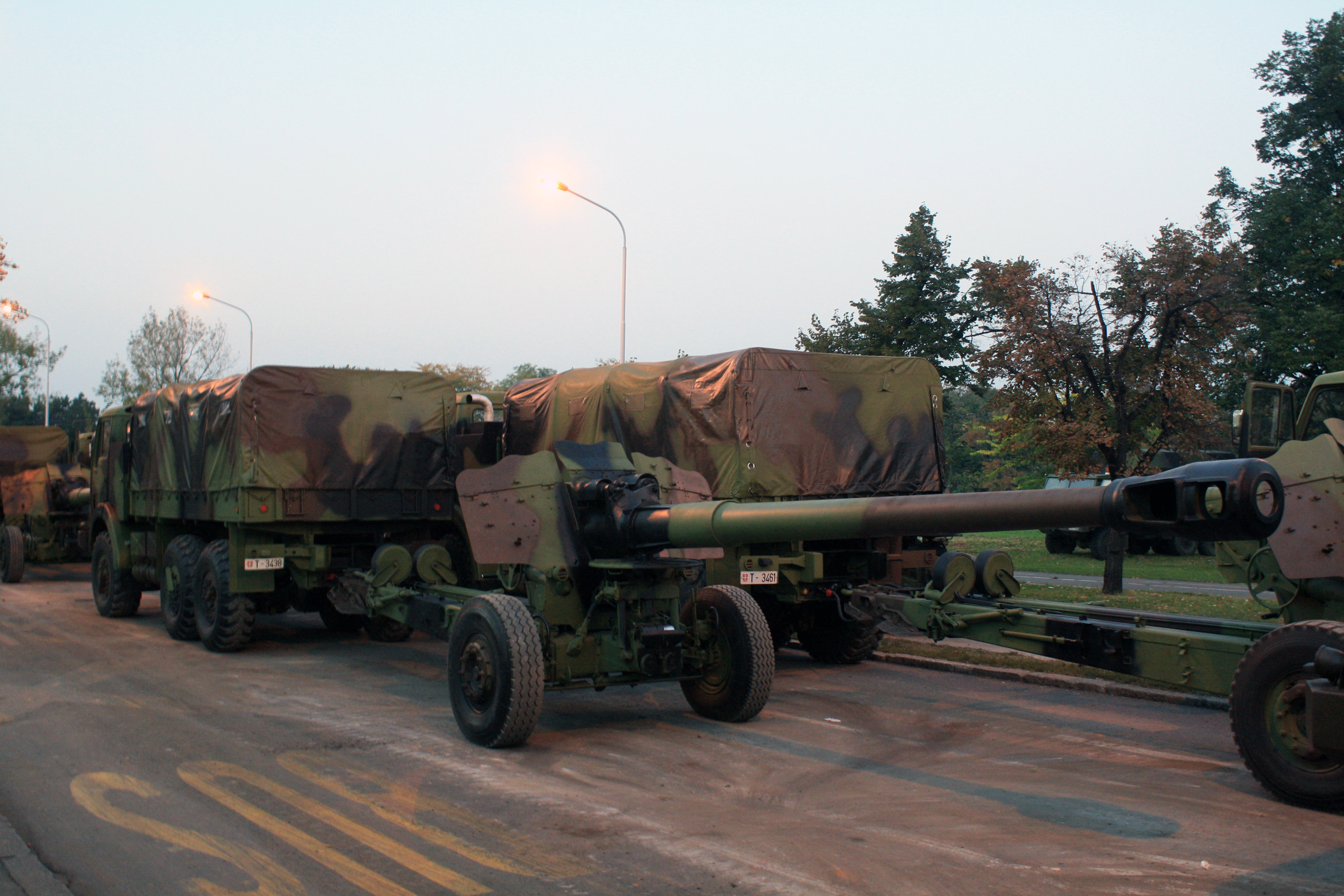
Serbian Army NORA 152 mm howitzer

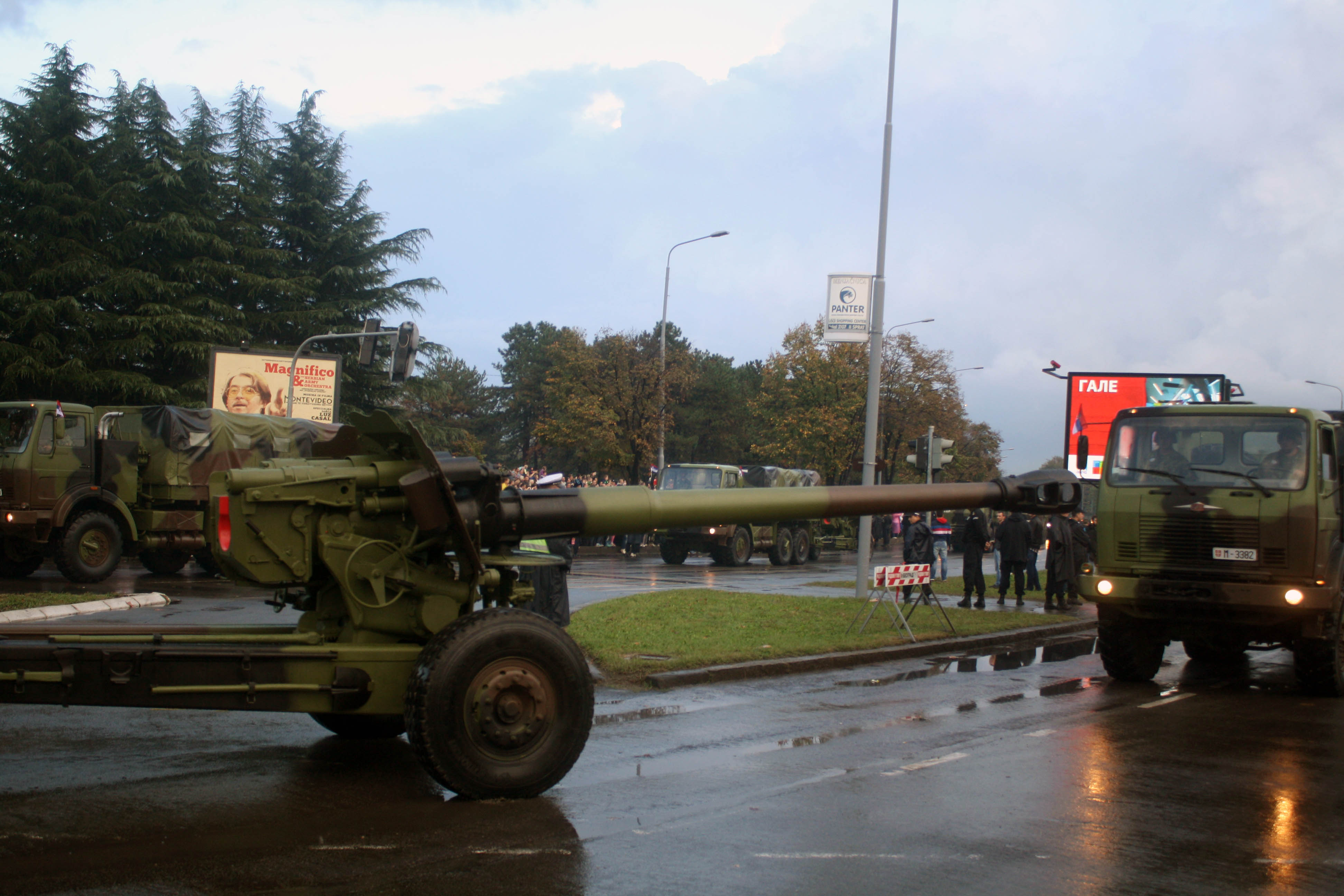
Serbian Army FAP 2026BS/AV 6x6 truck towing M-84 NORA-A 152 mm gun-howitzer

NORA M-84 (Serbian: Топ — хаубица НОРА, romanized: Top — haubica NORA; NORA acronymic for Serbian: Ново оруђе артиљерије, romanized: Novo oruđe artiljerije, lit. 'New Artillery Weapon tool') is a Yugoslav and Serbian 152 mm and 155 mm gun-howitzer developed by the Military Technical Institute for the Yugoslav People's Army and exports. Gun howitzer NORA has three basic versions (M-84, M-84B1, M-84B2), and is usually towed by a FAP 2026 BS/AV truck.

== Development ==
After producing domestic howitzer M65 155 mm based on the US M114 155 mm howitzer, the Yugoslav People's Army was not satisfied with the maximum range of that gun, and the other existing artillery weapons at disposal. Decisions were made to start domestic production of new large caliber guns. The construction documentation of 152 mm towed gun-howitzer M1955 (D-20) as well as several D-20 guns were bought from the Soviet Union. Dissatisfied with the range of both the US 155 mm and the Soviet 152 mm gun, and considering the lack of desired features, a number of specifications were defined with characteristics that a new domestic gun-howitzer should have:

- range with unassisted projectile of 24 km (155 mm howitzer M65 had range 14,9 km, and 152 mm gun D-20 had range of 17,4 km)
- new extended range ammunition (28 to 34.5 km)
- ability to fire all types of old ammunition for 152 mm gun D-20
- wider elevation range (from -5° to +65°)
- rate of fire of minimum 4, achieved by development of new semi-automatic wedge-type breach mechanism (155 mm howitzer М65 has rate of fire of only 1 to 2 rpm)

Three versions of NORA were designed:

- NORA-A 152 mm gun howitzer with 39-caliber barrel
- NORA-B 152 mm self-propelled gun with 45-caliber barrel based on FAP 2832 as carrier
- NORA-C 152 mm auxiliary power unit gun howitzer with 45-caliber barrel — parts of this project was planned to be used with a new 203 mm gun named "KOLOS" with a maximum range of more than 50 km that was not realized due to a lack of funds

Work on the NORA project began in 1975, and in May 1980, the first prototype of NORA-A was sent to the Technical Testing Center. In 1984, the development was completed and NORA-A, designated as M-84 NORA, was accepted by the Yugoslav People's Army. In 1989, the M-84 powder chamber was redesigned, the mass of the gun was reduced, and the gun was renamed M-84B1. The M-84B2 version is fitted with a pneumatic loader which is operational at all gun elevations, with a capacity of over 30 work cycles from one standard compressed air tank mounted on one of the trails.

Development of NORA-C was abandoned in 1991, and NORA-B suffered an almost similar fate. But after 2001, it was decided to continue the NORA-B project, and development was reactivated. In 2006, a new self-propelled gun with many new improvements and modifications was developed, known as NORA B-52. Today, the latest version, NORA B-52, has little similarities with the original NORA-B project, as the new system is much more modern and automated.

On the basis of the NORA M-84 development, a conversion of Soviet 130 mm towed field gun M1954 (M-46) to a bigger caliber was set. In 1986, it was accepted by the Yugoslav People's Army under the designation M-46/86 in 152 mm caliber. Another version for export, M46/86, with 155 mm gun caliber was developed.

Two more versions of NORA M-84 were developed after 2008:

- 155 mm / 39 cal. NORA-A1 light gun-howitzer
- M08 152 mm / 45 cal. towed gun

=== Ammunition ===
With the introduction of the gun, new munition was developed. In 1984, new ammunition with base-bleed was tested with a range of 34.5 km on NORA M84 152 mm. In 1986, serial production of ammunition started under the designation M84/ГГ. It has a maximum muzzle velocity of 895 meters per second, and was ahead of Soviet ammunition for 152 mm howitzer 2A65 at the time of introduction.

== Variants ==
There are several variants of NORA artillery systems now in use or offered for sales or export:

=== NORA M-84 ===
Basic variant that was accepted in the armament of the JNA in 1984. Small quantities are in use.

=== NORA M-84B1 ===
Variant with 18 liters redesigned powder chamber and reduced mass to 6.88 tones. Most used variant. Range 34.5 km.

=== NORA M-84B2 ===
Variant fitted with a pneumatic loader which is operational at all gun elevations, with the capacity to fire over 30 round.

=== M46/84 ===
Converted M-46 130 mm gun to NORA standard using 152 mm or 155 mm 45-caliber barrel and other parts developed through NORA program. In 155 mm M46/84 variant range of 39 km is achieved with ERFB/BB ammunition's with 2078 square meters lethal zone compared to 27 km standard range and 630 square meters lethal area for the original M-46 130 mm gun.

=== NORA A1 ===
Lightweight variant with 155 mm 39-caliber barrel and high rate of fire (8 rpm), new counter-recoil system and the possibility of use of semi-automatic loader.

=== M08 ===
M08 represents a further development of M46/84 gun and it is 152 mm gun with 45-caliber barrel having a range that is exceeding 40 km with new M05 155 mm projectile.

== Ammunition ==
152 mm NORA is capable to fire M84/GG projectile with a range of 34.5 km and all other ammunition developed for D-20 gun and NORA gun. NORA guns in the caliber of 155 mm are capable to fire all domestic and foreign counterpart ammunition developed for 155 mm guns within pressure allowed in chamber and barrel. The illumination round for NORA gun 152 mm is designated M88.

== Transportation and use ==
NORA gun-howitzer is transported by FAP-2026 or Kamaz 43118 6x6 cross-country trucks. From traveling into combat position and vice versa it takes about 3–5 minutes. A crew of 9 is needed to operate it successfully in combat within designed parameters.

== Operators ==
=== Current operators ===
Bosnia

- The Bosnian Army is equipped with 17 M-84 152 mm NORA.

Serbia

- The Serbian Army is equipped with 36 M-84 152 mm NORA; deployed in the Mixed Artillery Brigade.

=== Former operators ===
Yugoslavia

Croatia

- Croatian Army attained 21 M-84 152 mm NORA during the Croatian War of Independence, but system is incompatible with NATO requirements and therefore not in service with the army.

== See also ==
- FH70
- 152 mm howitzer 2A65
