= LAROM =

Romanian/Israeli multiple rocket launcher

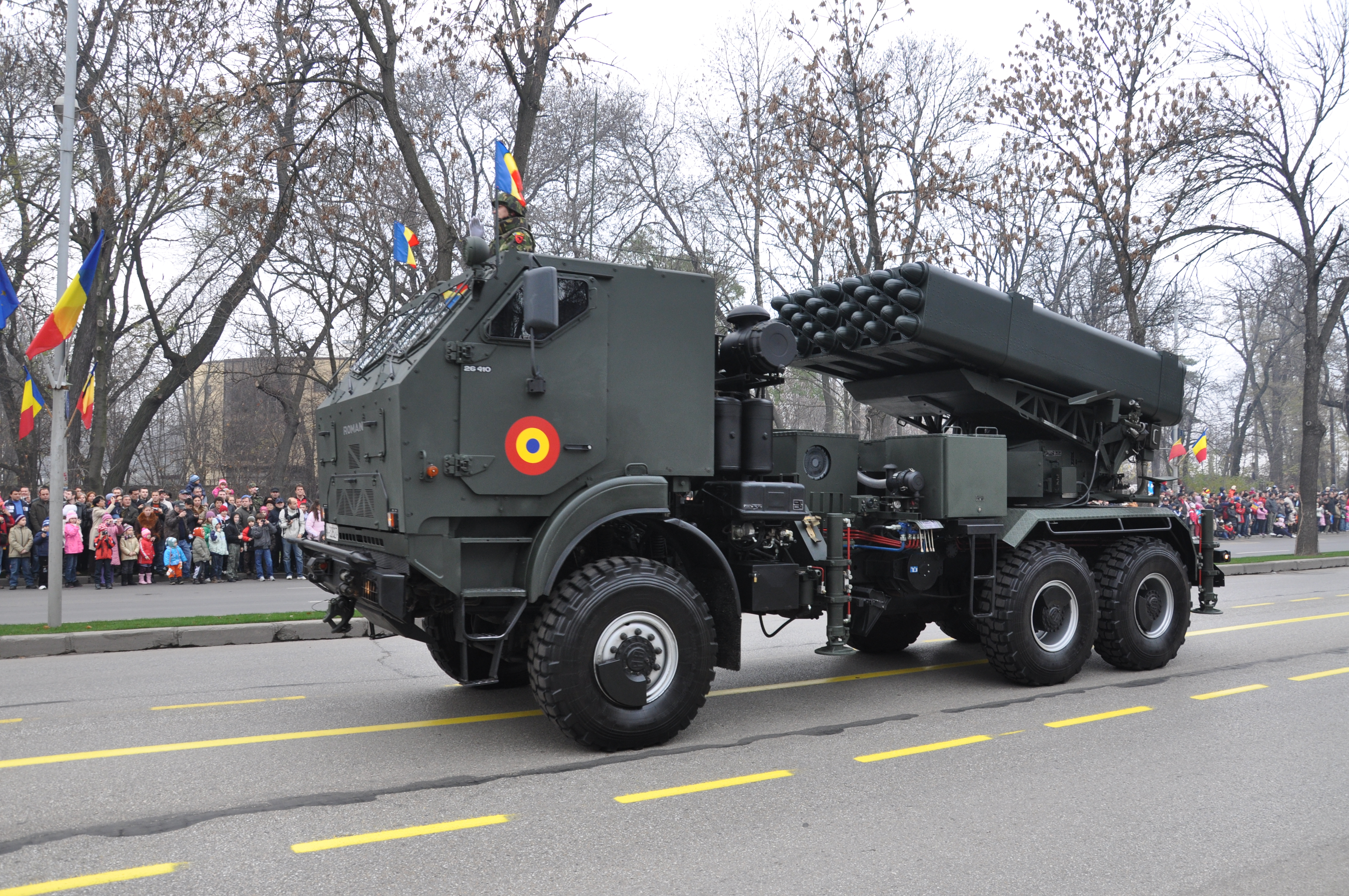
- LAROM MLRS at the 2009 National Day Parade
- Type: Multiple Rocket Launcher
- Place of origin: Romania, Israel

Service history
- In service: 2001 - present
- Used by: Romanian Land Forces

Production history
- Produced: 1999-
- No. built: 54

Specifications
- Mass: 13.7 tonnes
- Length: 7.35 m
- Width: 2.40 m
- Height: 3.10 m
- Crew: 4
- Main armament: 26×LAR Mk.4 160mm rockets or 40×122mm rockets
- Engine: 410 hp

The LAROM is a Romanian native-made, highly mobile, multiple rocket launcher, in service with the Romanian Land Forces, built in collaboration with Israel.

It was influenced by the BM-21 Grad 122 mm multiple rocket launcher (MRL) system which entered service with the Soviet Army in 1963 also utilizing a six-by-six truck chassis fitted with a bank of 40 122mm launch tubes arranged in a rectangular shape that can be turned away from the unprotected cabin.

== Armament ==
The LAROM standard launch pod containers hold 20 GRAD (122 mm) rockets or 13 LAR Mk. IV (160 mm) rockets, with two pods on a launcher.

The GRAD 122 mm rocket is utilised to suppress and annihilate concentrated targets. It has an 18 kg high-explosive warhead, a range of approximately 20 km and can be fired in salvos of up to 2 rounds per second.

The LAR Mk. IV 160 mm rockets employ composite solid propellants. The rocket is spin-stabilizing in flight via wraparound stabilizing fins deployed upon rocket exiting launcher. The Mk IV rocket is capable of taking various warheads and commonly fitted with either a HE-COFRAM type or a Cluster munition warhead. The cluster warhead operates by a remotely set electronic time-fuse which opens the bomblet canister at the calculated height to give area coverage of about 31,400 m^{2} for each cluster warhead. The LAR Mk IV has a minimum range of 10 km and maximum range of 45 km and can be fired in salvos of up to 1 round every 1.8 seconds.

== Operators ==
Romania − 54 modernized systems in service, all operated by the 8th Mixed Artillery Brigade.

== Gallery ==
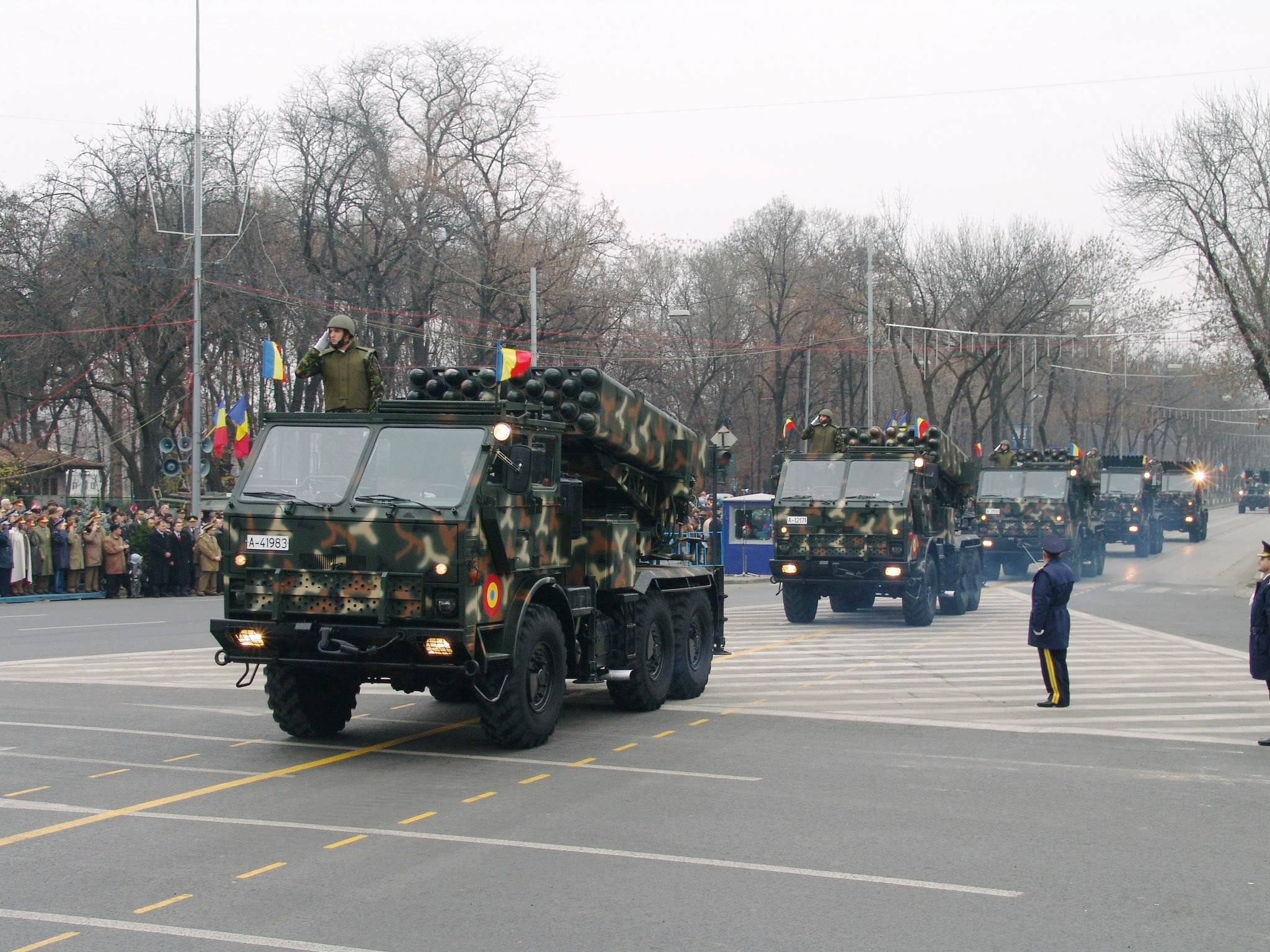
Older version of LAROM MLRS on DAC-665T chassis

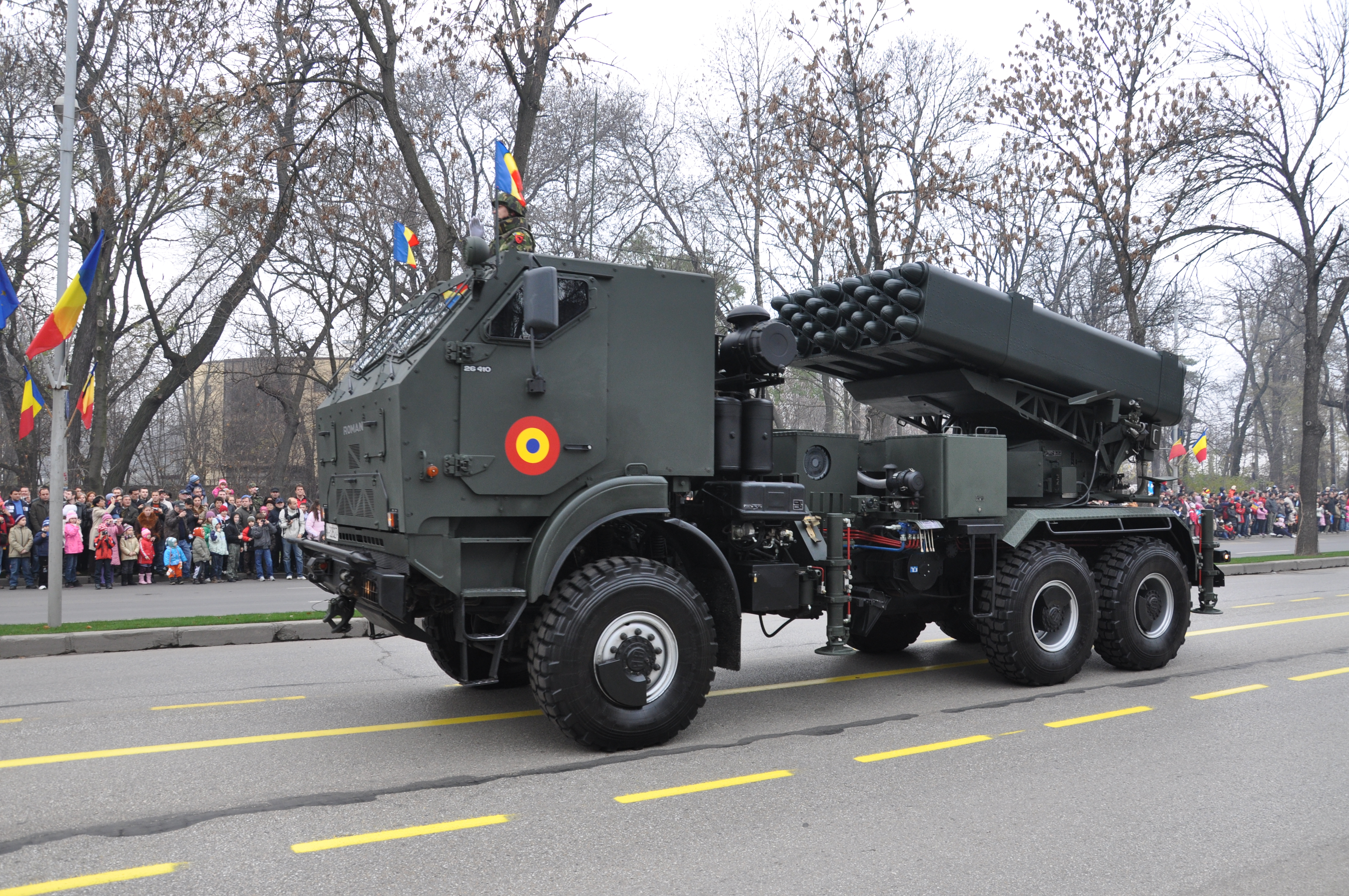
LAROM MLRS on ROMAN 26.410 chassis

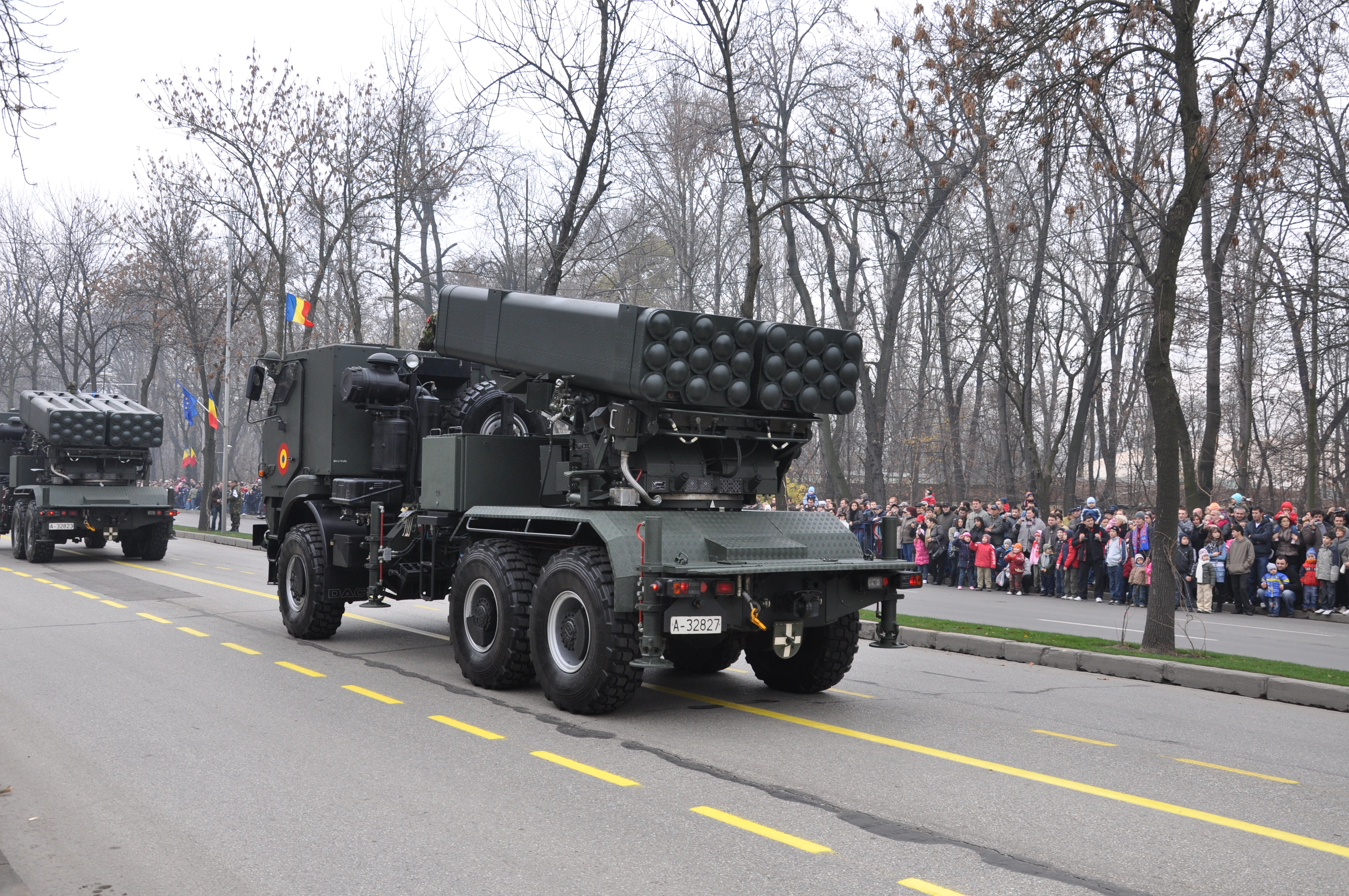
LAROM MLRS on ROMAN 26.410 chassis

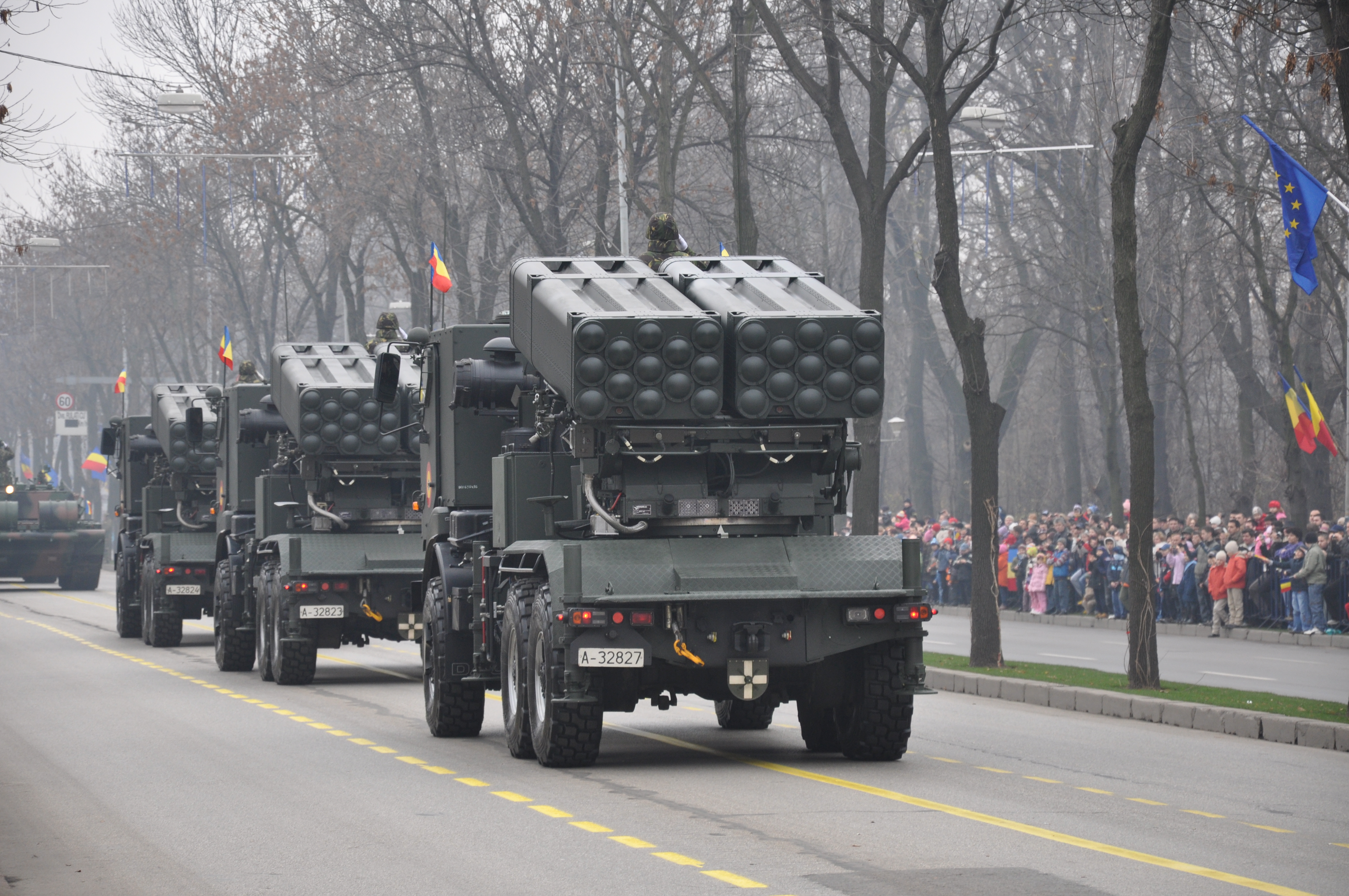
LAROM MLRS on ROMAN 26.410 chassis

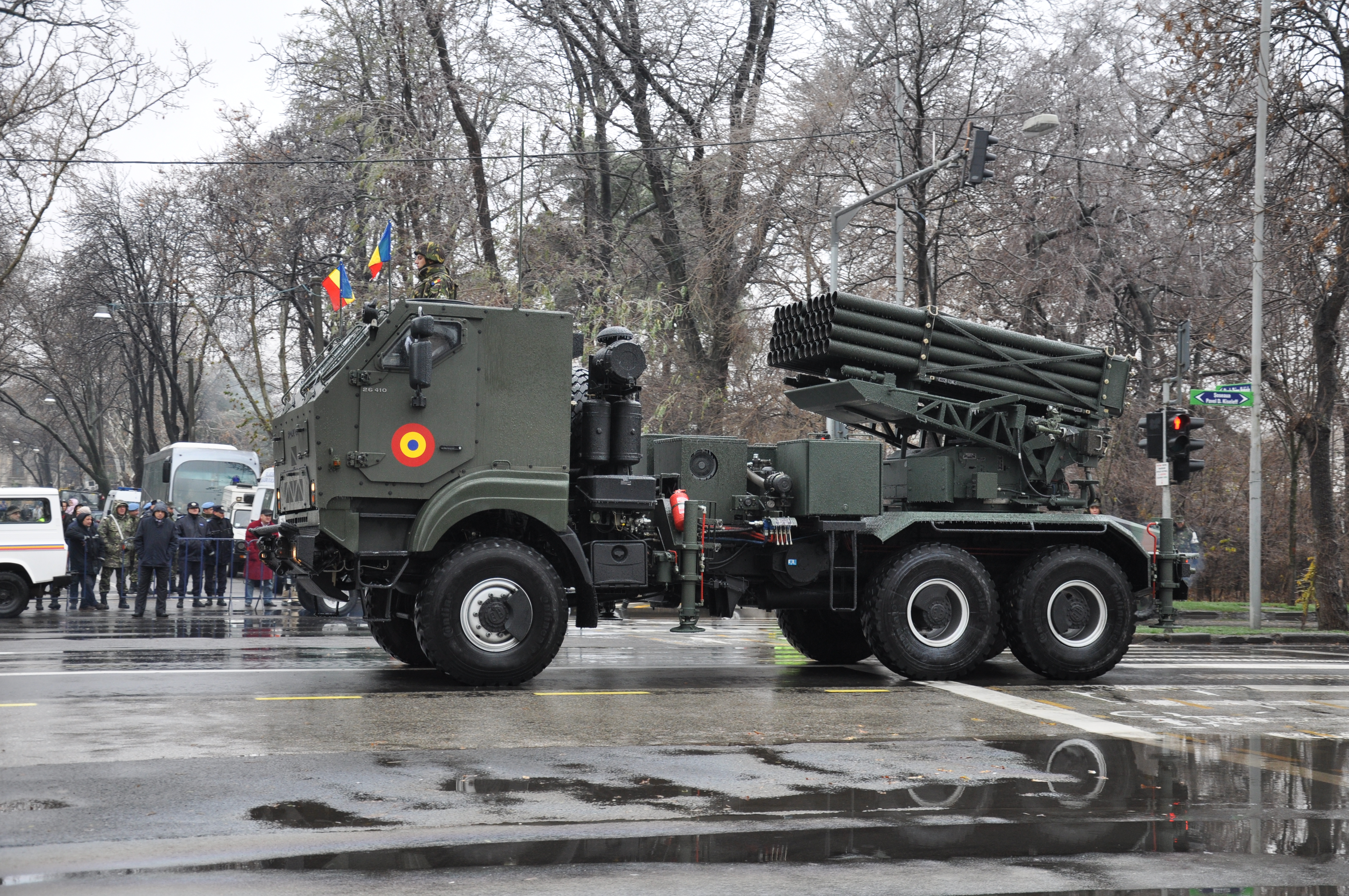
LAROM MLRS on ROMAN 26.410 chassis

== See also ==
- LAR-160 – (Israel)
- BM-21 Grad – (Soviet Union)
- RM-70 multiple rocket launcher – (Czechoslovakia)
- M-77 Oganj – (Yugoslavia)
- T-122 Sakarya – (Turkey)
