= Rampage (missile) =

Israeli air-to-surface missile

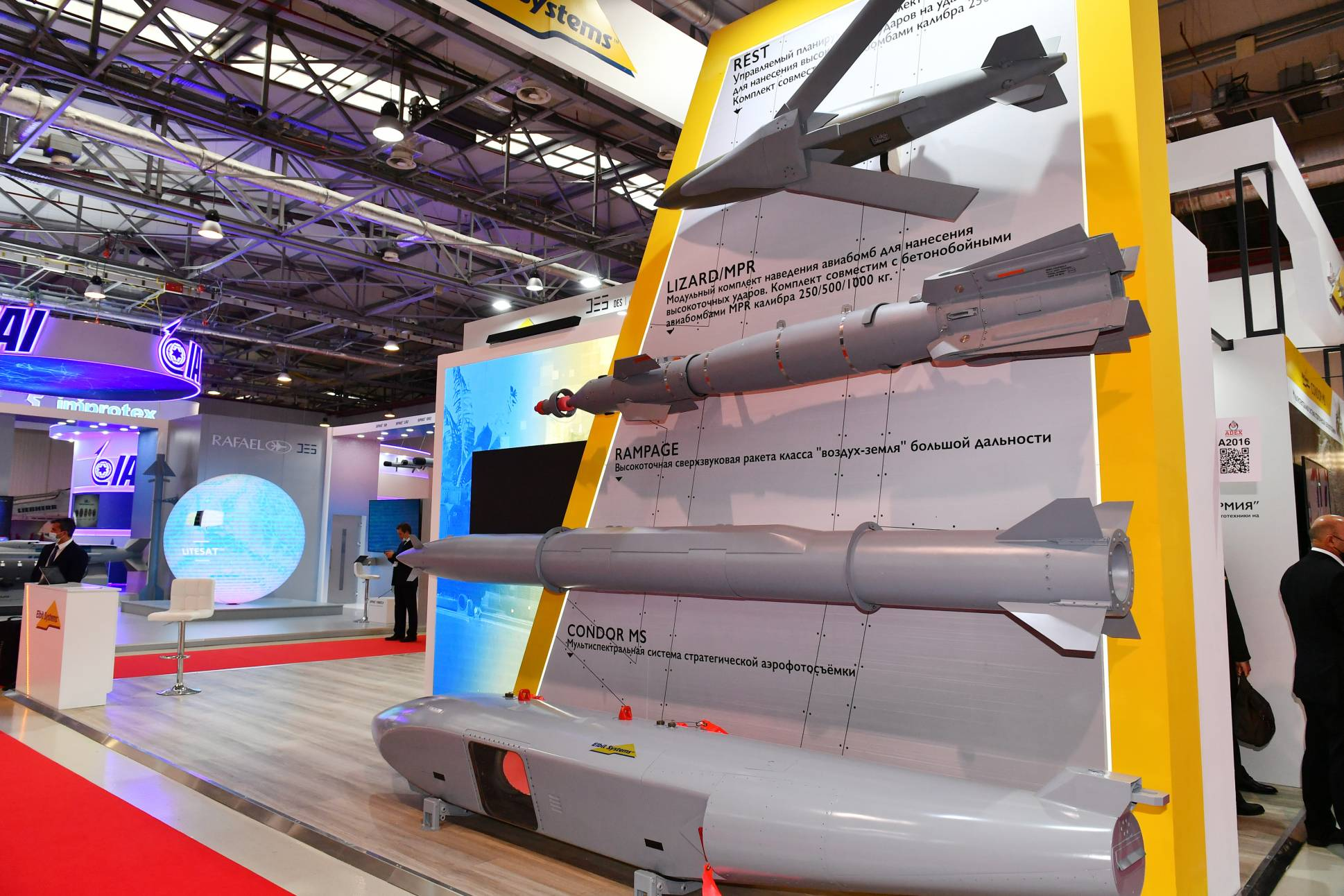
- The Rampage missile is the second from the bottom
- Place of origin: Israel

Service history
- Used by: Israeli Air Force; Indian Air Force; Indian Navy

Production history
- Designer: Elbit Systems, Israel Aerospace Industries

Specifications
- Mass: 570 kg (1,260 lb)
- Length: 4.7 m (15 ft)
- Diameter: 306 mm (1.004 ft)
- Warhead: Multi-EFP
- Warhead weight: 150 kg (330 lb)
- Detonation mechanism: Radio proximity fuze, Blast fragmentation
- Engine: Solid-propellant rocket
- Propellant: Solid fuel
- Operational range: 150–250 km (93–155 mi)
- Flight altitude: 3,000–40,000 ft (910–12,190 m)
- Maximum speed: 350–550 m/s (Mach 1.0 – Mach 1.6)
- Guidance system: INS + Altimeter + GPS + Two-way Datalink
- Accuracy: 10m CEP
- Launch platform: F-16, F-15, F/A-18E/F, Eurofighter Typhoon, IAI Kfir, Sukhoi Su-30MKI, SEPECAT Jaguar, MiG-29K

The Rampage, initially named MARS (Multi-purpose, Air-launched Rocket System), is an air-to-surface missile developed by Israel Military Industries and Israel Aerospace Industries (IAI) derived from the EXTRA. It is a standoff weapon designed to hit high-value targets such as radar installations, communications centers, weapons storage facilities and airfields.

== Operational history ==
The Rampage was officially unveiled in June 2018 and reportedly used for the first time in April 2019 in Syria. As of July 2023, the Royal Air Force is looking at using Rampage missiles after donating Storm Shadow missiles to Ukraine. Rampage missiles are believed to be cheaper than Storm Shadow missiles and are more readily available.

=== Israel ===
On 19 December 2024, the Israeli Air Force conducted airstrikes against the Houthis in Yemen with Rampage (mounted on F-16s) and the older Popeye (mounted on F-15s) missiles targeting ports and energy infrastructure at Sanaa.

Rampage was used by Israel in combat in the 2026 Iran war.

=== India ===
The Indian Armed Forces first acquired the Rampage missile in the wake of the 2020 Galwan clash.

On 7 May 2025, India conducted Operation Sindoor against Pakistan; the Indian Air Force said that it struck nine Pakistani sponsored militant camps across Pakistan in a coordinated, precision-led campaign causing extensive damage. Pakistani sponsored militant camps belonging to JeM and LeT in Bahawalpur and Muridke were extensively damaged using the Rampage missile as a part of the operation.

India used many Rampage missiles along with Brahmos and Storm Shadow on 10 May 2025, during Operation Sindoor continuation, where Indian Air Force Jaguar fighter bombers and Sukhoi Su-30MKI and MIG-29 fighters struck several Pakistani bases with the Rampage missile. The amount of damage is unknown as Sources did not reveal any meaningful information on the damage caused. Several Pakistani transport aircraft and hangars were hit, and many of these hits can be attributed to the Rampage. Following the conflict, the IAF has reportedly planned to acquire a larger fleet of the missile under a fast-track route. There is a possibility of the licensed production of the missile in India as well.

== Users ==
India

- Indian Air Force: Integrated with Sukhoi Su-30MKI, MiG-29 and Jaguar fighter jets.
- Indian Navy: Used on MiG-29K.

Israel:

- Operational missiles were showcased by the Israeli Air Force (IAF) on its official Twitter (X) page in October 2024, integrated on board an F-16I. Rampage was alleged to have been used during a Deep Strike Mission to eliminate the Deputy Commander of Hezbollah's Radwan Forces, Mustafa Ahmad Shahdi.
- Operational missiles were showcased by the Israeli Air Force (IAF) and IDF Spokesperson, in December 2024, integrated onboard F-16I, as part of preparations for Israel's attack on Yemen's Sana'a Airport.

== See also ==
- Air LORA
- SkySniper
