= LAR-160 =

Israeli multiple rocket launcher

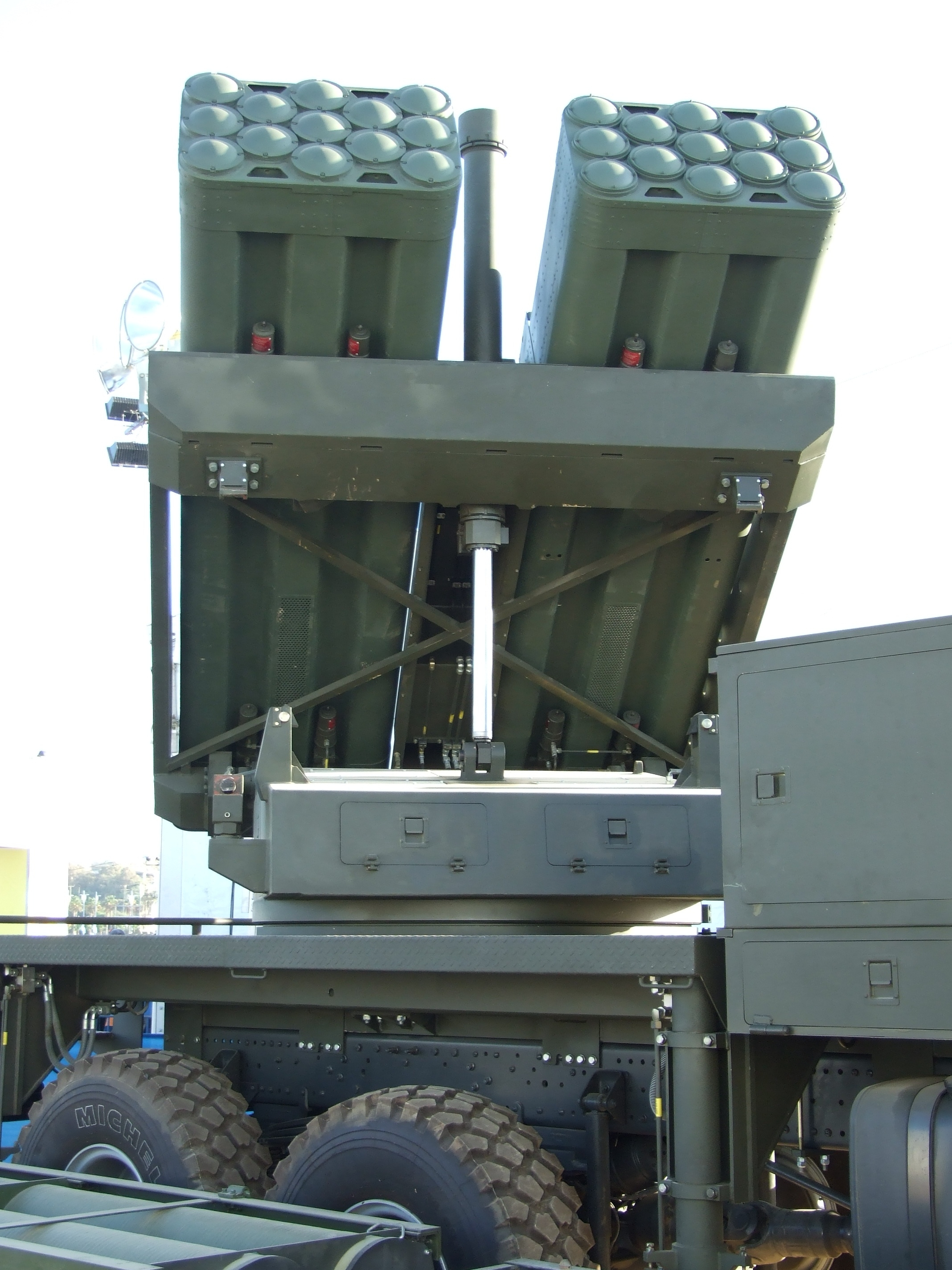
- LAR-160 multiple rocket launcher mounted on a LYNX (MRL)
- Type: Multiple rocket launcher
- Place of origin: Israel

Service history
- Used by: Israel; Argentina; Azerbaijan; Georgia; Kazakhstan; Romania; Venezuela; Chile
- Wars: Russo-Georgian War; 2020 Nagorno-Karabakh war

Production history
- Manufacturer: Israel Military Industries

Specifications
- Mass: 100kg Mk.I, 110kg Mk.II
- Length: 3.4m
- Diameter: 160mm
- Detonation mechanism: Impact fuze or Proximity fuze
- Operational range: 45km
- Guidance system: ACCULAR – 2003 onwards
- Launch platform: Mobile (many including AMX-13 and HMMWV)

The LAR-160 is a light artillery rocket (hence LAR) with a 160mm calibre, a minimum range of 12 km and a maximum range of 45 km, from a multiple rocket launcher. Each standard launcher holds two 13 rocket Launch Pod Containers (LPC's) for truck or trailer mounting, 18 rocket LPC's for medium armored vehicle's (AMX-13, TAM) and 26 rocket LPC's for mounting on a MBT chassis. A light version is also manufactured which can be carried by helicopters and towed behind vehicles such as a HMMWV.

== Development ==
The LAR-160 was designed in the late 1970s by Israel Military Industries, it was adopted by the Israeli Defense Forces in 1983.

== Armament ==
The LAR-160s rocket has undergone continuous development and has resulted in the Mk. I, Mk. II and Mk.IV rockets.

=== Mk. I Rocket ===
The Mk. I rocket is 3.4 m long and has a diameter of 160 mm fueled by solid propellant. The Mk. I is 100 kg and has a 40 kg HE-COFRAM (High Explosive-Controlled Fragmentation) warhead which is activated by an impact fuze or proximity fuze. The Mk. 1 was first used by the Venezuelan Army on an AMX-13 hull.

=== Mk. II Rocket ===
The Mk. II rocket weighs 110 kg and has a 46 kg warhead which is either HE-COFRAM or a cluster warhead containing 104 CL-3022-S4 AP/AM submunitions. A remotely set electronic fuze opens the canister at the appropriate height to give area coverage of about 31,400 m2.

All 26 rockets can be fired in under 60 seconds and re-loaded in under five minutes from a conventional truck with a 15 t/m crane.

== Launcher ==
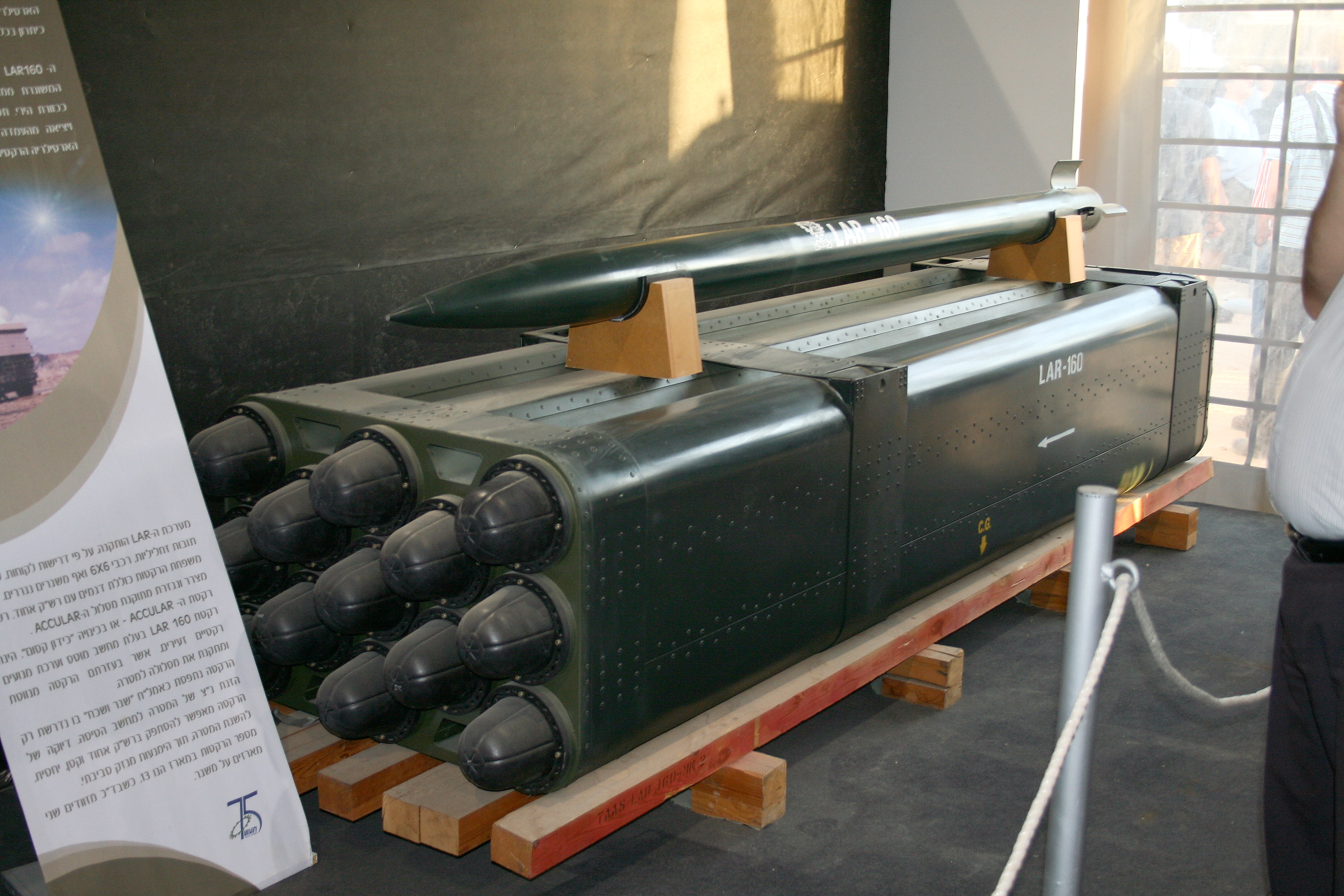
Detached LAR-160 multiple rocket launcher

The LAR-160 incorporates a modern command, control, communications and intelligence system called ACCS, which has a total interface capability to all common artillery elements including meteorological unit, forward observers as well as mapping, GPS and other items.

Elevation and traverse of the launchers are performed by an electrohydraulic system, which is backed up by a manual system. When the system is fitted on a wheeled chassis, two hydraulically operated stabilisers are lowered to the ground to provide a more stable firing platform.

== Service history ==
The system was used extensively by the Georgian Army against Russian and South Ossetian Forces in the 2008 Russo-Georgian War, systems showed to be extremely effective against Ossetian static targets and large Russian convoys, LAR systems were credited with destroying many Russian trucks and disabling armored vehicles.

Romania uses a domestic version of the LAR-160, called LAROM and Argentina uses a domestic version as well called TAM VCLC.

The HALO Trust reported that Azerbaijan employed the LAR-160 to drop M095 rocket-dispensed cluster bombs around Armenian-populated settlements in the Republic of Nagorno-Karabakh during the 2016 Armenian–Azerbaijani clashes.

The Human Rights Watch verified Azerbaijani multiple usage of the LAR-160 to drop M095 rocket-dispensed cluster bombs against populated settlements in Nagorno-Karabakh in October 2020.

== Operators ==
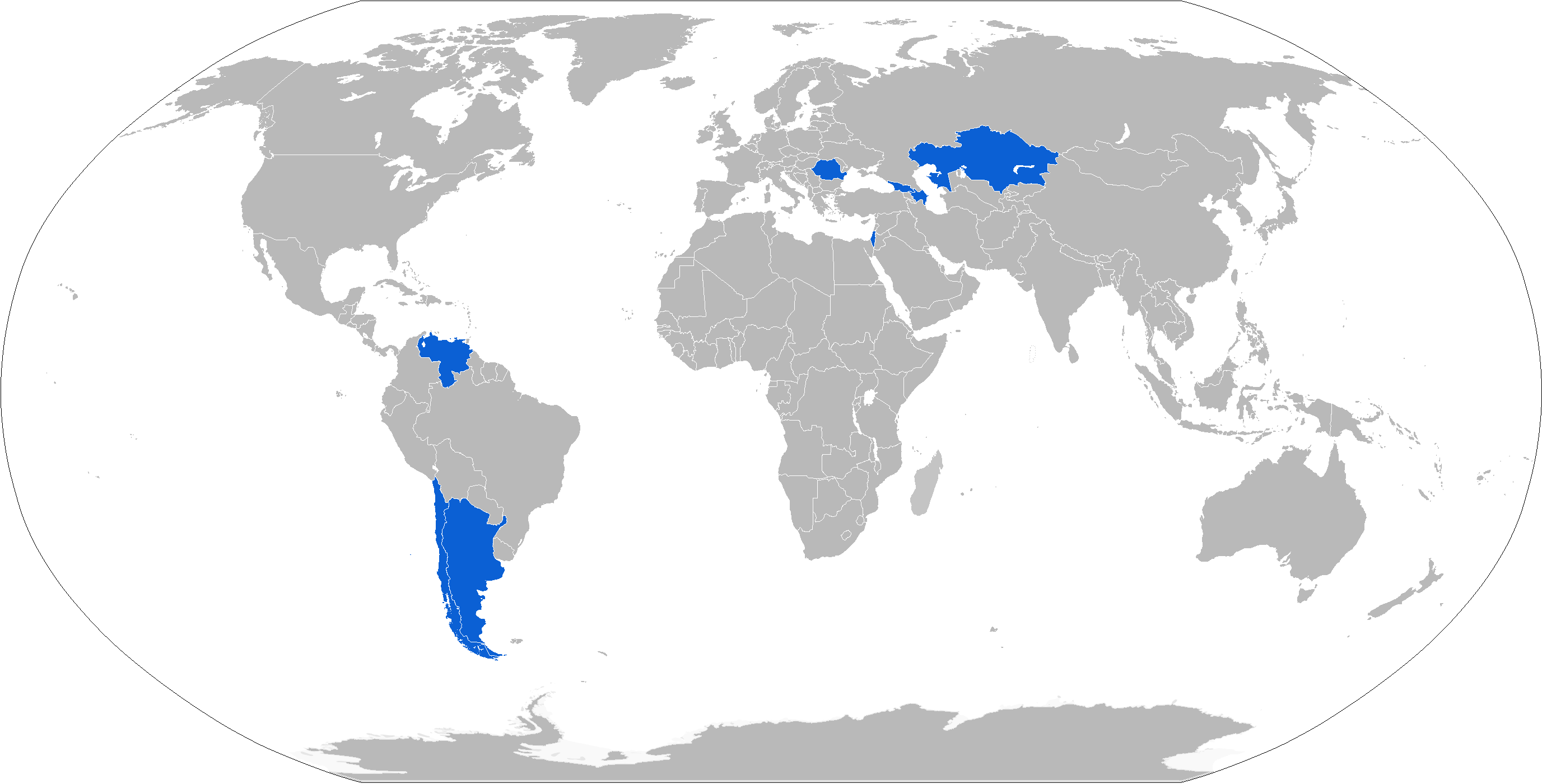
Map with LAR-160 operators in blue

- Argentina – 1 (TAM VCLC version)
- Azerbaijan – 30
- Chile – 10
- Georgia – 12 Delivered from Israel in 2007.
- Israel – (ACCULAR-122 version on MLRS hull)
- Kazakhstan
- Romania – (LAROM Version)
- Venezuela – 20 (mounted on AMX-13 hull)

== See also ==
- ACCULAR – (Israel)
- EXTRA – (Israel)
- Predator Hawk – (Israel)
