= Predator Hawk =

Israeli short-range ballistic missile

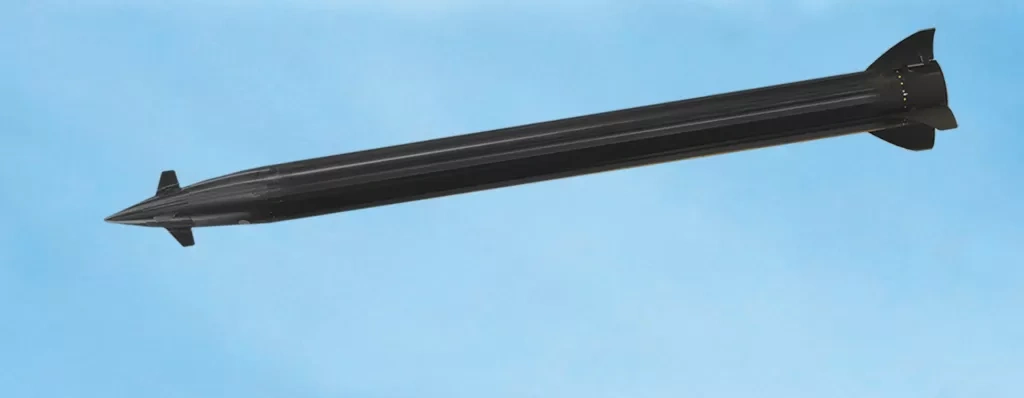
- Type: Rocket artillery Tactical ballistic missile
- Place of origin: Israel

Service history
- In service: 2016 – present

Production history
- Designed: 2014
- Produced: 2014 – present
- No. built: 700+

Specifications
- Mass: 800kg
- Length: 5 meter
- Diameter: 370 mm (15 in)
- Maximum firing range: 300 km
- Guidance system: GPS, GLONASS / inertial navigation system (INS)

Predator Hawk is a tactical ballistic missile system developed and manufactured by Israel Military Industries (IMI) and used by Israel Defense Forces. It has a maximum range of 300 km with a 140 kg unitary warhead and accuracy of 10 m CEP.

The missile is sealed in a Launch Pod Container (LPC), with each LPC contains 2 missiles. The Predator Hawk missiles can be launched by a PULS launcher on an 8×8 vehicle, as well as from a variety of other available launchers.

== Operator ==
Israel: Used by Israel Defense Forces.

Greece: On order for the Hellenic Army. Reportedly 120 missiles.

== See also ==
- Abdali-I – (Pakistan)
- ACCULAR – (Israel)
- MGM-140 ATACMS – (United States)
- al-Husayn – (Iraq)
- B-611 – (China)
- Burkan-1 – (Yemen)
- DF-11 – (China)
- EXTRA – (Israel)
- Fateh-313 – (Iran)
- Ghaznavi – (Pakistan)
- J-600T Yıldırım – (Turkey)
- LAR-160 – (Israel)
- LORA (missile) – (Israel)
- Pralay (missile) – (India)
- Qiam 1 – (Iran)
- Shaheen-I – (Pakistan)
- Sky Spear – (Taiwan)
- Ure (missile) – (South Korea)
