= IMI Systems =

Israeli defense manufacturer

IMI Systems Ltd.
- Native name: Hebrew: תעש מערכות בע"מ
- Formerly: Israel Military Industries
- Type: State-owned enterprise
- Industry: Arms industry
- Founded: 1933; 93 years ago
- Defunct: 25 November 2018
- Fate: Acquired by Elbit Systems
- Successor: Elbit Systems Land; Israel Weapon Industries
- Headquarters: Ramat HaSharon, Tel Aviv, Israel
- Area served: Worldwide
- Key people: Yitzhak Aharonovich (Chairman); Avi Felder (President and CEO)
- Products: Weapons, combat vehicles, munitions
- Owner: Government of Israel
- Divisions: Fire Power Division; Maneuverability Division; Small Caliber Ammunition Division
- Subsidiaries: Ashot Ashkelon Industries; IMI Trading; IMI Services; IMI Academy
- Website: www.imisystems.com (Shutdown)

IMI Systems, previously Israel Military Industries, also referred to as Ta'as (Hebrew: תע"ש מערכות ,התעשייה הצבאית), was an Israeli weapons manufacturer. The company manufactured weapons, munitions and military technology mainly for the Israeli security forces (especially the Israel Defense Forces).

On 25 November 2018, Elbit Systems completed the acquisition of IMI Systems and renamed it to Elbit Systems Land.

The historical logo of IMI Systems until January 2016

== Small arms ==
Manufacturing gun barrels in an IMI factory, 1955

Israel Weapon Industries' small arms offerings are notable, with numerous well identified product names and de facto 'brands'. Examples are the Uzi submachine gun, the IMI Galil assault rifle, and the Negev light machine gun. In addition, such offerings as the Jericho 941 semi-automatic pistol and Tavor assault rifle are globally recognized and marketed firearms.

In the 1980s, an American firearms designer, Magnum Research, contracted IMI to re-design and manufacture a magnum caliber (.44 Magnum, .357 Magnum and .50 AE), resulting in the production of a semi-automatic pistol marketed as the Desert Eagle.

In 2005, Israel Military Industries sold its Magen division (Small Arms Division) to Israeli privately owned holding company SK Group and renamed Israel Weapon Industries.

== Products ==
=== Vehicles ===
- Wildcat APC MRAP
- COMBATGUARD armored combat vehicle

=== Rifles ===
- Romat
- Galil ACE
- Galil
- Tavor
- Tavor X95
- Arad

=== Machine guns/pistols ===
- Negev
- Uzi

=== Semi-automatic pistols ===
- Jericho 941
- SP-21 Barak
- IMI Desert Eagle

=== Missiles and launchers ===
- MAPATS
- Delilah
- MARS
- MAR-290
- LAR-160
- Romach
- ACCULAR
- EXTRA
- Predator Hawk
- MSOV

=== Tank guns ===
- IMI 120 mm gun – Tank Gun

=== Bombs and grenades ===
- FASTLIGHT
- MPR500
- Refaim bullet-trap rifle-grenade

=== Cluster munition ===
IMI produced, license-produced and exported cluster munition in the form of artillery projectiles, mortar bombs and rockets.

=== Accessories ===
- CornerShot and related attachments

=== Armor add-ons ===
- Armor plating coat
- Explosive reactive armour
- Tractor protection kit (TPK) for Caterpillar D7
- Armor kit for Caterpillar D9 bulldozer (L\N)
- Iron Fist active protection system - Active protection system (APS)

== Metropolitan College of New York ==
Israel Military Industries also has a partnership with the Metropolitan College of New York (MCNY) in New York City. Metropolitan College of New York offers a classroom based Master's In Public Administration in Emergency Management and Homeland Security. In addition, all students go to Israel for an intensive study abroad seminar covering Homeland Security and Anti-Terrorism topics with Israel's top security and military experts.

== See also ==
- Israel Weapon Industries
- Ashot Ashkelon
- Military equipment of Israel
