= EXTRA artillery rocket system =

Israeli artillery rocket

EXTRA Extended Range Artillery
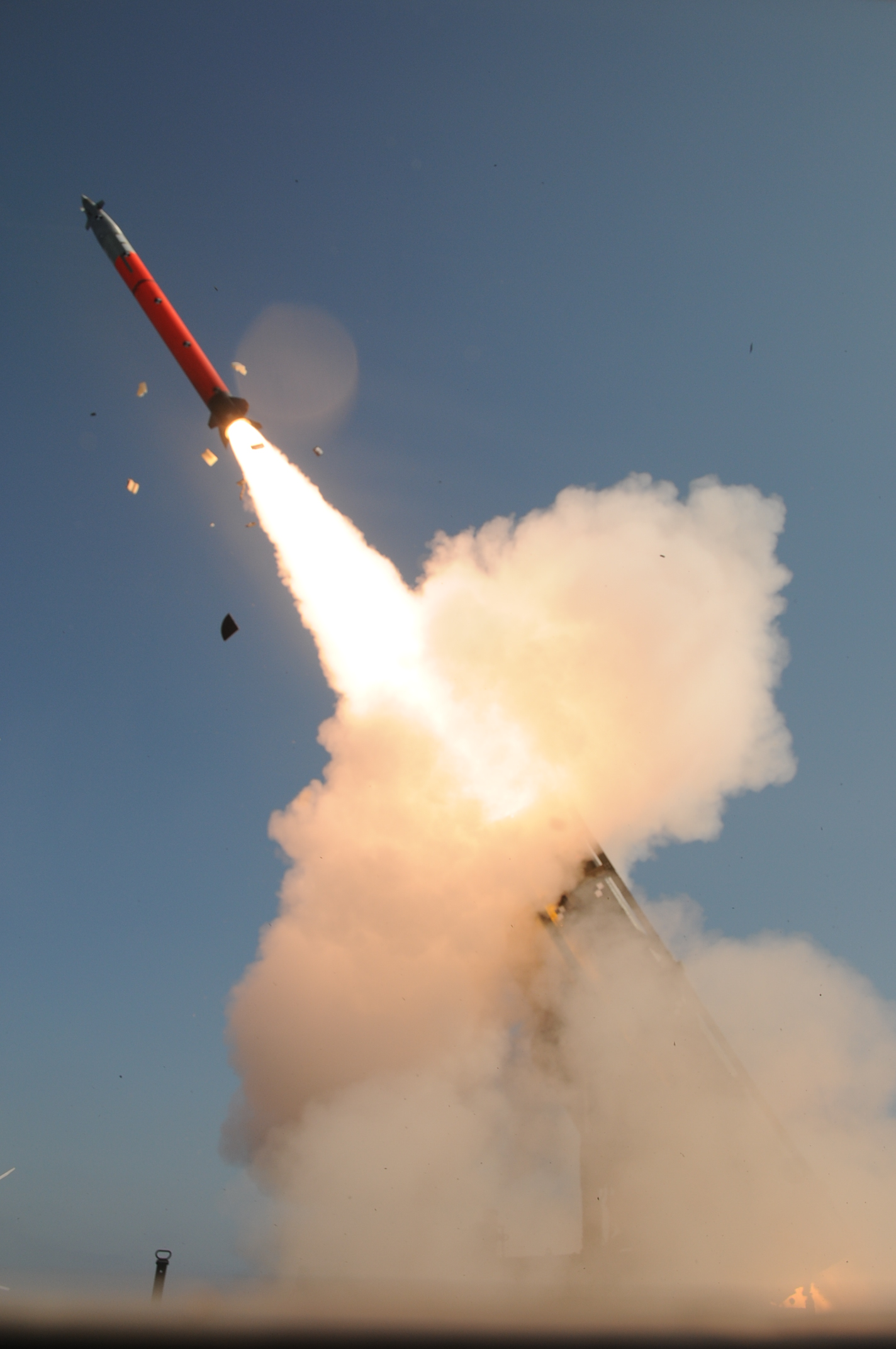
- EXTRA flight test
- Type: Artillery rocket
- Place of origin: Israel

Service history
- In service: 2016 – present
- Wars: 2020 Nagorno-Karabakh conflict

Production history
- Designed: 2014
- Produced: 2016 – present

Specifications
- Mass: 570 kg
- Length: 4.7 m
- Caliber: 306 mm (12.0 in)
- Maximum firing range: 150 km
- Engine: Solid Fuel
- Guidance system: GNSS + INS

EXTRA ("Extended Range Artillery") is an artillery rocket system developed and manufactured by Israel Military Industries (IMI) and used by the Israel Defense Forces, Azerbaijan, Vietnam and the Kazakh Army since 2013. It has a maximum range of 150km with a 120kg unitary warhead and accuracy of 10m CEP.

The EXTRA missiles can be launched by IMI's Lynx, as well as from a variety of other available launchers.

The ship-launched version is called TRIGON.

IMI also developed an air-launched version of the missile, originally called MARS. It was later renamed Rampage; and was scheduled to enter series production in 2019.

== Operators ==
Israel: Used by Israel Defense Forces.

Greece: On order for the Hellenic Army. Reportedly 320 missiles.

Azerbaijan

== See also ==
- LAR-160 – (Israel)
- ACCULAR – (Israel)
- Predator Hawk – (Israel)

compatible or similar foreign systems

- Thunderbolt-2000 – (Taiwan)
- M142 HIMARS – (United States)
- BM-30 Smerch – (Soviet Union)
- KN-09 – (North Korea)
- Fajr-5 – (Iran)
- TRG-300 Tiger - (Türkiye)
