= Azb REK =

Azb
- Type: Glide bomb
- Place of origin: Pakistan

Service history
- In service: 2019 - present
- Used by: Pakistan; Nigeria
- Wars: Insurgency in Balochistan; Operation Marg Bar Sarmachar

Production history
- Designer: Air Weapons Complex
- Manufacturer: Global Industrial Defence Solutions; Qaswa Industries

Specifications
- Maximum firing range: 30km-280km
- Warhead: Mk. 81; Mk. 82; Mk. 83; Mk. 84
- Flight ceiling: 9,000 m (30,000 ft)
- Maximum speed: Mach 0.6-0.9
- Guidance system: INS; GNSS
- Accuracy: <10m CEP (GPS) <=3m CEP (seeker)
- Launch platform: Fighter aircraft UCAVs

The Azb (Urdu: عضب, Sharp) is a family of Pakistani munition guidance kits designed by Air Weapons Complex while marketed for export by Global Industrial Defence Solutions and Qaswa Industries. Also known as the "Range Extension Kit" (REK), it converts conventional General purpose bombs (GPB) into precision-guided glide bombs. Though similar to the American JDAM-ER, it isn't bound to the International Traffic in Arms Regulations (ITAR).

== Overview ==
The Azb is an all weather fire-and-forget weapon that utilizes a tightly coupled INS/GNSS for navigation with later versions like the Azb-81LR also featuring an infra-red seeker for terminal guidance. The kit consists of a guidance unit which has the navigation systems, folding wings which deploy after being dropped from the pylons and an aerodynamic body on a cruciform tail. This allows the launching aircraft to engage targets from greater Standoff ranges, minimizing risk to the aircraft and reducing sortie times. Overall, the AZB is suited for fixed targets, such as installations, bunkers, aircraft hangars, and other high-value targets (HVT).

== Variants ==
=== Azb-81 ===
First member of the Azb series.

- Contractor: GIDS, Qaswa Industries
- Guidance: INS, GNSS, Infrared homing
- Weight: 80 to 100 kg (180 to 220 lb)
- Aircraft Compatibility: UCAVs
- Range: 30 to 40 km (19 to 25 mi)
- Warhead: Mk. 81/PK-81

=== Azb-81LR ===
The Azb-81 Long Range (LR) Small Diameter Bomb, also known as the Boosted-Range Extension Kit (B-REK) is an enhanced version of the Azb-81 revealed in 2024 during the IDEAS-2024 at Karachi. It features a specially designed airframe casing which uses a combination of a gliding systems and a miniature turbojet engine enabling it to reach ranges of up to 200 km.

- Contractor: Qaswa Industries
- Guidance: INS, GNSS, Infrared homing
- Weight: 100 to 125 kg (220 to 276 lb)
- Aircraft Compatibility: UCAVs, Combat aircraft, Infrared homing
- Range:
  - Low altitude: 120 km (75 mi)
  - High altitude: >=200 km (120 mi)
- Warhead: Mk. 81/PK-81

=== Azb-82 ===
Range Extension Kit for Mark 82 bombs.

- Contractor: GIDS, Qaswa Industries
- Guidance: INS, GNSS, Infrared homing
- Weight: 510 pounds (230 kg)
- Aircraft Compatibility: UCAVs, Combat aircraft
- Range: 100 km (62 mi)
- Warhead: Mk. 82/PK-82

=== Azb-83 ===
- Contractor: Qaswa Industries
- Guidance: INS, GNSS, Infrared homing
- Weight: 600 to 625 kg (1,323 to 1,378 lb)
- Aircraft Compatibility: Combat aircraft
- Range: 100 km (62 mi)
- Warhead: Mk. 83/PK-83

=== Azb-83LR ===
Enhanced version of the Azb-83 which features upgraded sub-systems and navigation systems. Fitted with turbo-jet engine.

- Contractor: Qaswa Industries
- Guidance: INS, GNSS, Infrared homing
- Weight: 800 to 825 kg (1,764 to 1,819 lb)
- Aircraft Compatibility: Combat aircraft
- Range: 250 to 280 km (160 to 170 mi)
- Warhead: Mk. 83/PK-83

=== Azb-84 ===
- Contractor: Qaswa Industries
- Guidance: INS, GNSS, Infrared homing
- Weight: 2,535 to 2,590 pounds (1,150 to 1,175 kg)
- Aircraft Compatibility: Combat aircraft
- Range: 90 km (56 mi)
- Warhead: Mk. 84/PK-84

=== Azb-V & Azb-VI ===
Range Extension Kits for Mark-84 GPBs are under development by GIDS. Revealed during IDEF-2023.

== Launch platforms ==
- JF-17 Thunder
- Mirage-III ROSE
- Mirage-V ROSE
- Bayraktar Akıncı
- Bayraktar TB2
- GIDS Shahpar-III

== Combat history ==
Amidst the 2024 Iran–Pakistan conflict, the Pakistan Air Force launched airstrikes on BLA targets within Iran in a military operation codenamed Operation Marg Bar Sarmachar during which PAF utilized Azb REKs to destroy 7 terrorist hideouts.

== Operators ==
- Pakistan
  - Pakistan Air Force
- Nigeria
  - Nigerian Air Force

== See also ==
- Takbir
- H-2 SOW
- H-4 SOW
- LS PGB
