= UMPB D-30SN =

Russian glide bomb

UMPB D-30SN УМПБ Д-30СН
- Type: Glide bomb Surface-to-air missile
- Place of origin: Russia

Service history
- In service: 2024-present
- Used by: Russian Armed Forces
- Wars: Russo-Ukrainian war

Specifications
- Maximum firing range: 90 to 120km
- Blast yield: 100kg
- Propellant: Jet engine
- Guidance system: satellite, inertial navigation
- Launch platform: Su-34, S-70 Okhotnik

The UMPB D-30SN (in Russian: УМПБ Д-30СН) is a Russian precision guided glide bomb, also known as the "Universal Interspecific Glide Munition". It consists of a folding wing and aerodynamic surfaces on a cruciform tail, enabling it to glide towards its target from greater standoff ranges compared to conventional "dumb" bombs such as the FAB-250. This allows the launching aircraft to engage targets from greater distances, minimizing risk to the aircraft, and reduces sortie times. It uses both GLONASS satellite navigation and internal navigation systems, improving accuracy over extended distances. It is comparable to the US made GBU-39/B.

== Design ==
The weapon consists of a cruciform tail, streamlined body and folding wings, which are stowed before launch, lying flush with the body. The weapon is attached inverted to the aircraft, rotating itself after launch. The weapon's overall appearance is more streamlined compared to the UMPK bomb kit also in service with the Russian Air Force. It uses a GLONASS system and an inertial navigation unit for guidance, with a Kometa-M satellite receiver providing improved jam resistance. The Kometa receiver significantly improves ECCM capability, reducing suppression radius by 100-300 times. It can be launched from various platforms, such as Tornado-S multiple launch rocket systems, as well as from aircraft. According to Oleksii Hetman, the accuracy of the system is claimed to be 7–8 meters, however "in practice, it turns out to be around 15".

The weapon can also be equipped with a jet engine to enhance its range.

== History ==
The weapon was first seen in public in March 2024. From March 27 to May 7, an estimated 671 bombs were produced.

Now established in Russian service, the bomb exerts additional pressure on already strained Ukrainian air defence systems, with strikes occurring outside of the range of most Ukrainian anti-air systems.

=== Operational use ===
The weapons were first used on March 26, 2024, to attack the Ukrainian city of Kharkiv. The strike resulted in one fatality and 19 injuries.

On 25 May, two UMPB D-30SN bombs were dropped on Kharkiv. One bomb struck a supermarket, where 200 people were present, resulting in 12 deaths and 43 injuries.

On 30 August, five UMPB D-30SN bombs were dropped on Kharkiv. Five people were killed, and 59 others were injured. Ten residential buildings and an educational institution were damaged. The attack was condemned by the United States ambassador to Ukraine, Bridget Brink.

On 5 October 2024, an out of control Sukhoi S-70 Okhotnik-B drone was deliberately shot down by a Russian Sukhoi Su-57 and crashed on the Ukrainian side of the front line. The wreckage included a D-30SN nose cone, indicating that the S-70 was performing operational bombing trials in the region.

== See also ==
- UMPK (bomb kit)
- GBU-39 Small Diameter Bomb
