= FAB-500 =

500 Kg unguided aerial bomb

FAB-500 series
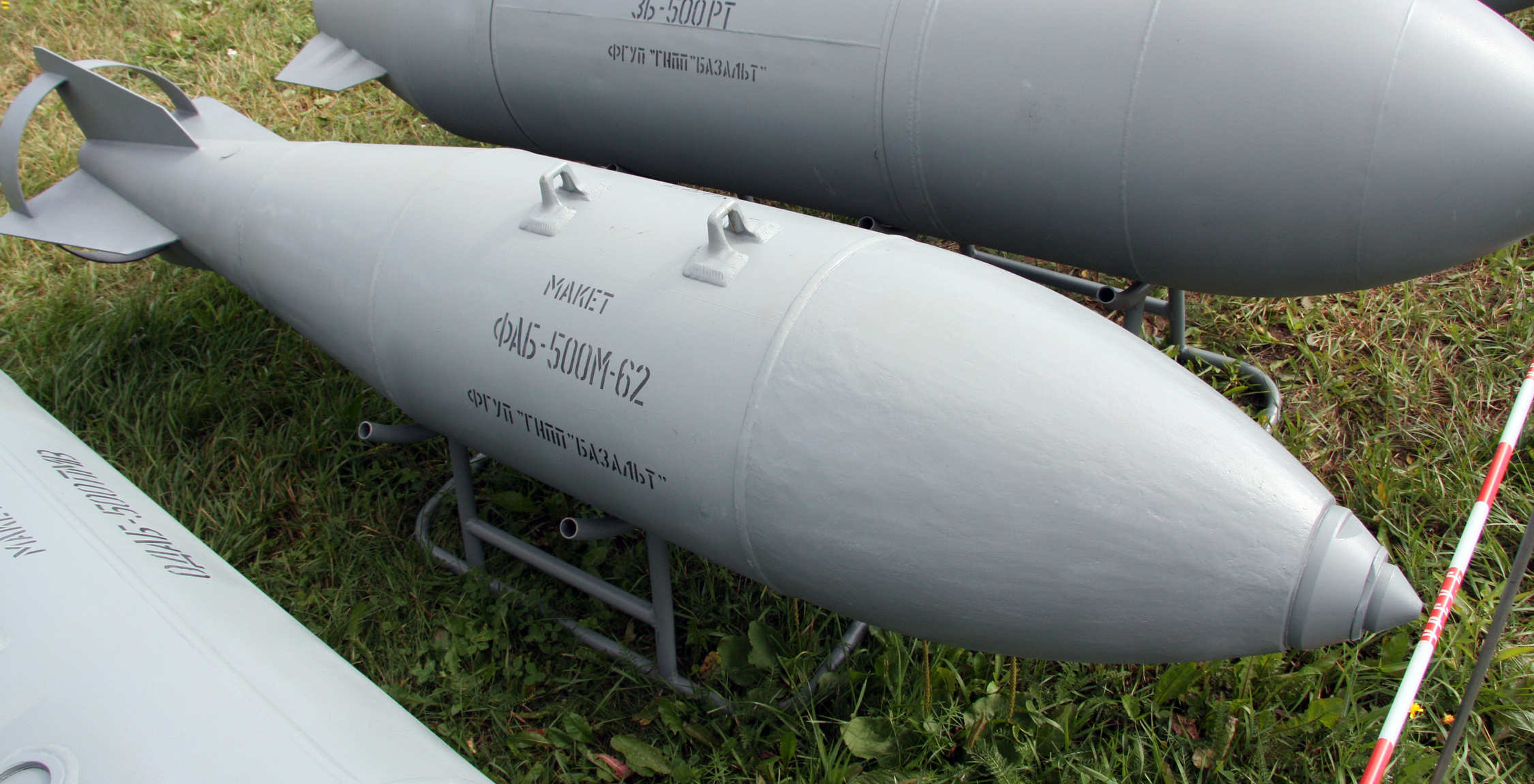
- FAB-500M-62 (marked in cyrillic: ФАБ-500М-62)
- Type: Unguided high-capacity/general-purpose aerial bomb
- Place of origin: Soviet Union

Production history
- Produced: 1931: FAB-500sv; 1943: FAB-500M-43; 1944: FAB-500M-44; 1946: FAB-500M-46; 1954: FAB-500M-54; 1962: FAB-500M-62
- Variants: KAB-500 (guided bomb)

Specifications
- Mass: 500 kilograms (1,100 lb)
- Length: 2,470 millimetres (97.2 in)
- Diameter: 400 millimetres (15.7 in)
- Filling: High explosive
- Filling weight: 201 kilograms (440 lb)

The FAB-500 (cyrillic: ФАБ-500, acronym for Russian: фугасная авиационная бомба, ”high-capacity aerial bomb”) is a Soviet/Russian designation for general purpose high-explosive aerial bombs of the 500-kilogram (1,100 lb) class. Starting in 1931 with the FAB-500sv, later models are today primarily used by the Russian Aerospace Forces, former Soviet republics and customer countries.

The latest bombs in the series use the UMPK, a winged system developed after 2022 Ukraine war, for precision satellite guidance and increased stand-off distance.

== Development ==
=== FAB-500sv ===
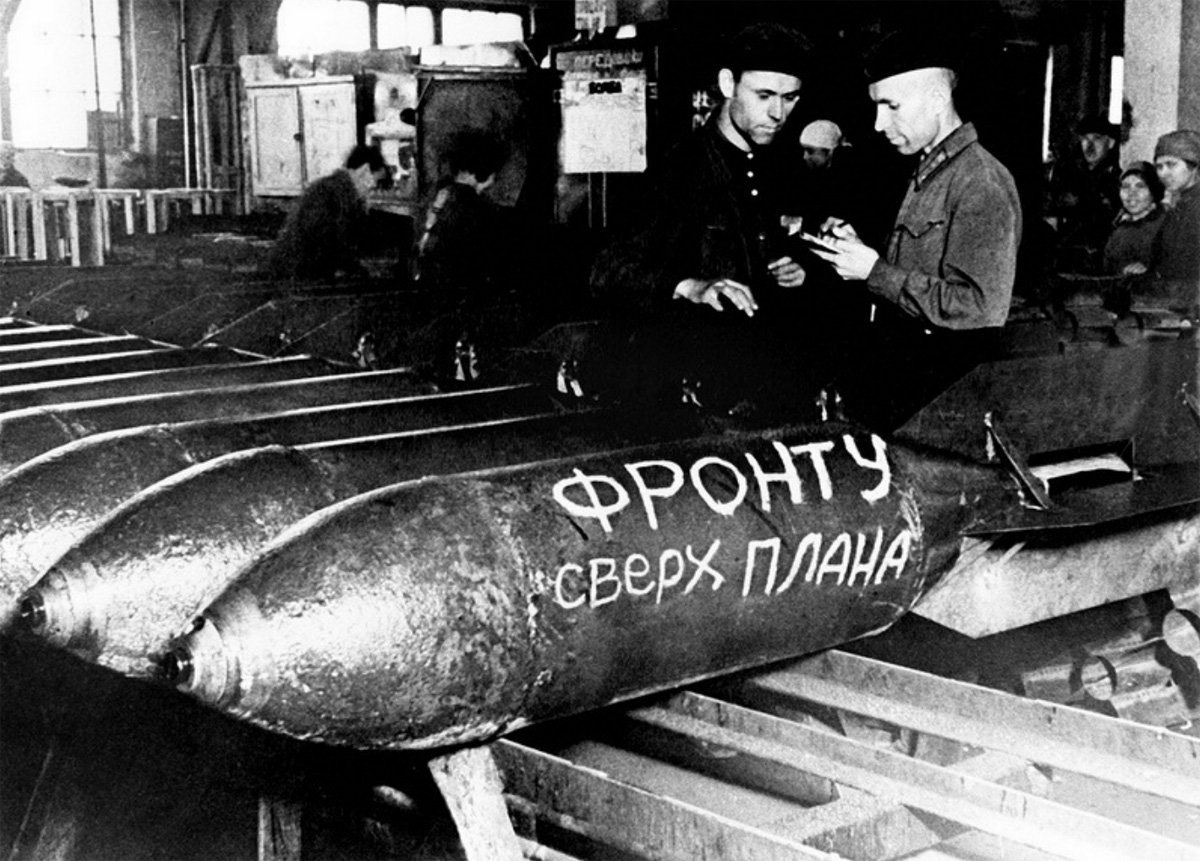
FAB-500sv bombs being produced during WWII

The first model of the series began construction, together with the downscaled 250 kg FAB-250sv, in 1929. Their characteristics were similar, except that, in this bomb, the conical tail cone was welded to the cylinder of the body. Test were carried out throughout 1931, yielding satisfactory results, resulting in series production beginning immediately that year.

In early 1932, necessary changes were made for its operation and continued production. The attachment point was modified, as with the FAB 250, with a second lift eyelet behind the lift eyelet, attached to the bomb by rivets. The joint between the cylindrical body and conical tail was strengthened by increasing the length of the inner lip of the conical tail cone which passes under the cylindrical edge for improved safety. In 1933, the second lift eyelets connection was updated from a riveted one to a retaining collar clamped around the body. In 1934, the lift eyelet also had its connection strengthened by the addition of a retaining collar clamped around the body, with the stabilizing fins being connected to the tail cone by discontinuous segments of welding. In 1935 the construction was updated by reducing the weight of approximately three kilograms.

=== World War II development ===
Aerial bomb development during World War II was limited. In 1943, the long welded FAB-500M-43 rolled out, and in 1944 the short stubby FAB-500M-44, which was followed by the similar FAB-500M-46 just after the war, featuring a nose ring for increased drag.

=== Cold War development ===
The FAB-500M-54 model was rolled out in 1954, shaped for internal carriage by heavy bombers.

The FAB-500M-62 rolled out in 1962, a low-drag bomb intended for carriage on external hardpoints on fighter bombers etc. Early models were unguided, with a single nose fuze, and compatible with most models of Soviet aircraft.

== Operational history ==
The FAB-500sv was used throughout World War 2 and supplied to various countries and beligerants. Prior to WWII it was supplied to the Spanish Republic during the Spanish Civil War, there being designated R-500, the R standing for its Russian origin, followed by the weight of the bomb.

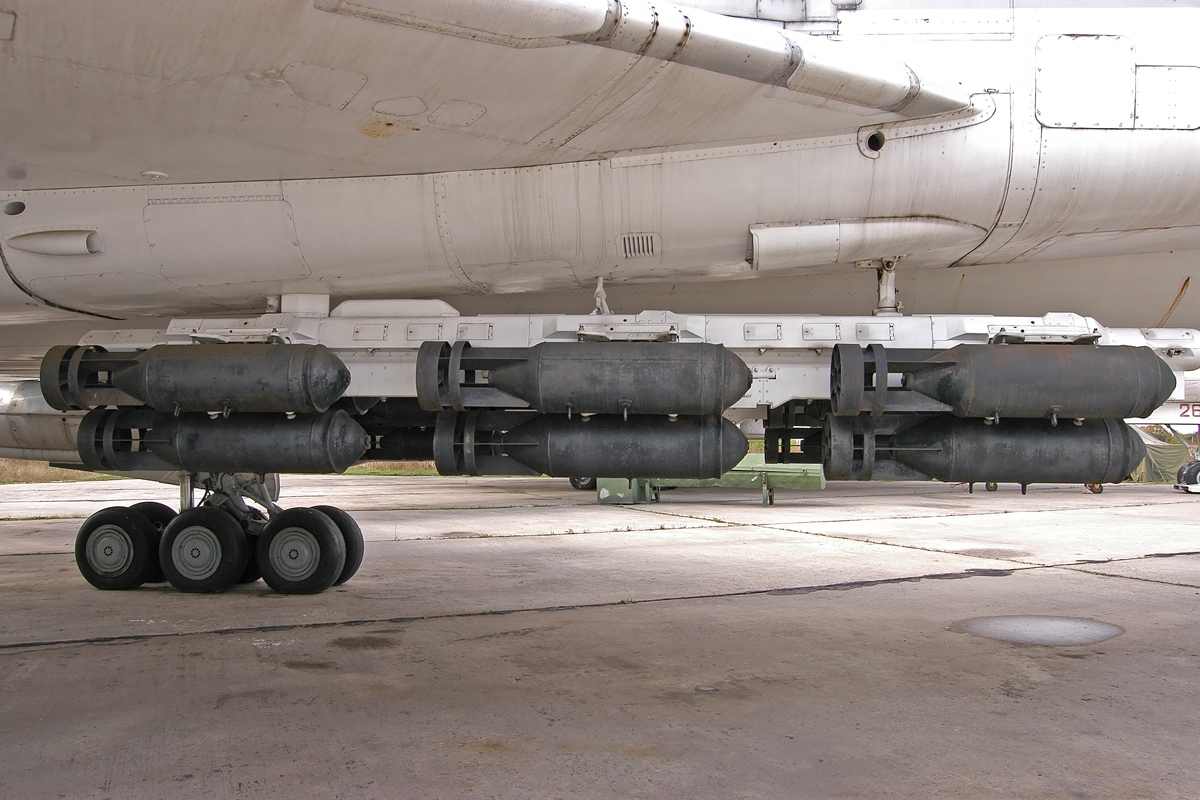
Up to eighteen M-54 bombs on two underwing pylons and internal bay of a Tu-22M

The FAB-500 was widely employed over Afghanistan by Soviet and allied Afghan forces in the 1980s and saw use during the 2011-2019 Syrian civil war, where it was carried by both Russian and Syrian warplanes.

The M-62 variant has been used by Russian military forces in the 2022 Russian invasion of Ukraine. On 13 March 2022 and 14 May 2022, FAB-500 bombs were found in Ukrainian cities of Chernihiv and Odesa.

In March 2023, Russian Su-35s launched a number of FAB-500 M-62, wreckage of which indicated that they had been fitted with an UMPK, a glide kit involving pop-out wings. It is unknown whether these had an internal navigation system, or were fitted with wings simply to extend the range to up to 70 km. It also is believed that these give Russian aircraft a stand-off ability to hit Ukrainian targets without risking exposure to Ukrainian air defences.

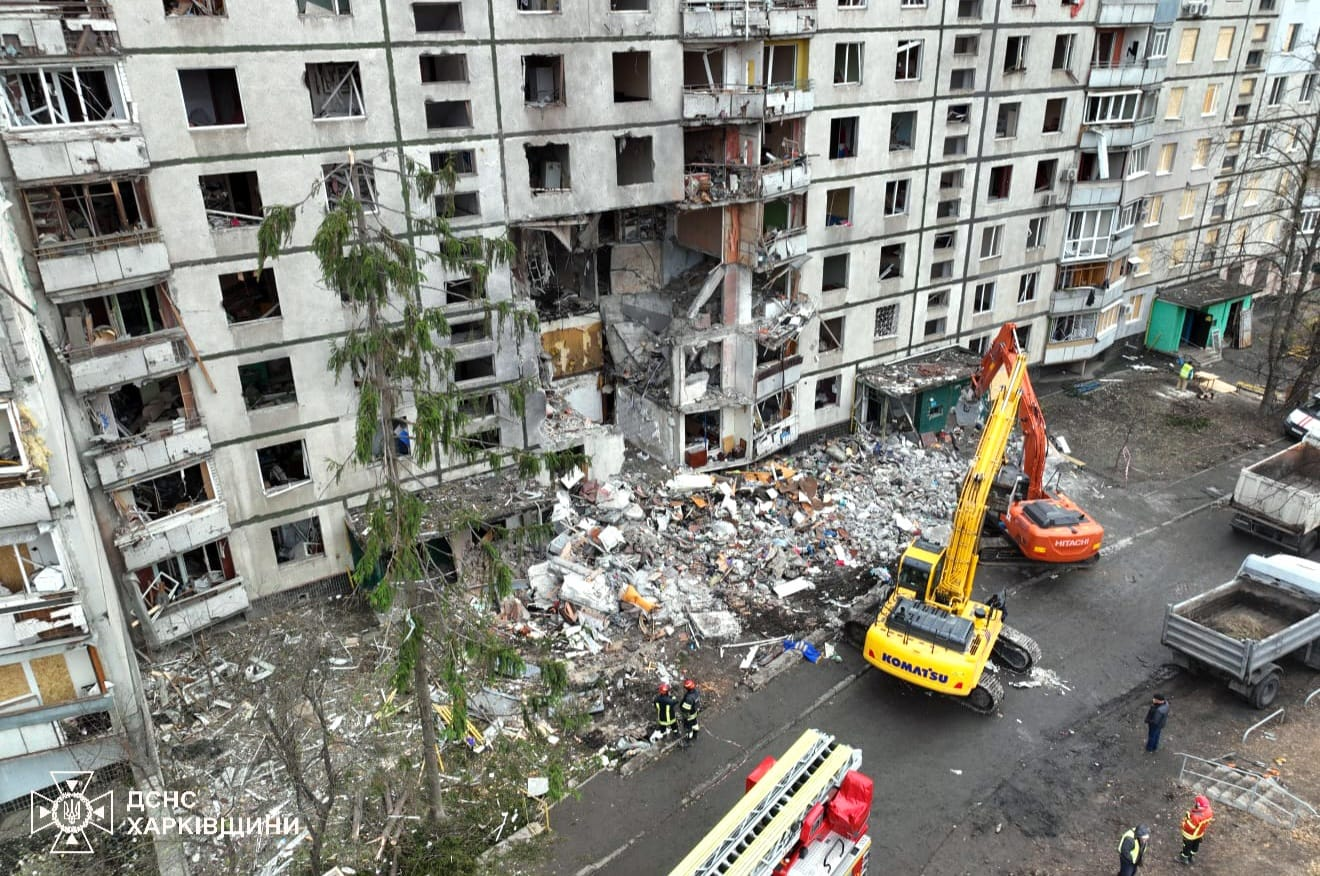
A nine-story apartment building in Kharkiv, Ukraine, after being hit by a Russian FAB-500 bomb during the Russian invasion of Ukraine in October 2024

As of May 2023, UMPK-equipped FAB-500 glide bombs have continued to be used by Russia in Ukraine, with up to 20 of them being dropped every day, and Ukrainian air defences lack the capability to intercept them. The full-scale training of Russian pilots on using the bombs reportedly started in November 2023.

According to a Russian milblogger cited by the Institute for the Study of War, the FAB-500 "hold[s] an explosive weight of 150 kilograms, [has] a damage radius of 250 meters, and can destroy headquarters, warehouses, and concrete and reinforced concrete objects."

== Operational envelope (FAB-500 M-62) ==
- Release altitude: 570–12,000 metres (1,870–39,400 ft)
- Release speed: 500–1,900 kilometres per hour (311–1,180 mph)

== Models ==
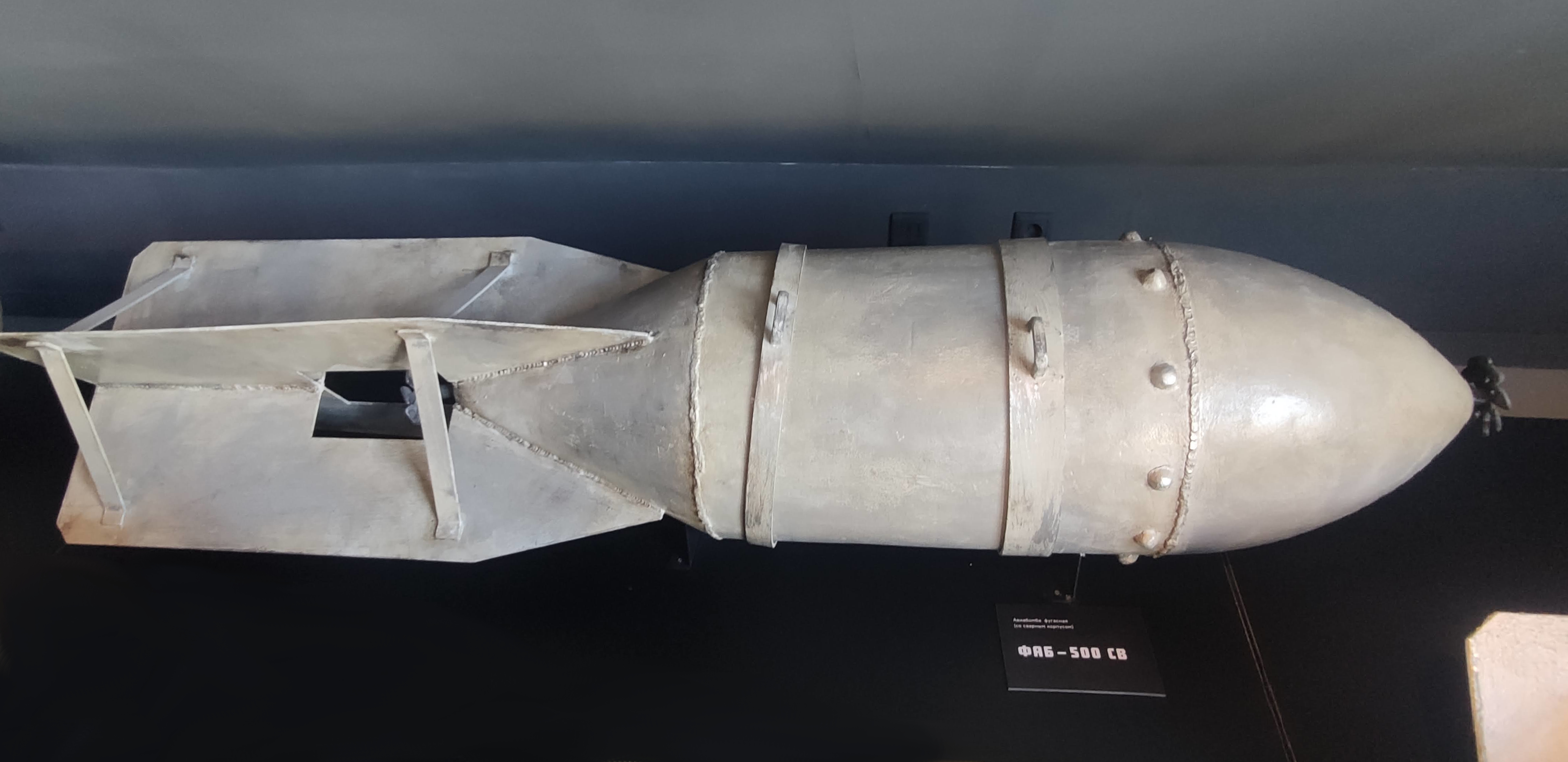
FAB-500sv (model 1935)

- FAB-500sv (ФАБ-500св) – Constructed from 1929–1931 together with the downscaled FAB-250sv. Bulted construction. Charge: 235 kilograms (518 lb) TNT; fuze: tip + base. Length: 2,426–2,440 millimetres (95.5–96.1 in); center of mass from the tip: 751–761 millimetres (29.6–30.0 in); caliber: 449.5–452.5 millimetres (17.70–17.81 in).
  - FAB-500sv (model 1931) – weight: 507.0 kilograms (1,117.7 lb)
  - FAB-500sv (model 1932) – weight: 507.3 kilograms (1,118 lb); addition of a riveted second lift eyelet behind the main lift eyelet
  - FAB-500sv (model 1933) – weight: 509.8 kilograms (1,124 lb); second lift eyelet changed from riveted to a retaining collar around the body
  - FAB-500sv (model 1934) – weight: 511.3 kilograms (1,127 lb); lift eyelet strengthened with a retaining collar around the body
  - FAB-500sv (model 1935) – weight: 508.3 kilograms (1,121 lb); weight lowered by 3 kilograms (6.6 lb); welded tail
- FAB-500M-43 (ФАБ-500М-43, model 1943) – long welded construction
- FAB-500M-44 (ФАБ-500М-44, model 1944) – short welded construction
- FAB-500M-46 (ФАБ-500М-46, model 1946) – short welded construction with a nose ring for extra air resistance

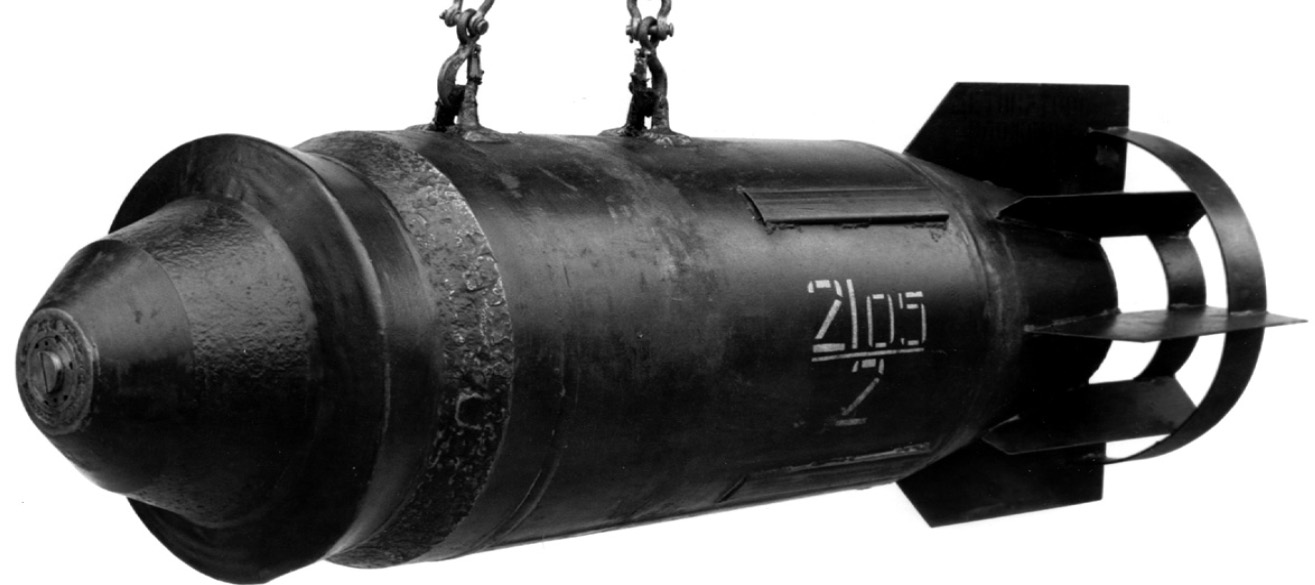
FAB-500M-54 (high-drag bomb)

- FAB-500M-54 (ФАБ-500М-54, model 1954) – original 1954 high-drag model intended for internal carriage in heavy bombers, featuring a ballistic ring on the nose of the bomb to act as a vortex generator to aid the bomb's stabilizers.

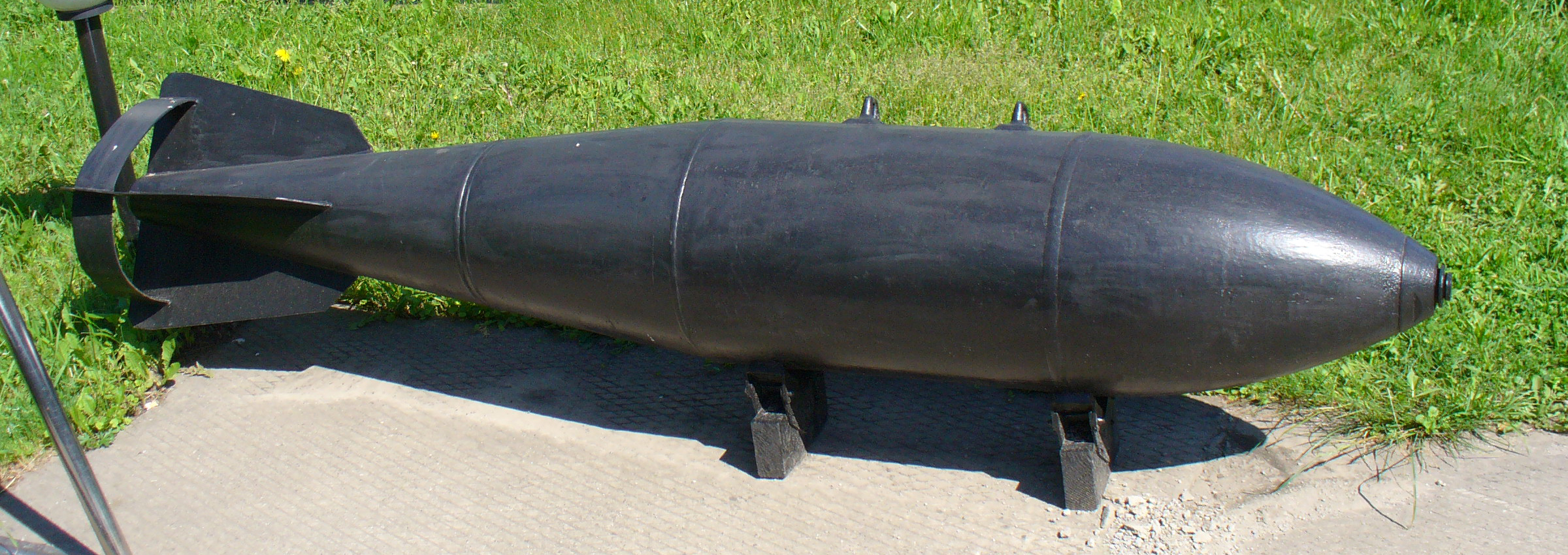
FAB-500M-62 (low-drag bomb)

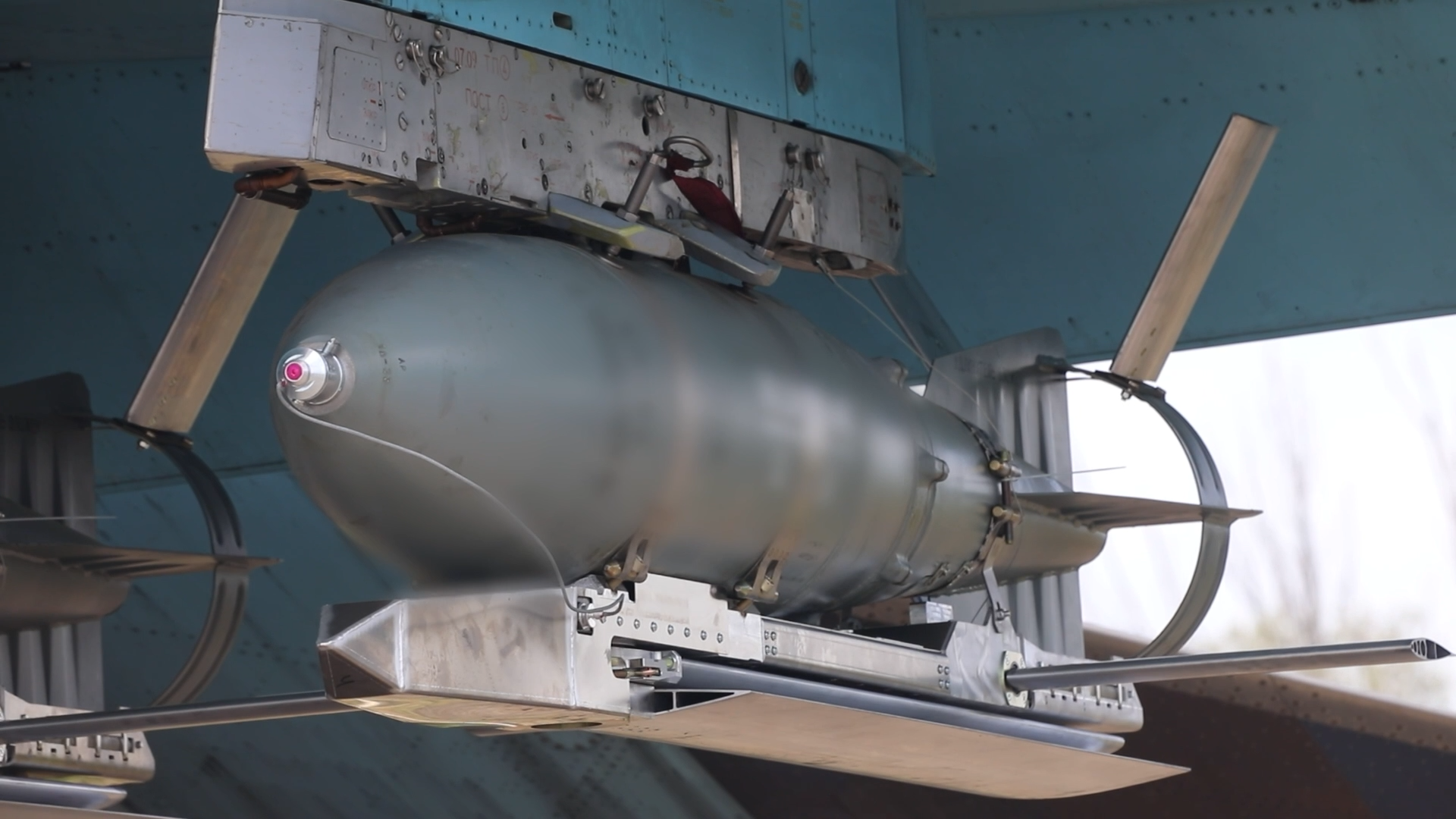
FAB-500T with UMPK (bomb kit)

- FAB-500M-62 (ФАБ-500М-62, model 1962) – low-drag 1962 model designed for external carriage on hardpoints on fighter-bombers.
  - FAB-500M-62T (ФАБ-500М-62Т, model 1962) – heat-resistant, capable of withstanding high-temperature aerodynamic heating, arising during flight at high speeds. Developed for the MiG-25RB.
  - FAB-500M-62 MPK ((ФАБ-500 М-62 с МПК)
- FAB-500T (ФАБ-500Т)
- FAB-500TA (ФАБ-500ТА)
- FAB-500ShN (ФАБ-500ШН) – parachute-retarded thin cased bomb
- FAB-500ShL (ФАБ-500ШЛ) – parachute-retarded high explosive bomb
- FAB-500-300 (ФАБ-500-300) – thick cased high explosive
- FAB-500TS (ФАБ-500ТС) – thick cased high explosive and fragmentation
- FAB-500TSM (ФАБ-500ТСМ)
- OFAB-500 (ОФАБ-500) – general purpose high explosive fragmentation bomb (contains 3 x 150 kg submunitions)
- OFAB-500U (ОФАБ-500У) – delayed action fragmentation bomb
- OFAB-500ShR (ОФАБ-500ШP) – parachute-retarded fragmentation bomb

== Operators ==
- India
- Indonesia
- Malaysia
- Mali
- China
- Republic of China
- Russia
- Soviet Union
- Spanish Republic (FAB-500sv)
- Vietnam
- Venezuela

== See also ==
- Soviet and Russian aerial bombs
- FAB-250
- FAB-1500
- Mark 83 bomb – American counterpart
