= Glide bomb =

Aerial weapon with flight control surfaces

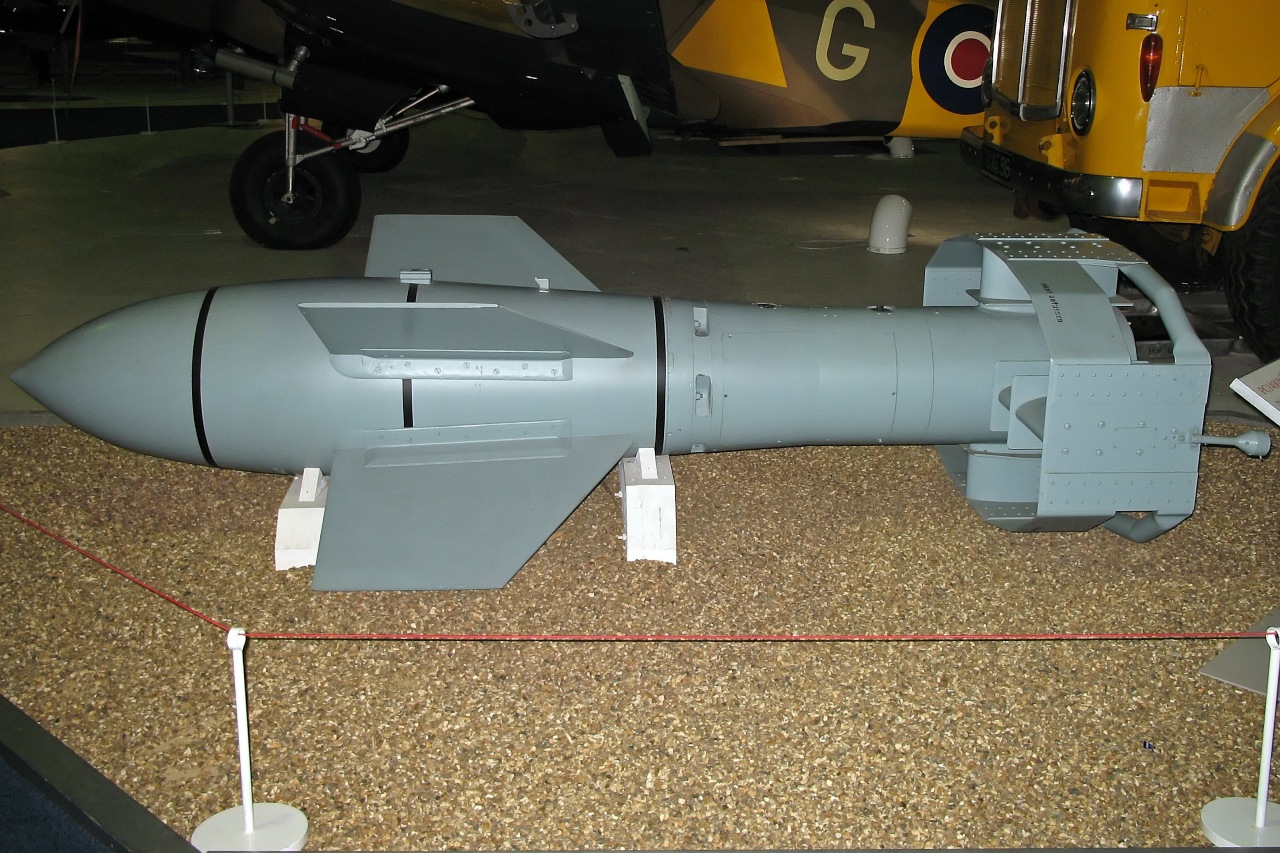
A German "Fritz X" glide bomb

A glide bomb or stand-off bomb is a standoff weapon with flight control surfaces to give it a flatter, gliding flight path than that of a conventional bomb without such surfaces. This allows it to be released at a distance from the target rather than right over it, allowing a successful attack without exposing the launching aircraft to anti-aircraft defenses near the target. Glide bombs can accurately deliver warheads in a manner comparable to cruise missiles at a fraction of the cost, sometimes by installing flight control kits on simple unguided bombs, and they are very difficult for surface-to-air missiles to intercept due to their tiny radar cross sections and short flight times. The only effective countermeasure in most cases is to shoot down enemy aircraft before they approach within launching range, making glide bombs very potent weapons where wartime exigencies prevent this.

World War II-era glide bombs like the German Fritz X and Henschel Hs 293 pioneered the use of remote control systems, allowing the controlling aircraft to direct the bomb to a pinpoint target as a pioneering form of precision-guided munition. Modern systems are generally self-guided or semi-automated, using GPS or laser designators to hit their target.

The term "glide bombing" does not refer to the use of glide bombs, but a style of shallow-angle dive bombing.

== Early efforts ==
=== German designs ===
==== World War I ====
In October 1914, Georg Wilhelm von Siemens suggested what became known as the Siemens torpedo glider, a wire-guided flying missile that would essentially have comprised a naval torpedo with an attached airframe. It was not intended to be flown into a target, but rather at a suitable altitude and position, a signal would be transmitted, causing the airframe components to detach from the torpedo, which would then enter the water and continue towards its target. Guidance signals were to be transmitted through a thin copper wire, and guide flares were to be carried to help control.

Siemens-Schuckertwerke was already occupied with remote-controlled boats (the FL-boats or Fernlenkboote), and had some experience in this area. Flight testing was performed under the supervision of an engineer with the surname Dorner from January 1915 onwards, using airships as carriers and different types of biplane and monoplane glider airframes to which a torpedo was fitted. The last test flight was performed on February 8, 1918.

It was planned to use the Siemens-Schuckert R.VIII bomber as a carrier craft, but the Treaty of Versailles stopped the project.

==== World War II ====
===== Development =====
During World War II, the first operational glide bombs were developed by the Germans as anti-ship weapons. Ships are typically very difficult to attack: A direct hit or an extremely near miss is needed to do any serious damage, and hitting a target as small as a ship was difficult in this period. At first, dive bombers were used with some success in this role, but their successes were countered by ever-increasing anti-aircraft defenses on the Royal Navy ships they were attacking. By 1941, accurate bombing was as difficult as ever, with the added problem of evading anti-aircraft fire.

The German solution was the development of a number of glide bombs employing radio control guidance. One was created by fitting a control package on the rear of an otherwise standard bomb, starting with their 1400 kg armor-piercing bomb to create the Ruhrstahl SD 1400, commonly called Fritz X. This weapon was designed specifically to pierce the deck armor of heavy cruisers and battleships. The bomb aimer dropped the bomb from high altitude while the aircraft was still approaching the ship, and guided it to impact with the target by sending commands to spoilers attached to its rear. This proved to be difficult to do, because as the bomb dropped toward the target it fell further behind the launch aircraft, eventually becoming difficult to see. This problem was solved by having the launch aircraft slow down and enter a climb to avoid overtaking the bomb as it fell.

In addition, it proved difficult to properly guide the bomb to impact as the angle of descent changed, and if the bomb was not aimed accurately so as to end up roughly right over the target, there was little that could be done at later stages to fix the problem. Nevertheless, the Fritz X proved useful with crews trained on its use. In test drops from 8,000 m (26,000 ft), experienced bomb aimers could place half the bombs within a 15 m (49 ft 3 in) radius and 90% within 30 m (98 ft 5 in).

Design work started as early as 1939, and a version of the guidance package mounted to standard 500 kg bombs was tested in September 1940. It was found that the bomb was unable to penetrate a ship's armor, so changes were made to fit an armor-piercing warhead before the system finally entered service in 1943. The basic A-1 model was the only one to be produced in any number, but developments included the B model with a custom armor-piercing warhead, and the C model with a conical warhead designed to hit the water short of the ship and then travel a short distance underwater to hit the ship below the waterline. The guidance system for the Hs 293 series was the same as the Fritz X unpowered munition; it used a Funkgerät FuG 203 Kehl radio control transmitter with a single two-axis joystick in the deploying bomber, and an FuG 230 Straßburg receiver in the munition.

===== Operational use =====
Following the capitulation of Italy in 1943, Germany damaged the Italian battleship Italia and sank the Roma with Fritz X bombs. Attacks were also made on the USS Savannah, causing much damage and loss of life. HMS Warspite was hit by three Fritz X, and although casualties were few, the ship had to be towed to Malta for repairs and was out of action for six months. The cruiser USS Philadelphia was very slightly damaged by several near misses from Fritz X bombs. The light cruiser HMS Uganda was also hit and put out of action for thirteen months as a result.

A more widely employed weapon was the Henschel Hs 293, which included wings and a rocket motor to allow the bomb to glide some distance away from the launch aircraft. This weapon was designed for use against thinly armored, but highly defended targets, such as convoy merchantmen or their escorting warships. When launched, a small liquid-fueled rocket fired to speed the weapon up and get it out in front of the releasing aircraft, which was flown to approach the target just off to one side. The bomb then dropped close to the water and glided in parallel to the launch aircraft, with the bomb aimer adjusting the flight left or right. As long as the bomb was dropped at roughly the right range so it did not run out of altitude while gliding in, the system was easy to use, at least against slow-moving targets.

The Hs 293 was first used operationally in the Bay of Biscay against RN and RCN destroyers, sloops and frigates. Its combat debut was made on August 25, 1943, when the sloop HMS Bideford was slightly damaged by a missile that failed to fully detonate, but killed one crewman. Another sloop, HMS Landguard, survived a near miss with slight damage. The Germans attacked again two days later, sinking HMS Egret on August 27, 1943; they also seriously damaged HMCS Athabaskan. Over one-thousand Allied soldiers died on 25 November 1943 when a Hs 293 sank the troopship HMT Rohna from Mediterranean convoy KMF 26.

===== Allied countermeasures =====
Several defensive measures were implemented right away. Ships capable of maneuvering at high speed were instructed to make tight turns across the weapon's flight path in order to complicate the missile operator's efforts. Attacking aircraft were interdicted with air patrols and heavy-caliber anti-aircraft weapons, disrupting either the visual or radio links to the guided weapons. Smoke was used to hide ships at anchor. Allied aircraft also attacked the home bases of the special German units equipped with these weapons, primarily (Gruppen II and III of Kampfgeschwader 100 and Gruppe II of Kampfgeschwader 40).

American, British and Canadian scientists also developed sophisticated radio jammers to disrupt the guidance signal. Ultimately nine different jamming systems were deployed in the European theater against these weapons. While early models proved inadequate, by the time the Allies were preparing for the invasion of France in 1944 more capable systems were deployed, and the success rate of guided weapons declined considerably. Even more important to the defeat of the weapons was Allied command of the airspace and the interception of incoming bombers by Allied fighter aircraft.

The Hs 293 was also used in August 1944 to attack bridges over the Sée and Sélune at the southern end of the Cherbourg peninsula in an attempt to break U.S. general George S. Patton's advance, but this mission was unsuccessful. A similar mission against bridges on the river Oder, designed to slow the Soviet advance into Germany, was made in April 1945, but failed.

The Germans also experimented with television guidance systems on the Hs 293D models. Their use was problematic: As the bomb approaches the target, even tiny amounts of control input would cause the target to jump around the television display, so much of the difficulty was in developing control systems that would become progressively less sensitive as the pilot required. A wire-guided version, Hs 293B, was also developed, but this variant was never deployed.

=== British program ===
In 1939 Sir Dennistoun Burney and Nevil Shute Norway, worked together on an air-launched gliding torpedo, the "Toraplane", and a gliding bomb, "Doravane". Despite much work and many trials, the Toraplane could not be launched with repeatable accuracy and it was abandoned in 1942.

=== American designs ===
The United States Army Air Forces started a wide-ranging development program of both glide bombs, known as "GB", and similar systems designed to fall more vertically, as "VG". Several models of both concepts were used in limited numbers during World War II.

The first to be used operationally was the Aeronca GB-1, essentially an autopilot attached to a small glider airframe carrying a bomb. It was intended to allow the Eighth Air Force bombers to drop their payloads far from their targets and thus avoid having to overfly the most concentrated areas of anti-aircraft artillery fire. It was first used on 28 May 1944 against the Eifeltor marshalling yard in Cologne, but only 42 of 113 bombs released reached anywhere near the target; most "spun in and exploded 15 miles from the target ... many of the batteries failed to hold [their] charge").

More advanced models in the GB series included the television-guided GB-4, GB-5, GB-12, and GB-13, which used contrast-seekers for anti-ship use, and the command-guided GB-8, "Azon", "Razon", as well as the infrared-guided "Felix". United States Navy glide bombs included the ASM-N-2 "Bat" and its earlier variant, the "Pelican". The longer-range Bat used an active radar seeker and was used in the Pacific on August 13, 1944, but could not distinguish between targets in a cluttered environment and could be easily spoofed by even simple radar countermeasures. Only four examples of an experimental glide bomb, the "Pratt-Read LBE", were produced.

== Post-World War II developments ==
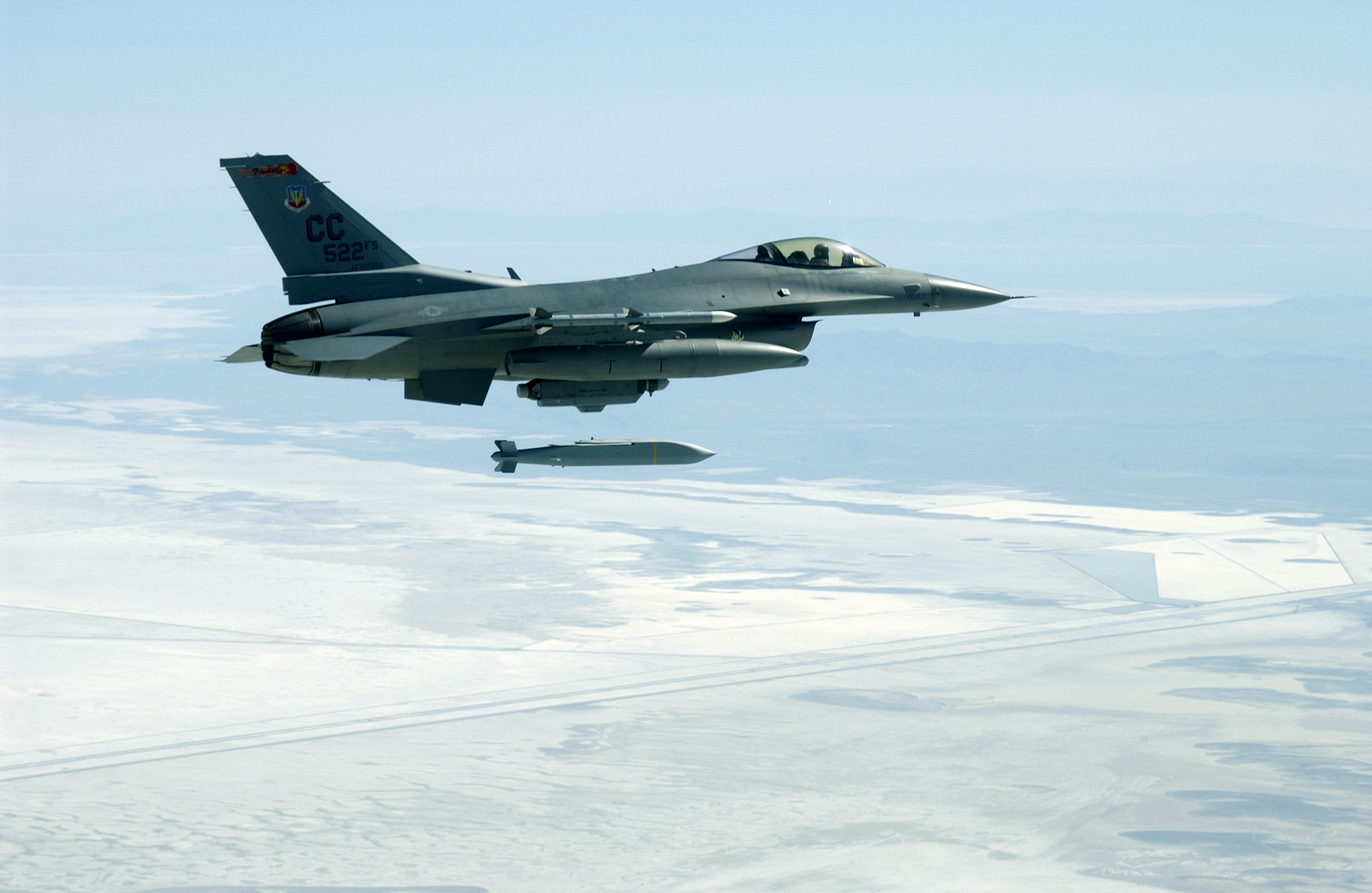
An F-16C releases an AGM-154 JSOW. The AGM-154 JSOW has a range of 12 nmi (22 km) for a low altitude launch, or 70 nmi (130 km) for a high altitude launch.

After the war, the increasing sophistication of electronics allowed these systems to be developed as practical devices; from the 1960s air forces deployed a number of such systems, including the USAF's AGM-62 Walleye. Contrast seekers were also steadily improved, becoming very effective in the widely used AGM-65 Maverick missile. Both were standard systems until the 1980s when the development of laser guidance and GPS-based systems made them unnecessary for all but the most accurate of roles. Various television-based systems remain in limited service for super-accurate uses, but have otherwise been removed.

In the anti-ship role, direct attack from an aircraft, even at long range, became more dangerous due to the deployment of anti-aircraft missiles on ships. Weapons such as the Bat had ranges too short to keep the attacking aircraft out of range, especially in a force provided with air cover. This was addressed with the introduction of small jet engines that greatly extended the range, producing the anti-ship missile class that remains widely used today.

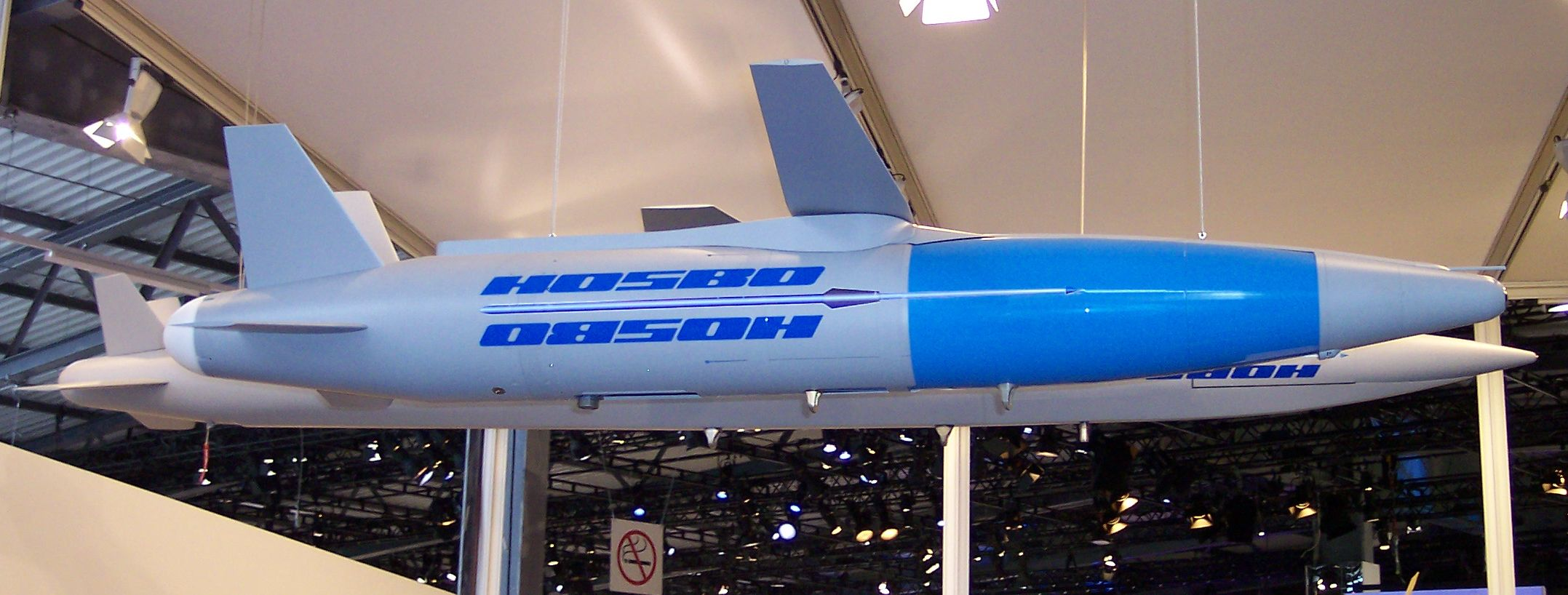
HOPE/HOSBO of the Luftwaffe

Similarly, the need to attack well-defended targets such as airbases and military command posts led to the development of newer generations of glide bombs. European air forces use a glide package with a cluster bomb warhead for remotely attacking airbases. Laser and GPS guidance systems are used.

=== Notable glide bombs ===
- AGM-154 Joint Standoff Weapon (JSOW) is an American glide bomb introduced in 1998.
- DRDO Glide Bombs are developed by India. It has a winged (Gaurav) and non-winged (Gautham) variant. These are developed by DRDO and manufactured by Adani Defence & Aerospace.
- GBU-44/B Viper Strike is an American glide bomb.

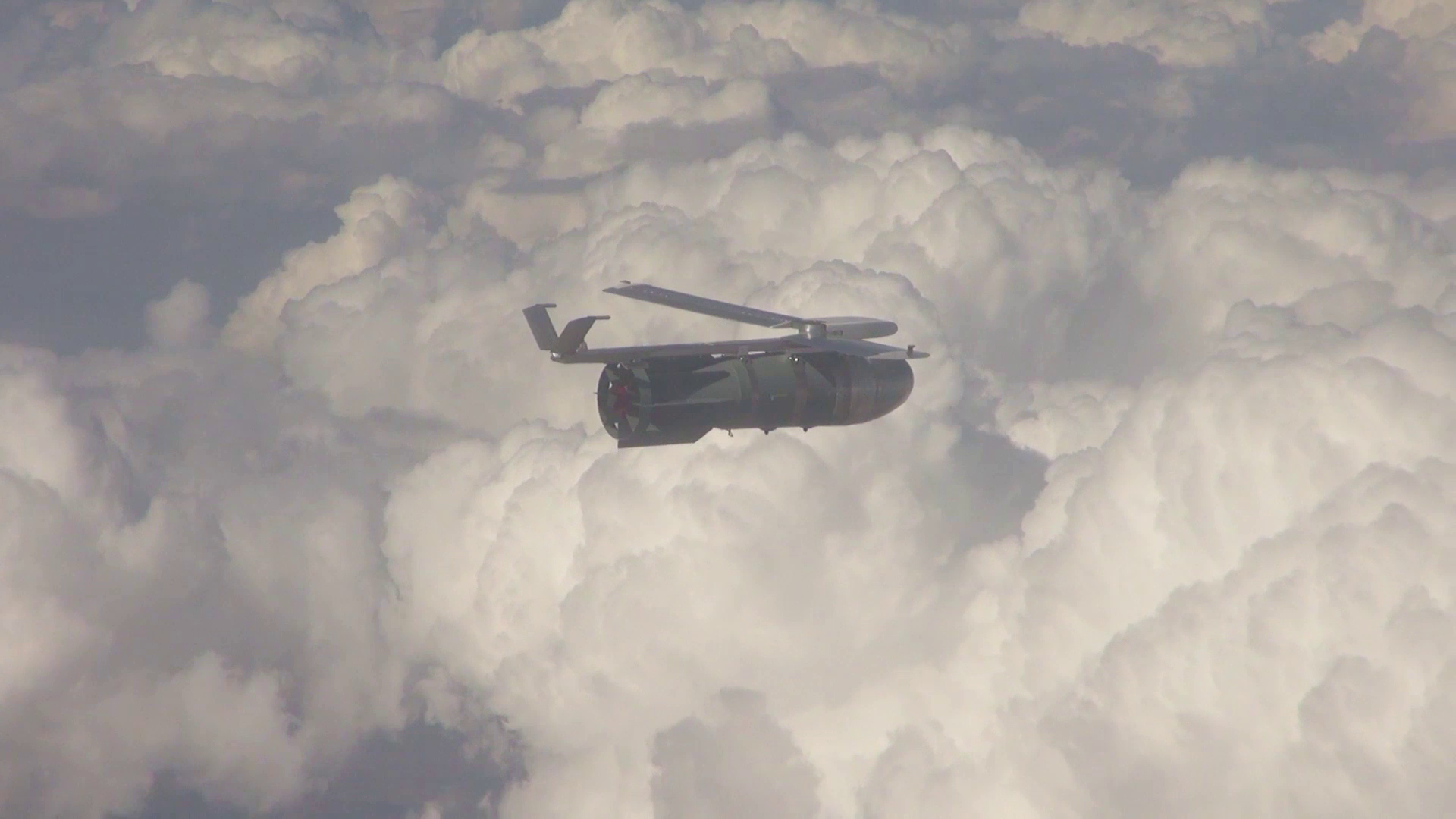
A Russian FAB-3000 with a UMPK guidance kit attached, converting the unguided bomb into a glide bomb.

- Glide bombs adapted from existing unguided bombs such as FAB-500 and FAB-1500 using inexpensive UMPK kits have been used extensively by Russian forces in the Russian invasion of Ukraine due to their low cost and reduced vulnerability to Ukrainian air defenses compared to more sophisticated cruise missiles, hypersonic missiles, and unmanned aerial vehicles with longer flight times and more easily detected propulsion systems. Russian forces have been using Sukhoi Su-34 and Su-35 jets to launch glide bombs from within Russian-held territory beyond the range of Ukrainian air defenses. These glide bombs can carry between 250kg and 3 tonnes of explosives for over 60km and have been cited as one of the primary reasons for the Ukrainian retreat from the town of Avdiivka in February 2024 by the Ukrainian Commander-in-Chief General Syrskyi. On 18 October 2025, Russian forces employed a new modification of a guided aerial bomb, identified as the UMPB-5R reactive glide bomb, during a strike on the city of Lozova in Ukraine's Kharkiv region. According to the Kharkiv Regional Prosecutor's Office, the weapon was launched from an estimated distance of about 130 kilometres, marking the first recorded use of this munition against that city.
- H-2 SOW, H-4 SOW, Takbir and Azb REK are glide bombs developed by Pakistan. The H-4 may be a copy or a Pakistani variant of the Denel Raptor II glide bomb.
- HOPE/HOSBO are a family of glide bombs under development by German defence firm Diehl Defence.
- NPO Bazalt subsidiary of Russian company Tecmash is developing a glide cluster bomb PBK-500U Drel.
- UMPB D-30SN is a Russian glide bomb introduced in 2024.
- "Vyrivniuvach" or "Equalizer" or "Leveler" in English, is a Ukrainian guided glide bomb that can be carried by a range of aircraft. Featuring a 250kg warhead, it was designed to hit targets deep behind enemy lines.

== See also ==
- AGM-62 Walleye
- BLU-80/B Bigeye bomb
- Blue Boar
- DRDO Glide Bombs
- H-4 SOW
- JDAM-ER
- Kh-36 Grom-E2
- KGGB
- Paveway
- GBU-39 Small Diameter Bomb (SDB)
- GBU-53/B StormBreaker
- Takbir
- Umban/Al-Tariq
