= UMPK (bomb kit) =

Russian glide bomb kit

UMPK УМПК
- UMPK in Military Historical Museum of Artillery, Engineers and Signal Corps, Saint Petersburg
- Type: Glide bomb
- Place of origin: Russian Federation

Service history
- In service: 2023–present
- Used by: Russian Armed Forces
- Wars: Russo-Ukrainian war

The UMPK (Russian: УМПК; Унифицированный модуль планирования и коррекции, Unified gliding and correction module) is a munition guidance kit first developed by the Russian Bazalt Design Bureau for converting unguided Soviet bombs into precision-guided glide bombs. This kit is an aerial bomb glide range extension kit, similar to the American Joint Direct Attack Munition Extended Range (JDAM-ER) and thus it was sometime nicknamed "Russian JDAM". The guidance system and gliding function of the UMPK kit can provide ordinary aerial bombs with longer-range and more accurate strike capabilities. They have been widely used by the Russian Air Force during the Russo-Ukrainian war.

== History ==
A guided glide kit for Soviet/Russian bombs was first proposed by NPO Bazalt in 2002 as a low-cost device that could be fitted to bombs to increase their range and accuracy. Its prototype was first displayed at the Farnborough Airshow. The kit, then called the MPK, included four variants ranging in price and capabilities: the first module consisted of just retractable wings; the second added a simple inertial navigation system; the third included satellite navigation; and the fourth had a pulsejet engine. The project was displayed for several years but was never put into production, probably because the Russian military did not anticipate prolonged conflicts requiring large quantities of cheap armaments, and because Russian defense contractors preferred to produce more expensive and profitable guided bombs.

FAB-500 bombs with UMPK kits deploying their wings

At the beginning of January 2023, Russian users on social networks shared a photo of the FAB-500 M-62 with an attached kit resembling a JDAM. The "artisan" quality of the kit may have indicated it was a prototype.

At the end of March 2023, the spokesman of the Ukrainian Air Force, Yuriy Ignat, reported that the Russian military began to use winged modified aerial bombs with a warhead weighing 500 kg (1,100 lb) more often. Russian planes drop them from a distance of tens of kilometers on targets in the front-line zone without entering the Ukrainian air defense range.

In April 2023, an Su-34 accidentally dropped a bomb on the Russian city of Belgorod. Some news outlets quoted Russian milblogger Fighterbomber that the bomb was an UMPK-upgraded one.

The UMPK was first publicly acknowledged by Russian MoD in May 2023.

According to a November 2023 investigation by the British NGO Conflict Armament Research, the new UMPK has, among other things, a more complex electronic system including SMART navigation controller and Kometa satellite navigation module.

=== UMPB D-30SN ===
In March 2024, photos of the wreckage of a previously unseen Russian ordnance with the "UMPB" marking surfaced in Ukraine. Preliminary analysis of the wreckage told that UMPB is a type of air-launched weapon that has a FAB-250 bomb integrated into the guidance-and-glide kit, with inertial and satellite navigation systems, ailerons, and actuators at its aft end, with a jet engine and fuel tank inside the weapon as well. Russian milblogger Fighterbomber identified this weapon as UMPB D-30SN (Russian: УМПБ; Универсальный межвидовой планирующий боеприпас, Versatile intermediate gliding munition). According to the blogger, "intermediate" means its standing between different types of ordnance and the fact it can be launched from various platforms, such as Tornado-S multiple launch rocket systems, as well as from aircraft. No other specifications were mentioned.

In May 2024, a high-quality image of the UMPB D-30SN long-range glide bomb has appeared for the first time. The picture showed a Su-34 releasing four UMBP bombs. The location of the release point allowed to estimate that the attack range of the UMPB could be up to 90 km (56 mi), which is 20 to 30 km (12 to 19 mi) higher than the UMPK.

In October 2024, a piece of an UMPB was found in the wreckage of an S-70 UAV which was shot down by Russians after losing control and entering the Ukrainian airspace, indicating that the UAV was used as a carrier for UMPB bombs.

=== Ukrainian program ===
In June 2024, the Ukrainian Air Force announced a similar program to create an analog of the UMPK bombs. Serhii Golubtsov, commander of the Ukrainian Air Force, told Radio Free Europe/Radio Liberty in an interview, that the wings, command module and GPS had to be worked out. In August, the Ukrainian Air Force released footage of a Su-24M testing a similar bomb. This weapon appears to have X shaped control fins and an outlet for a possible rocket booster or a jet engine.

On 25 June 2025, Ukrainian defense contractor KB Medoid unveiled a glide bomb kit for FAB-500 bombs with a range of 60 kilometers. The kit closely mirrors the UMPK and was likely reverse-engineered from captured Russian kits. The developers plan to integrate French technology to avoid satellite jamming and to increase the range up to 80 kilometers.

=== Ukrainian countermeasures ===
In 2025, WarTranslated author Dmitri Masinski reported on a leak from Russian pilot Fighterbomber on Telegram that Ukrainian forces had begun jamming Russian UMPK-equipped glide bombs, significantly reducing their accuracy, causing Russia to need up to 16 bombs to hit a target. David Axe reported on this for Forbes, adding that the jamming additionally had disrupted Russian drones, forcing a switch to fiber-optics.

In October 2025, Ukraine was testing a new interception system that combined drones, radar and artificial intelligence to shot down UMPK-equipped glide bombs. The General Staff of the Armed Forces of Ukraine claimed to have destroyed over 100 UMPK glide bombs between September and October 2025.

== Description ==
The UMPK aerial bomb glide kit is designed to convert traditional unguided bombs into precision-guided munitions to provide greater strike accuracy. It is a welded structure featuring two deployable wings and tail control surfaces. It functions as a self-contained flight assembly to which an aerial bomb is attached, with or without a nose fairing. The maximum attack range depends on the altitude and trajectory of the aircraft at the moment of release.

Unlike the similar American JDAM kit, the UMPK can be fitted to a bomb in field conditions, rather than at a factory or a specialized workshop, as there is no need to replace a bomb's tail section.

After the bomb is released, the wings are deployed by a spring-loaded mechanism actuated by a pyrotechnic charge. The weapon is guided to its target by a navigation module that uses signals from both an inertial navigation system and a jam-resistant Kometa-M GPS/GLONASS antenna. Control signals are sent to two servomotors that actuate the tail surfaces. The system is powered by two batteries.

The current manufacturer of the module is not officially named. Perhaps there are several companies producing them, as well as several variants of the module itself.

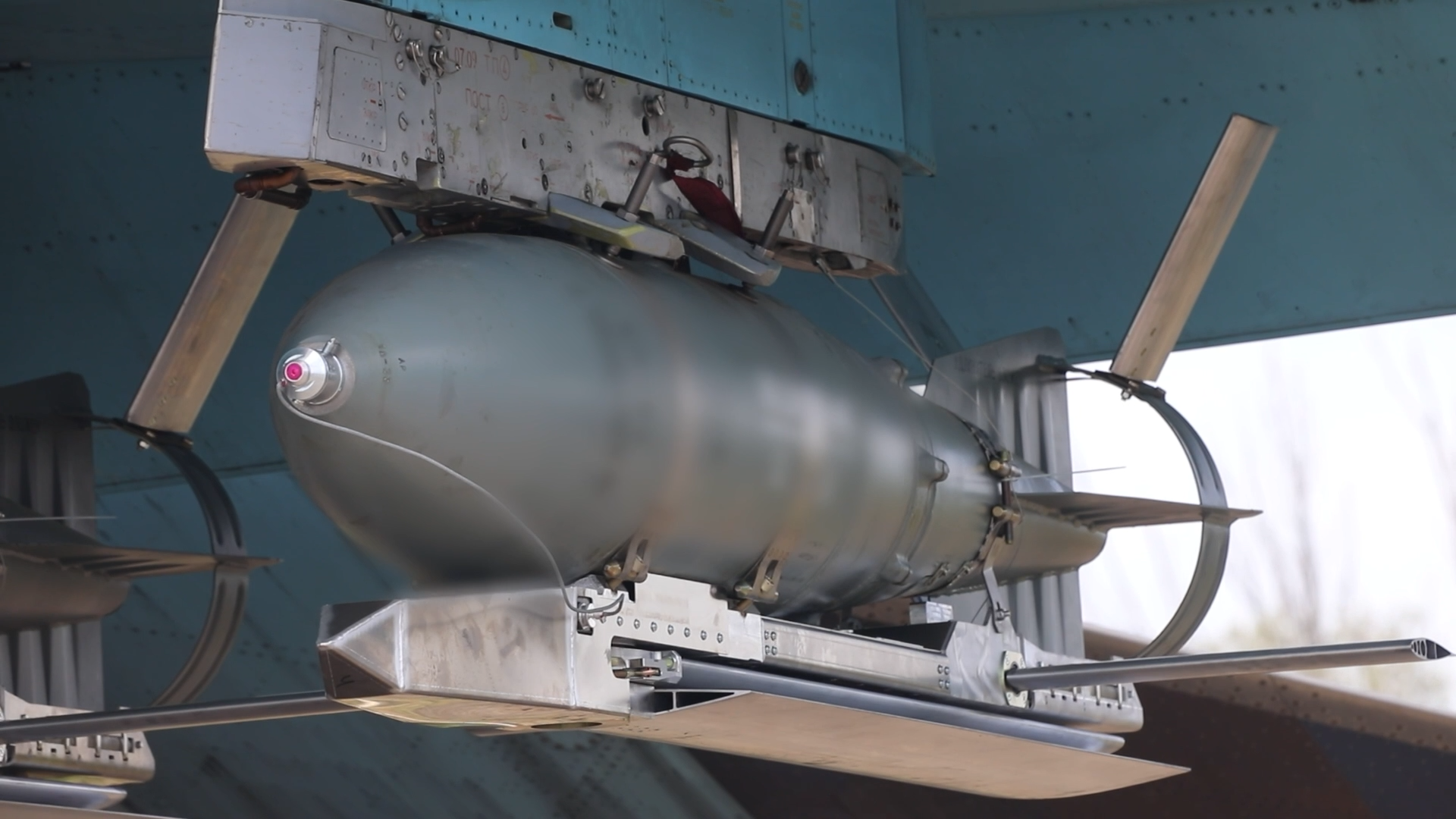
FAB-500T with a UMPK kit

A unit costs 2 million Rubles (24,460 USD as of 2025), according to the Telegram blogger Fighterbomber, which is relatively inexpensive for a guided weapon. During its invasion of Ukraine, Russia is unlikely to run out of bombs to which it can be fitted, as it has a very large inventory of unguided aerial bombs. The heavy use of civilian-grade electronics allows kits to be mass produced cheaply but also makes them unreliable compared to Western equivalents resulting in bombs falling within Russia, although safeguard systems mean detonations are rare.

Ukrainian media often refers to Russian UMPK-equipped bombs as "KABs", which is not accurate since KAB is a guided bomb, while the UMPK is a kit that gets attached to unguided bombs such as FAB.

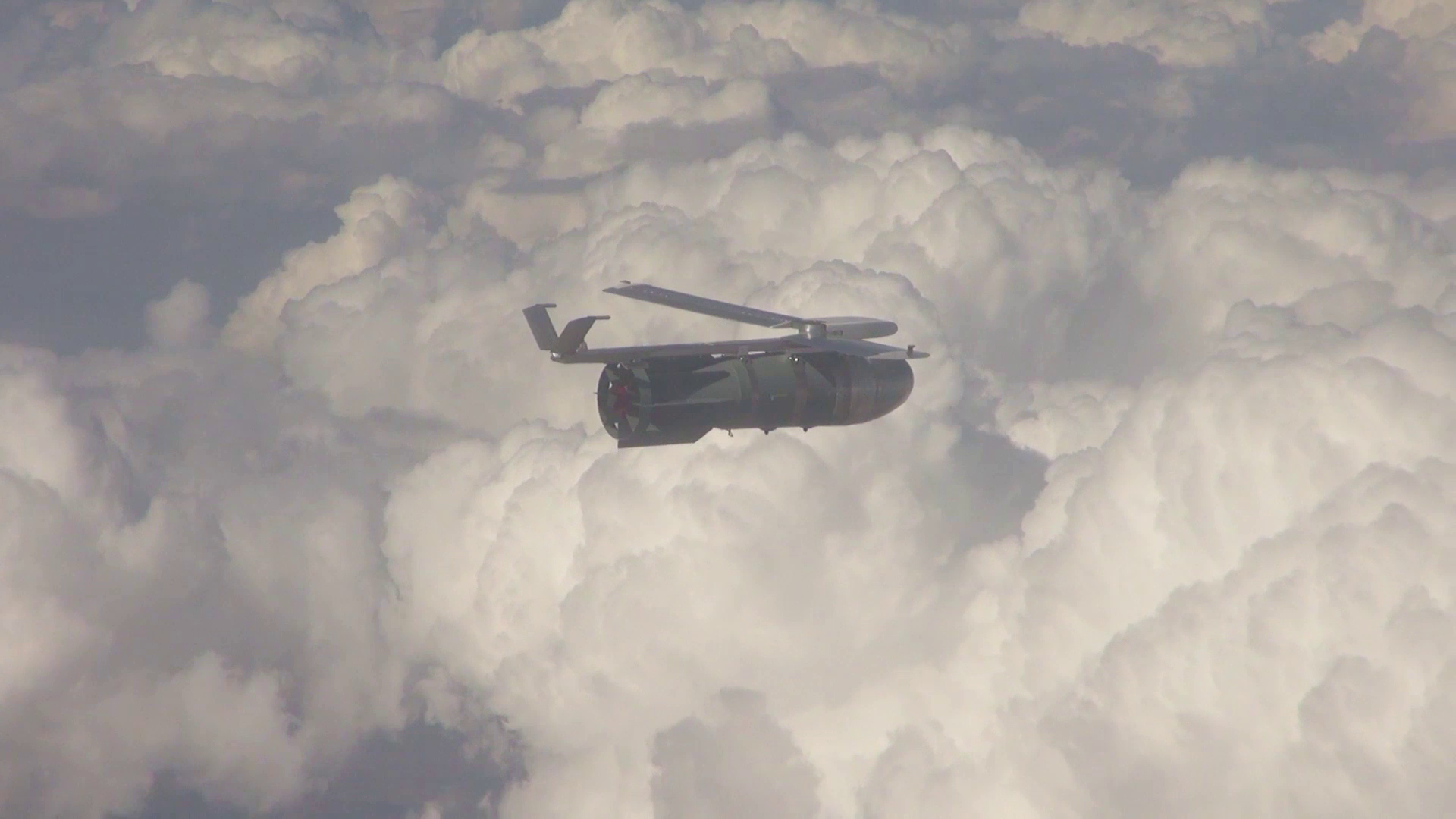
FAB-3000 with a UMPK kit

There are several variants of the kit:

- FAB-250 – used at least as early as May 2023.
- FAB-500 – the first bomb equipped with the UMPK, and the most widely used.
- FAB-1500 – used at least as early as September 2023. The FAB-1500М54 guided bomb was displayed publicly when Russian Defense Minister Sergey Shoigu visited the Tactical Missiles Corporation military-industrial complex in the Moscow region in January 2024.
- FAB-3000 – On 20 June 2024, Russian milblogger FighterBomber published the alleged first usage of a FAB-3000 with UMPK kit in the village of Liptsy, Kharkiv region. The Kyiv Independent also reported on this claim, although they could not verify its veracity. More purported uses of the bomb in the same region took place in the next days with videos appeared online. The Russian Ministry of Defense officially announced the use of the bomb on 14 July 2024 by publishing a video which showed a Su-34 tactical bomber launching it.
- ODAB-500 – footage in a video published by the Russian Defense Ministry on April 4, 2024, shows a Su-34 frontline bomber launching four ODAB-500 thermobaric bombs equipped with the UMPK guidance kit.
- ODAB-1500 – used at least as early as February 2024.
- RBK-500 – the cluster variant used at least as early as November 2023.

== Notable uses ==
- Forbes magazine stated in August 2023 that the large-scale use of Russian guided bombs greatly hindered the Ukrainian counteroffensive on the Zaporizhzhia front.
- FAB-1500 was claimed to have been used to strike the Antonovskiy Bridge in Kherson.

== See also ==
- Soviet and Russian aerial bombs
- JDAM Extended Range - American glide bomb kit
- LS-6 - Chinese glide bomb kit
