= FAB-250 =

250 Kg unguided aerial bomb

FAB-250 M-62 General Purpose (GP) Bomb
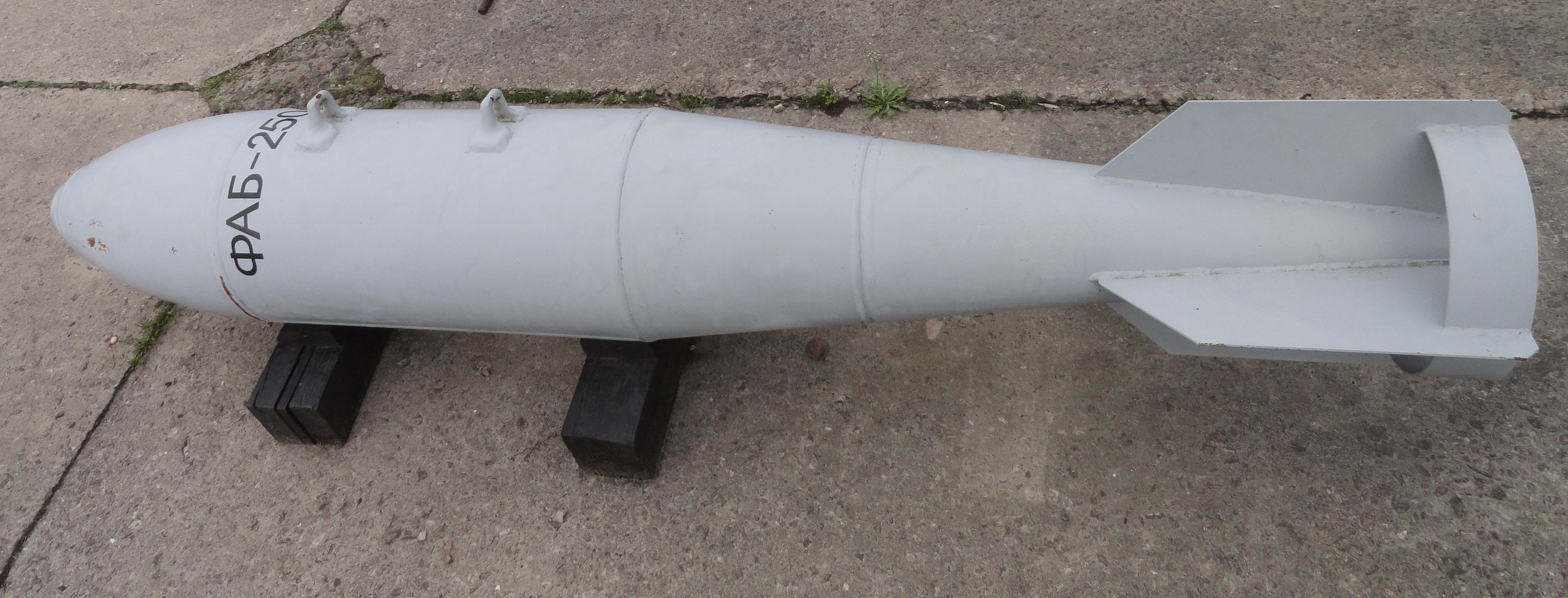
- FAB-250 M-62
- Type: High-drag and low-drag general-purpose bomb
- Place of origin: Soviet Union

Production history
- Produced: 1946–? (M-46) 1954–present; (M-54); 1962–present (M-62)
- Variants: KAB-250

Specifications
- Mass: 250 kilograms (551 lb)
- Length: 1.92 m
- Diameter: 0.3 m
- Filling: High explosive
- Filling weight: 100 kg
- Detonation mechanism: Impact fuse

The FAB-250 is a Soviet-designed 250-kilogram (550 lb) general purpose air-dropped bomb with a high-explosive warhead, primarily used by the Russian Air Force, former Soviet republics and customer countries. It is very widespread throughout the Third World and used in many conflicts in Asia and Africa among others. The original M-46 model was rolled out in 1946, followed by the M-54 model 1954 with reinforced structure, both models shaped for internal carriage by heavy bombers, a low-drag M-62 version in 1962 was intended for fighter bomber external hardpoint carriage. The bomb is unguided, features a single nose fuse, and is compatible with most models of Soviet aircraft. The FAB-250 was extensively employed over Afghanistan by Soviet and allied Afghan forces during the 1980s. As of 2017, the FAB-250 had been used most recently over Syria by both Russian and Syrian warplanes. Ethiopia used it during the Tigray War. Ukraine equipped light aircraft with automated controls to be able to drop FAB-250 bombs on Russian energy infrastructure over 800 km from line of control in the Russo-Ukrainian War.

During the 2022 Russian invasion of Ukraine Russia adapted FAB-250 bombs and equipped them with planning and correction modules (UMPK) containing Inertial navigation system similar to the adaptions made to FAB-500 M-62 bombs, the FAB-250 M-62 is lighter and more aerodynamic than the heavier FAB-500 M-62, which means it is less destructive but has a longer gliding range which has been stated as 80 kilometres, this reduces the likelihood of Russian aircraft when deploying the adapted bombs of being hit by Ukrainian Surface-to-air missile systems.

According to the Institute for the Study of War FAB-250 bombs "weigh 250 kilograms, hold an explosive weight of 99 kilograms, have a damage radius of 120 meters, and can destroy manpower, equipment, and light fortifications."

On 29 January 2025, Bloomberg reported that Russian oil shipments through the port of Ust-Luga were suspended due to an overnight strike by Ukrainian drones. The SBU claimed the Andreapol oil pumping station was struck. The is part of the Baltic Pipeline System-II run by Transneft, a Russian state owned company. A fire and oil spill were reported. The attack is noted for using drones that dropped FAB-250 M-54 bombs. Which indicates a reusable drone instead of a “kamikaze-type”.

== Variants ==
- FAB-250 M-46 – 1946 model, original high-drag model intended for internal carriage on heavy bombers, thin walls.
- FAB-250 M-54 – 1954 model, improved high-drag model with reinforced structure.
- FAB-250 M-62 – 1962 model, low-drag model designed for external carriage on hardpoints on fighter-bombers.

== See also ==
- FAB-500
- Mark 82 bomb - American counterpart
- Soviet and Russian aerial bombs
