= H-4 SOW =

H-4
- Type: Precision-guided glide bomb Air-to-surface missile
- Place of origin: Pakistan

Service history
- In service: 2003–present
- Used by: Pakistan Air Force
- Wars: 2019 India–Pakistan border skirmishes; Operation Swift Retort

Production history
- Manufacturer: NESCOM

Specifications
- Warhead: High explosives
- Engine: Solid propellant booster (rocketry)
- Operational range: 120 km
- Guidance system: Electro-optical (infrared homing)
- Launch platform: Dassault Mirage-III: ROSE Variants; Dassault Mirage-V: ROSE Variants; PAC JF-17 Thunder

The H-4 SOW (Stand-Off Weapon) is a precision-guided glide bomb manufactured by Pakistan's National Engineering & Scientific Commission (NESCOM) and deployed by the Pakistan Air Force (PAF). It is capable of striking targets at standoff range. It has a terminal guidance system based on an infrared homing seeker, which identifies the target during the final stage of flight. Designed to hit targets out to 120 km, the bomb may have the capability to evade radar.

== Design & Development ==
According to Pakistani press reports, the H-4 glide bomb was created by Pakistan's National Engineering and Scientific Commission (NESCOM), working in collaboration with the Pakistan Missile Organisation and Air Weapons Complex in Pakistan. A lighter version of the H-4 has also been produced, the H-2 SOW, which has a stated range of 60 km.

Three successful tests were conducted, the last one in 2003, which led to field deployment on the Dassault Mirage III and Mirage V strike fighters of the Pakistan Air Force. It has also been stated that the H-4 will be integrated with the PAF's new multi-role combat aircraft, the JF-17, which is replacing the elderly fleet of Mirage III and Dassault Mirage 5 aircraft. All Pakistani JF-17 fighters, from the initial JF-17 Block 1 model to the final Block 3 version, will be capable of launching the H-4.

The H-4's stated range of 120 km and its glide bomb design has led to speculation that it may be a Pakistani variant of the Denel Raptor II glide bomb, which is also guided by an infrared homing seeker and has a range of 120 km and is a longer range version of Raptor also known as H2.

== Operational history ==
On 27 February 2019, 2 Pakistani Dassault Mirage-VPAs armed with H-4 SOW bombs and 2 Dassault Mirage-IIIDAs for guidance via data link carried out airstrikes in Jammu and Kashmir targeting Indian Army brigade headquarters and forward support depots. The Pakistan Air Force claimed that the planes were able to lock onto the targets, however at the last moment, Weapon systems officers took their cursor off them. This was shown by what were allegedly in-cockpit videos released by the PAF's operations directorate for the 6 September telecast which showed that the Air force did not target the Indian army sites.

Later in April 2019, Indian media reported that a local police Bomb disposal unit carried out a bomb defusal operation in Mendhar and Rajouri, where they had successfully defused 3-4 unexploded H-4 SOW bombs.

== Operators ==
- Pakistan: Pakistan Air force

== See also ==
- H-2 SOW – (Pakistan): Lighter Variant of the H-4.
- GBU-53/B – (United States)
- AGM-154 Joint Standoff Weapon – (United States)
