= H-2 SOW =

H-2
- Type: Precision-guided glide bomb
- Place of origin: Pakistan

Service history
- In service: 2003
- Used by: Pakistan Air Force

Production history
- Manufacturer: NESCOM

Specifications
- Warhead: High explosives
- Operational range: 60 km
- Guidance system: Electro-optical (TV or infra-red imaging)
- Launch platform: Combat aircraft

The H-2 SOW (Stand-Off Weapon) is a precision-guided glide bomb manufactured by NESCOM and deployed by the Pakistan Air Force, capable of striking targets at stand-off range. It has a terminal guidance system based on an infra-red imaging seeker which identifies the target during the final stage of flight. Designed to hit targets out to 60 km, the bomb may be able to evade radar.

According to a Pakistani source, the H-2 is a lighter version of the H-4 SOW. The H-4 is reported by the Pakistani press to have been created by Pakistan's National Engineering and Scientific Commission (NESCOM), working in collaboration with the Pakistan Missile Organisation and Air Weapons Complex in Pakistan.

== Operational history ==
The H-2 is stated to have entered service with the Pakistan Air Force in 2003.

A television-guided version of the H-2 was launched at a mock target from a distance of 60 km by Mirage III/5 fighters of the Pakistan Air Force during a firepower demonstration on 6 April 2010, marking the first phase of the Pakistan Air Force exercise High Mark 2010.

== See also ==
- Sadid-345 – (Iran)
