= Razon =

Razon is a Spanish surname, meaning "reason". Notable people with the surname include:

- Alfredo Fernando Razon Gonzalez (born 1978), Filipino footballer
- Avelino Razon (born 1952), Filipino police officer and politician
- Daniel Razon (born 1967), the current Overall Servant of the Members Church of God International
- Delia Razon (born 1931), Filipina actress
- Enrique K. Razon (born 1960), Filipino billionaire
- Henedina Razon (1955–2017), Filipina politician
- Jielo Razon (born 1999), Filipino basketball player
- Martin Ramon Razon Nievera (born 1962), Filipino singer and television host
