= Takbir bomb =

Pakistan-designed GPS bomb guidance kit

Takbir
- Place of origin: Pakistan

Service history
- In service: 2017–present
- Used by: Pakistan Air Force
- Wars: Operation Swift Retort

Production history
- Designer: GIDS
- Designed: 2010–15
- Manufacturer: GIDS

Specifications
- Mass: 250 kilograms (550 lb)
- Effective firing range: 60 kilometres (37 mi)
- Guidance system: Inertial guidance/GPS
- Launch platform: JF-17 Thunder

The Takbir bomb is a range-extension kit (REK) and weapons-guidance kit that is intended to convert the unguided ordnance into all-weather precision-guided munitions (PGMs). Its functions are based on the American Joint Direct Attack Munition (JDAM) system and it features as a winged glide bomb, with internal guidance. It was revealed by Pakistani firm, GIDS, to the public in 2014.

== History ==
It was announced at the International Defence Exhibition and Seminar in 2014. It is unknown if it is a conversion of an existing dumb bomb, a field add-on kit for existing bombs, or a new and integrated weapon. It resembles a typical dumb with an added dorsal housing and a pair of fold-out wings. There is also an extended nose. The guidance system is unknown but has been described as both GPS-based, inertial guidance and possibly having some form of optical terminal guidance.

Pakistan has previously used the Chinese LS-6 glide bomb with their JF-17 Thunder aircraft. The Takbir appears to be an indigenously produced development of the LS-6, although the nose extension is a new feature. A weapon test in March 2019 involving the JF-17 may have been the first public test of the Takbir, although details in the released video were blacked out.

The bomb has a range of about 80 to 100 km, and it can carry 200 to 250 kg of explosive material. The bomb can be guided through a satellite or launched from an aircraft. A fighter pilot launching the bomb can add or modify information about the target. As it is fired from an aircraft, its folded wings unfold and it glides towards its target. It can dodge obstacles obstructing its path toward its destination. Its flight system is based on gliding, by using the bomb's inertia. By using this bomb, a pilot can hit their target without entering an enemy's territory.

=== Operational use ===
The smart bomb was seen being fired from a JF-17 Thunder during a live firing exercise by the Pakistan Air Force in 2019.

== Operators ==
- Pakistan
  - Pakistan Air Force

== Specifications ==
- Range: 80–100 km
- Weight: 250 kg

== See also ==
- JDAM
