= Soviet and Russian aerial bombs =

Soviet and Russian bombs for aircraft

Soviet Union and Russian Federation developed a range of aerial bombs for use on its aircraft.

== Naming ==
The name of the bomb consists of the type of bomb (FAB-250M-46), its caliber in kilograms (FAB-250M-46), model by year of adoption (FAB-250M-46 - model 1946) and additionally (not always) an indication of its mass - if it differs significantly from the caliber (OFAB-250-270, FAB-1500-2600TS) and/or the design feature of the bomb or its production technology (FAB-500T - heat-resistant (термостойкая; termostoykaya), FAB-1500-2600TS - thick-walled (толстостенная; tolstostennaya), FAB-100sch - steel cast iron (сталистый чугун; stalistyy chugun), FAB-1000sl - steel casting (стальное литьё; stal'noye lit'yo), or for commercial purposes (KAB-500S-E - export).

=== Bomb types ===
"AB" (АБ) in FAB stands for "aerial bomb" (авиационная бомба)

==== Main purpose ====
- FAB (ФАБ) - high explosive
- OFAB (ОФАБ) - high-explosive fragmentation
- OFZAB (ОФЗАБ) - high-explosive fragmentation incendiary
- OAB, AO, ShOAB (ОАБ, АО, ШОАБ) - fragmentation
- ZAB/ZARP (ЗАБ/ЗАРП) - incendiary
- ZB (ЗБ) - incendiary tank
- ODAB (ОДАБ) - volumetric detonating
- FAB-TS (TS - thick-walled), KAB-Pr (Pr - Penetrating) (ФАБ-ТС, КАБ-Пр) - penetrating high-explosive
- BetAB (also - BETAB) (БетАБ) - concrete-breaking
- BrAB (also BRAB) (БрАБ) - armor-piercing
- PTAB (ПТАБ) - anti-tank
- PLAB/MPLAB/GB (ПЛАБ/МПЛАБ/ГБ) - naval anti-submarine aircraft bomb / depth bomb
- KhAB/KhB (ХАБ/ХБ) - chemical
- AK (АК) (round [glass] ampoule)/AZH (АЖ) (tin ampoule) - chemical ampoule (also filled with self-igniting incendiary liquid KS)
- KrAB-yad (КрАБ-яд) (poison) (also - CRAB-yad (КРАБ-яд)) - a smoking aerial bomb of toxic smoke
- AOKh (АОХ) - chemical-fragmentation
- KAB (КАБ) - guided bomb (KAB-Kr - television [homing head/seeker], KAB-LG - laser head [semi-active laser seeker], KAB-S - inertial seeker with satellite correction)
- RBK (РБК) - disposable bomb cluster (cluster bomb)
- RBS (РБС) - one-time bomb bundle

=== Auxiliary and special ===
- SAB (САБ) - luminous (lighting)
- DAB (ДАБ) - smoke
- IAB (ИАБ) - simulation
- ASK (АСК) - aviation rescue cassette
- MGAB (МГАБ) - marine hydroacoustic (explosive sound source - VIZ)
- ASP (АСП) - aviation fire extinguishing agent
- AgitAB (АгитАБ) (also AGITAB) - agitation
- P, PAB (П, ПАБ) - practical
- M (М) - target
- UPLAB (УПЛАБ) - anti-submarine training
- FotAB (ФотАБ) (also FOTAB) - photographic
- NOSAB (НОСАБ) - night orientation signal
- DOSAB (ДОСАБ) - daytime reference signal
- OMAB-D (ОМАБ-Д) - sea-orientation (daytime)
- OMAB-N (ОМАБ-Н) - sea-orientation (night)
  Some popular sizes and types, left to right: 1.FAB-100 2.FAB-250 3.FAB-250M46 4.OFAB-250 5.FAB-500M54 6.FAB-500 7. FAB-500M62 8.FAB-5000

== Models and types ==
=== High explosive ===
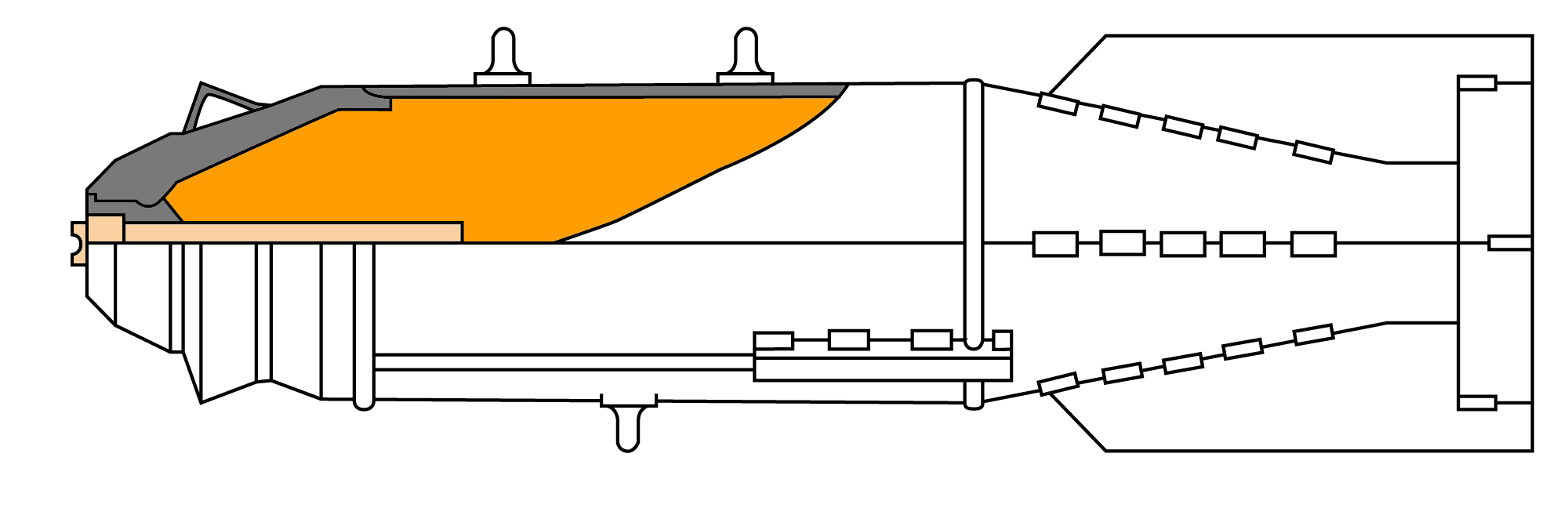
FAB with short body
Detonator

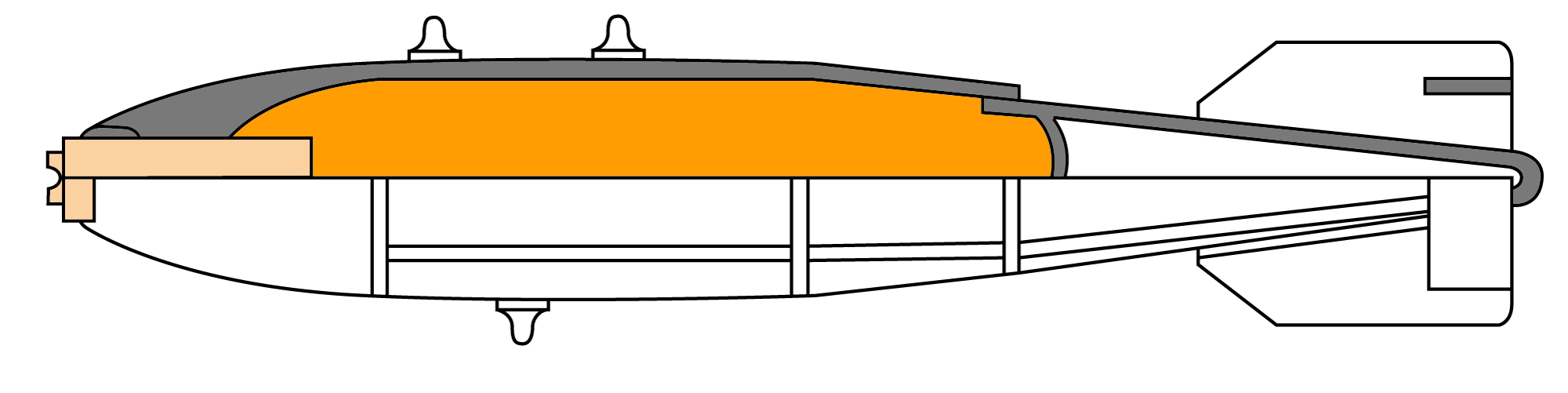
FAB high elongation
Explosive

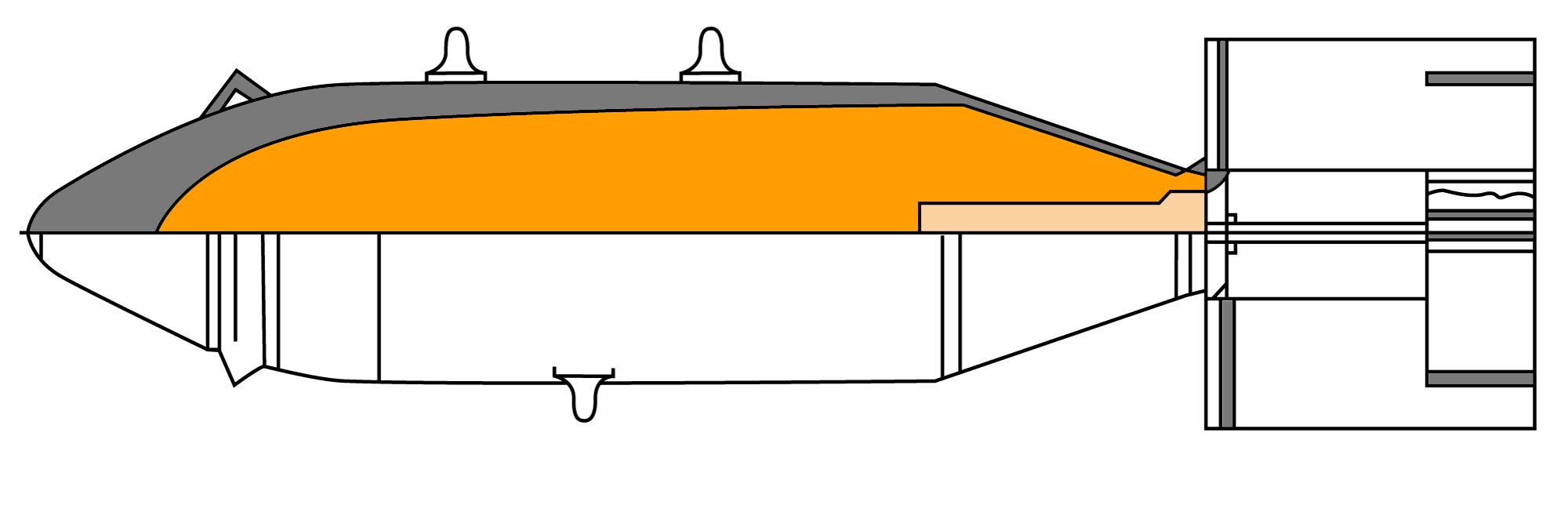
FAB Thick-walled
Body

High-explosive aerial bombs (FAB) are aerial bombs whose main destructive effect is the effect of an explosion. They have the most powerful and versatile lethal effect among main-purpose aerial bombs. The mass of the explosive in the bomb is approximately 50% of its weight, and the bomb also has a relatively strong body for penetration into the ground or into obstacles such as the floors of buildings and structures.

Main destructive forces:

- Gaseous explosion products with high overpressure
- Shock waves in air or soil and seismic waves
- Fragments from crushing the bomb body.

Primary targets:

- Logistics and communications facilities
- Military-industrial and energy facilities
- Combat vehicles
- Living force.

Modern general-purpose FABs weigh 250 kg or more. They can have several forms:

- Blunt nosed (Тупоконечная) - designed for the most efficient placement inside the fuselage. Dropped at near- and subsonic speeds and altitudes of up to 15–16 km.
- High elongation (Большого удлинения) - they have a streamlined head section, designed mainly for aircraft with external suspension, including supersonic ones. They have less drag and are more stable.
- Thick-walled (TS index) - Designed for deployment against particularly strong targets (reinforced concrete weapons depots, equipment parking lots, runways, dams). Such bombs are distinguished by a more massive and durable head part, a thicker body, and the absence of a head point for the fuse and a fuse cup.

High explosive
| Abbreviation | Image | Diameter (mm) | Length (mm) | Bomb mass (kg) | Explosive mass (kg) | Notes |
|---|---|---|---|---|---|---|
| ФАБ-50ЦК | | 219 | 936 | 60 | 25 | Solid forged |
| ФАБ-100 | | 267 | 964 | 100 | 70 (together with warhead) | |
| ФАБ-250 | | 285 | 1589 | 250 | 99 | |
| ФАБ-250-М54 | | 325 | 1795 | 268 | 97 | |
| ФАБ-250-М62 | | 300 | 1924 | 227 | 100 | |
| ФАБ-250ТС | | 300 | 1500 | 256 | 61,4 | Thick-walled, Armor penetration 1 m |
| ФАБ-250ШЛ | | 325 | 1965 | 266 | 137 | Assault, surface explosion |
| ФАБ-500 | | 392 | 2142 | 500 | 213 | |
| ФАБ-500Т | | 400 | 2425 | 477 | 191 | Heat resistant |
| ФАБ-500-M54 | | 450 | 1790 | 528 | 201 | |
| ФАБ-500-M62 | | 400 | 2425 | 500 | 200 | |
| ФАБ-500ШН | | 450 | 2190 | 513 | 221 | Assault, Low-altitude |
| ФАБ-500ШЛ | | 450 | 2220 | 515 | 221 | Assault, surface explosion |
| ФАБ-1000 | | - | - | - | - | |
| ФАБ-1500 | | 580 | 3000 | 1400 | 1200 (with warhead) | |
| ФАБ-1500Т | | - | - | 1488 | 870 | Heat resistant |
| ФАБ-1500-2500ТС | | - | - | 2151 | 436 | Thick-walled, armor penetration 2500 mm |
| ФАБ-1500-М54 | | - | - | 1550 | 675,6 | |
| ФАБ-2000 | | - | - | - | - | |
| ФАБ-3000 | | - | - | 3067 | 1387 | |
| ФАБ-3000-М46 | | - | - | 3000 | 1400 | |
| ФАБ-3000-М54 | | - | - | 3067 | 1200 | |
| ФАБ-5000 | | 642 | 3107 | 4900 | 2207 | |
| ФАБ-5000-М54 | | - | - | 5247 | 2210,6 | |
| ФАБ-9000-М54 | | 1200 | 5050 | 9407 | 4297 | |

=== High-explosive fragmentation ===
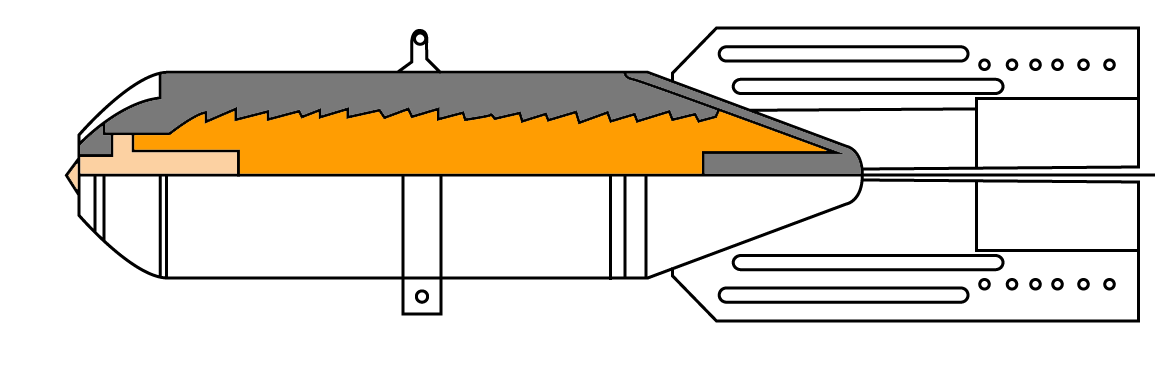
OFAB cutaway Detonator Explosive Body

OFAB - a high-explosive fragmentation bomb is a regular high-explosive bomb, but with a lower explosive filling of about 30-35%, and special means of organized crushing of the body, such as a sawtooth inner side of the body or a system of longitudinal and transverse grooves (although on outdated models they might not have been installed).

Primary targets:

- Military-industrial facilities
- Living force.
- Combat vehicles

High-explosive fragmentation
| Abbreviation | Image | Diameter (mm) | Length (mm) | Bomb mass (kg) | Explosive mass (kg) | Notes |
|---|---|---|---|---|---|---|
| ОФАБ-100-120 | | 273 | 1300 | 133 | 42 | |
| ОФАБ-250Т | | 300 | 2050 | 239 | 92 | Heat resistant |
| ОФАБ-250ШЛ | | 325 | 1991 | 266 | 92 | Assault, surface explosion |
| ОФАБ-250-270 | | 325 | 1456 | 266 | 97 | |
| ОФАБ-250ШН | | 325 | 1966 | 268 | 93 | Assault, Low-altitude |
| ОФАБ-500У | | 400 | 2300 | 515 | 159 | Universal |
| ОФАБ-500ШР | | 450 | 2500 | 509 | 125 | Assault, with multiple warheads |

=== Concrete-piercing and anti-submarine ===
BetAB - a concrete-piercing aerial bomb. Designed for effective destruction of reinforced concrete shelters and runways. Structurally, they are divided into two types:

- Free fall - designed for bombing from high altitudes. Structurally close to thick-walled high-explosive bombs.
- With a parachute and a jet accelerator - designed for bombing from any (including low) altitudes. Due to the parachute, the bomb tilts to 60°, the parachute is unfastened and the rocket accelerator is turned on.

PLAB - anti-submarine bomb. Designed to destroy submarines. May have different designs. Large-caliber bombs usually have a non-contact (hydroacoustic, barometric, remote, or more often combined) fuse, and hit the target with a high-explosive effect (hydrodynamic shock) at a distance. A low-power nuclear charge is well suited for them (as an example, the domestic PLAB 5F48 “Skalp”).

Small-caliber bombs are usually used as part of cassettes and have a contact fuse and a shaped charge bomb design.

Concrete-piercing and anti-submarine
| Abbreviation | Image | Diameter (mm) | Length (mm) | Bomb mass (kg) | Explosive mass (kg) | Notes |
|---|---|---|---|---|---|---|
| БетАБ-500 | | 350 | 2200 | 477 | 76 | |
| БетАБ-500ШП | | 325 | 2500 | 380 | 77 | Assault, with jet accelerator |
| БетАБ-500У | | 450 | 2480 | 510 | 45 | |
| ПЛАБ-250-120 | | 240 | 1500 | 123 | 61 | |

=== Incendiary and volume-detonating ===
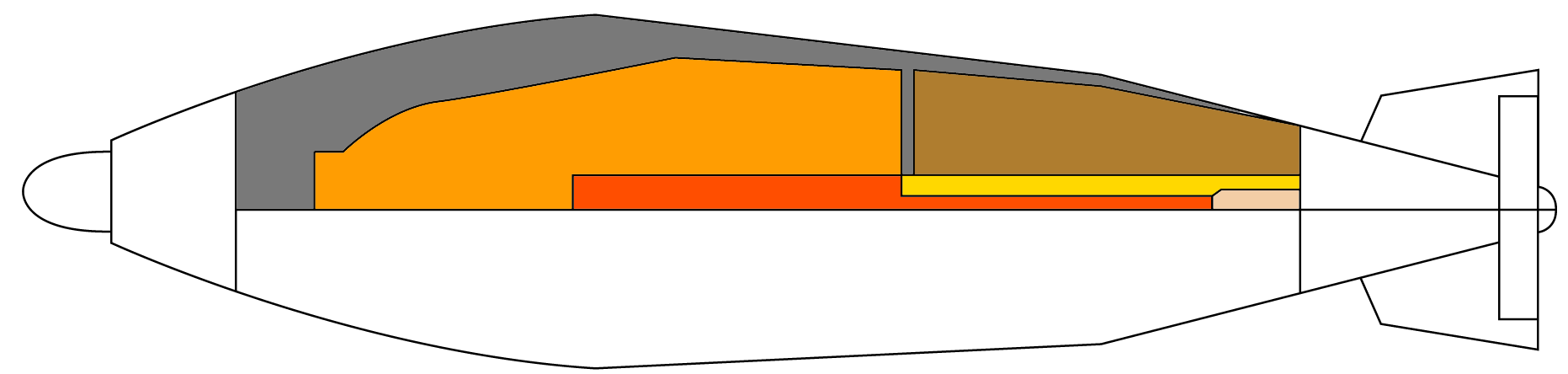
FZAB Detonator Explosive Explosive charge Cartridge with phosphorus Fire mixture Body

ZAB - incendiary aerial bomb. Designed to destroy manpower and military equipment with fire. The mass of incendiary bombs does not exceed 500 kg. Structurally, incendiary bombs are divided into 2 types:

- With pyrotechnic incendiary composition - used in all bombs less than 100 kg, and in some with a caliber of more than 100. The pyrotechnic composition is usually thermite with a binder. The body usually consists of combustible metal "electron" (an alloy of aluminum and magnesium).
- With a viscous fire mixture - used for bombs with a caliber of 100 to 500 kg. A fire mixture is organic flammable substances thickened to a viscous state with special substances (rubber, liquid glass, polystyrene). The fire mixture in a thickened state is dispersed during an explosion into large pieces, which burn for several minutes at a temperature of about 1000 °C. The design of the bomb also includes a cartridge with phosphorus and a small explosive charge; after detonation, the phosphorus spontaneously ignites in air and ignites the fire mixture.
- FZAB - high-explosive incendiary bomb. They are a combination of FAB and ZAB in one body. When a bomb is detonated, the incendiary part detonates first, and then the high-explosive part.
- ZB - incendiary tank. They are ZAB in a thin-walled casing without a stabilizer and without an explosive charge. Scattering and crushing is carried out by means of a hydraulic shock that occurs when it hits an obstacle. They can only be used effectively from low altitudes.

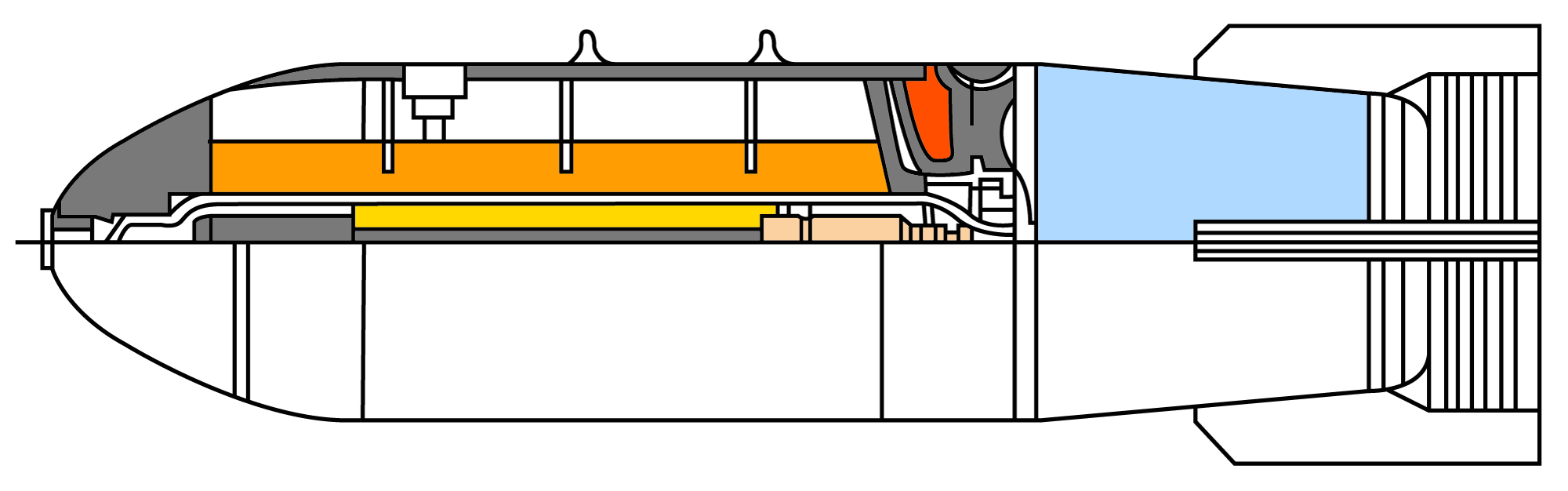
ODAB Fuse Dispersing charge Equipment Secondary (initiating) charge Body Container with parachute

ODAB - volume detonating bomb. Provides greater effect against manpower and vulnerable equipment (including in open shelters) than FAB. When encountering an obstacle, the dispersing charge is activated, the body is destroyed, the fuel splits and scatters. The fuel evaporates and, mixing with air, forms a cloud of air-fuel mixture. After the time required for the formation of a cloud of sufficient size, the secondary detonating explosive charge ignites the air-fuel mixture.

Incendiary and volume-detonating
| Abbreviation | Image | Diameter (mm) | Length (mm) | Bomb mass (kg) | Explosive mass (kg) | Notes |
|---|---|---|---|---|---|---|
| ЗАБ-100-105 | | 273 | 1065 | 106,9 | 28,5 | |
| ЗАБ-250-200 | | 325 | 1500 | 202 | 60 | |
| ЗБ-500ШМ | | 500 | 2500 | 317 | 260 | |
| ЗБ-500ГД | | 500 | 2500 | 270-340 (depending on the type of fire mixture) | 218-290 | |
| ФЗАБ-500М | | 400 | 2500 | 500 | 86+49 (Explosive+fire mixture) | |
| ОФЗАБ-500 | | 450 | 2500 | 500 | 250 | |
| ОДАБ-500ПМ | | 500 | 2280 | 520 | 193 | |
| АВБПМ | | - | | | 7100 (44,000 kg TNT equivalent) | |

=== Cluster ===
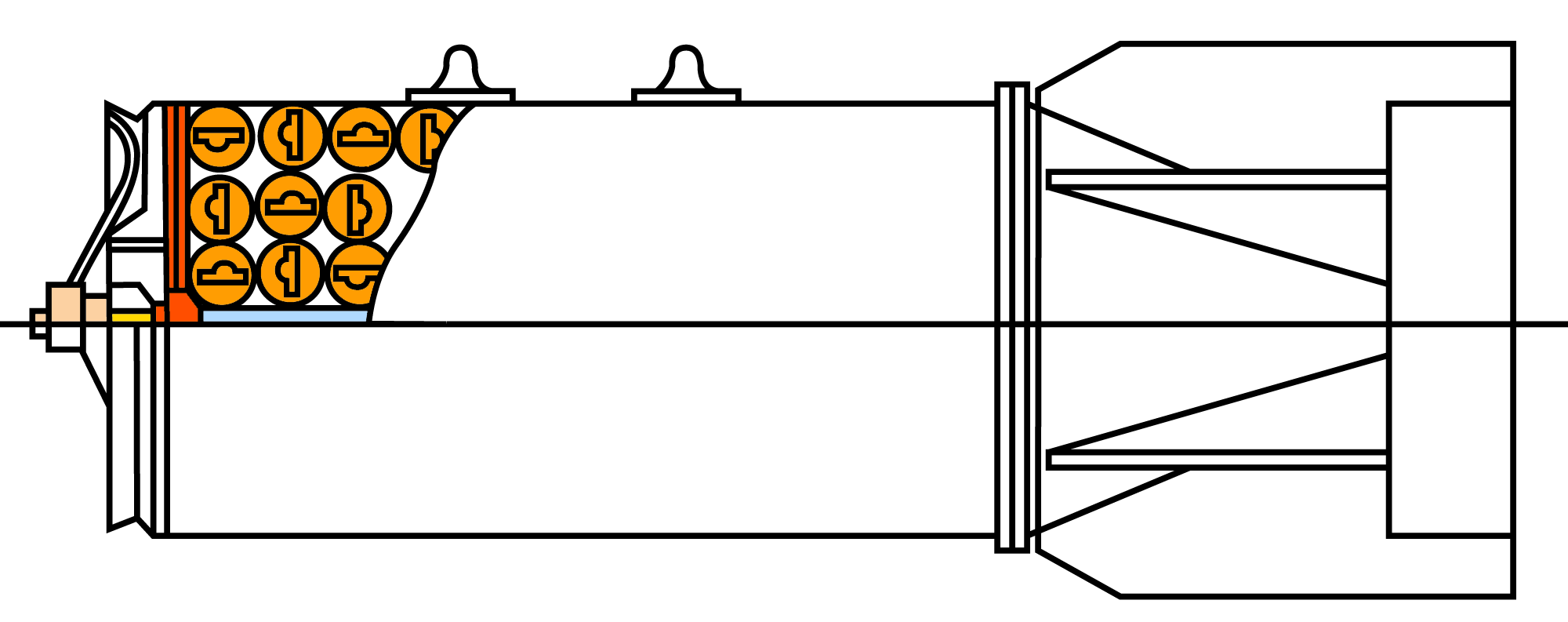
RBK of obturator type. Cylindrical metal shell (Стакан) Cluster elements Obturator disc Central tube Knockout charge

RBK - disposable bomb clusters. They are thin-walled aerial bombs, designed for the use of small-caliber aerial bombs (up to 20 kg). The name consists of an abbreviation and type of equipment. Some RBKs are equipped with a removable fairing, which allows the RBC to be effectively installed on aircraft with both an external sling and an internal weapons bay. Based on the method of dispersing combat elements, RBKs are divided into two types:

- obturator type - have in their design a rigidly fixed obturator disk, which, after the remote fuse is triggered and the expelling charge is ignited by it under the action of powder gases, is separated from the glass and moves inside the bomb body along with the central pipe around which small aerial bombs are placed. The tail cone is separated, and the combat elements extend beyond the cassette.
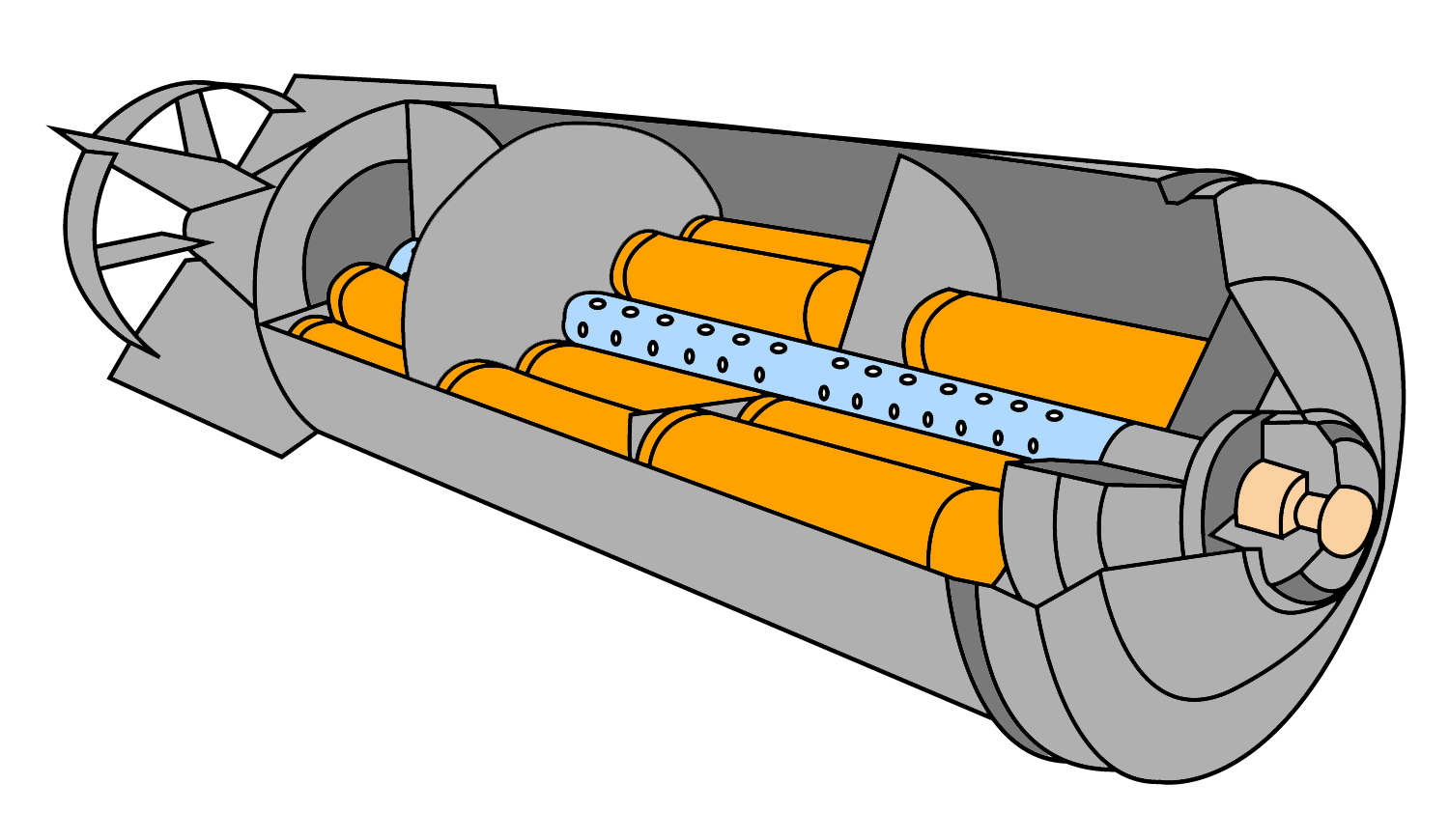
- Sectional view of RBK with central ignition-explosive charge (RBK-250 ZAB2.5M) Cylindrical metal shell (Стакан) Cluster elements Central tube with ignition-explosive charge inside Body
  with a central ignition-explosive charge - the bomb design has a central perforated pipe with a charge and a side weakened section covered by a strip. When the fuse is triggered, the charge is initiated. The resulting gases destroy the cross-section of the bomb body and scatter aerial bombs, thereby achieving a large area of scattering of aerial bombs.

KMGU - Unified Container for Small-sized Load. Designed for transportation and release of BKF (container front-line units) with submunitions. During combat use, the KMGU itself is located on the aircraft’s weapons suspension unit and is not dropped (although in an emergency it can be forcibly dropped). Structurally, the KMGU is a streamlined body with controlled flaps, compartments for suspending the BKF and automation that allows you to adjust the block release interval.

==== Cluster bomb submunitions ====
Relatively small caliber bombs are used as submunitions (bomblets) of cluster bombs. Due to the specifics of their use, in addition to the types of bombs described above, there are also specialized bombs, currently used mainly only in cluster bombs and KMGU.

OAB (АО, ShOAB) - an aerial fragmentation bomb (aviation fragmentation bomb, ball fragmentation aerial bomb). Air bombs whose main effect is fragments of the hull. The caliber of the bombs ranges from 0.5 to 50 kg. They are designed to destroy manpower, non- and lightly armored vehicles. Old aerial bombs have a cylindrical body with a rigid stabilizer that provides irregular crushing; modern bombs have a spherical or hemispherical design, a folding stabilizer, aerodynamic devices, notches for organized crushing of the body, or ready-made striking elements.

- Bombs with ready-made fragments are made from two hemispheres reinforced with steel balls. Inside the case there is a bursting charge and a contact fuse.
- Bombs with notches also have a delayed fuse. When meeting an obstacle, such a bomb is divided into two parts and, after the time required to rise several meters, is detonated.

PTAB - an anti-tank aerial bomb. Designed to destroy armored objects. The destructive effect is a jet formed by a shaped charge inside the bomb body. Also, when detonated, the bomb body produces fragments that can hit manpower and unarmored vehicles. For the cumulative jet to be effective, the explosion must occur at a distance called the focal distance. Older bombs have a contact head or bottom fuse. Modern bombs have a built-in fuse with a target sensor.

Cluster bombs
| Abbreviation (Bomb and bomblet) | Image | Warhead type | Diameter (mm) | Length (mm) | Bomb mass (kg) | Number of elements | Mass of one element (kg) | Notes |
|---|---|---|---|---|---|---|---|---|
| РБК-500У ОФАБ-50УД | | high-explosive fragmentation | 450 | 2500 | 520 | 10 | 50 | Universal |
| РБК-500 АО-2,5РТМ | | fragmentation | 450 | 2500 | 504 | 108 | 2,5 | |
| РБК-500 ОАБ-2,5РТМ | | fragmentation | 450 | 2500 | 500 | 126 | 2,5 | |
| РБК-500 БетАБ | | concrete-breaking | 450 | 2500 | 525 | 12 | - | |
| РБК-500У БетАБ-М | | concrete-breaking | 450 | 2495 | 480 | 10 | - | Universal |
| РБК-500 ПТАБ-1М | | anti-tank, shaped charge | 450 | 1954 | 427 | 268 | - | |
| РБК-500У ПТАБ | | anti-tank, shaped charge | 450 | 2500 | 520 | 352 | - | Universal |
| РБК-500У СПБЭ-Д | | self-aiming anti-tank | 450 | 2485 | 500 | 15 | - | Universal |
| РБК-250 ЗАБ-2,5М | | incendiary | 325 | 1492 | 195 | 48 | 2,5 | |
| РБК-500 ЗАБ-2,5СМ | | incendiary | 450 | 1954 | 480 | 297 | 2,5 | |
| РБК-100 ПЛАБ-10К | | anti-submarine | 240 | 1585 | 125 | 6 | 10 | |
